= Kalenjin =

Kalenjin may refer to:

- Kalenjin people of Kenya
  - Elgeyo people (Keiyo people)
  - Kipsigis people
  - Marakwet people
  - Nandi people
  - Pokot people
  - Terik people
  - Tugen people
  - Sebei people
- Kalenjin language
- Kalenjin languages
