= Keiyo language =

Kalenjin language of Kenya

Keiyo
- Elgeyo
- Native to: Kenya
- Region: Rift Valley Province
- Native speakers: 250,000 (2019 census)
- Language family: Nilo-Saharan?: Eastern Sudanic; Nilotic; Southern Nilotic; Kalenjin; Nandi–Markweta; Nandi; Keiyo

Language codes
- ISO 639-3: eyo
- Glottolog: keiy1238

Keiyo (Elgeyo) is a Kalenjin language spoken in western Kenya, in the southern part of the district of Elgeyo-Marakwet.

== The Elgeyo ==
The Elgeyo refer to themselves by the name /kéyaːt/ or /kéyêːk/, or in the singular, /kéyo/ or /kéyaː/. The term /kéyo/ also applies to the language.

== Classification ==
Keiyo is one of the languages spoken by the Kalenjin people, and is part of a sub-group that also includes Nandi, Markweta and Kipsigis. These languages and dialects form, along with Datooga and Omotik, the Southern Nilotic languages sub-group of the Nilotic languages.

== Phonology ==
The tables below present the vowels and consonants of Keiyo.

=== Vowels ===
	Front	Central	Back
Close	i [i] ɪ [ɪ]		ʊ [ʊ] u [u]
Mid	e [e] [ɛ]		ɔ [ɔ] o [o]
Open		a [a] ɑ [ɑ]	

There are, additionally, ten long counterparts of each vowel.

Keiyo differentiates its vowels according to their place of articulation. They are either pronounced with the root of the tongue advanced, or with the root of the tongue retracted. The vowels with the root of the tongue advanced are [i], [e], [o], [a], [u], as well as their long counterparts. The vowels with the root of the tongue contracted are [ɪ], [ɛ], [ɔ], [ɑ], [ʊ], as well as their long counterparts.

=== Consonants ===
	Bilabial	Alveolar	Palatal	Velar
Nasal	m [m]	n [n]	ny [ɲ]	ng [ŋ]
Plosive/Affricate	p [p]	t [t]	c [t͡ʃ]	k [k]
Fricative		s [s]		
Liquid		l [l]		
Rhotic		r [r]		
Semivowel	w [w]		y [j]	

=== Tone ===
Keiyo is a tonal language.
