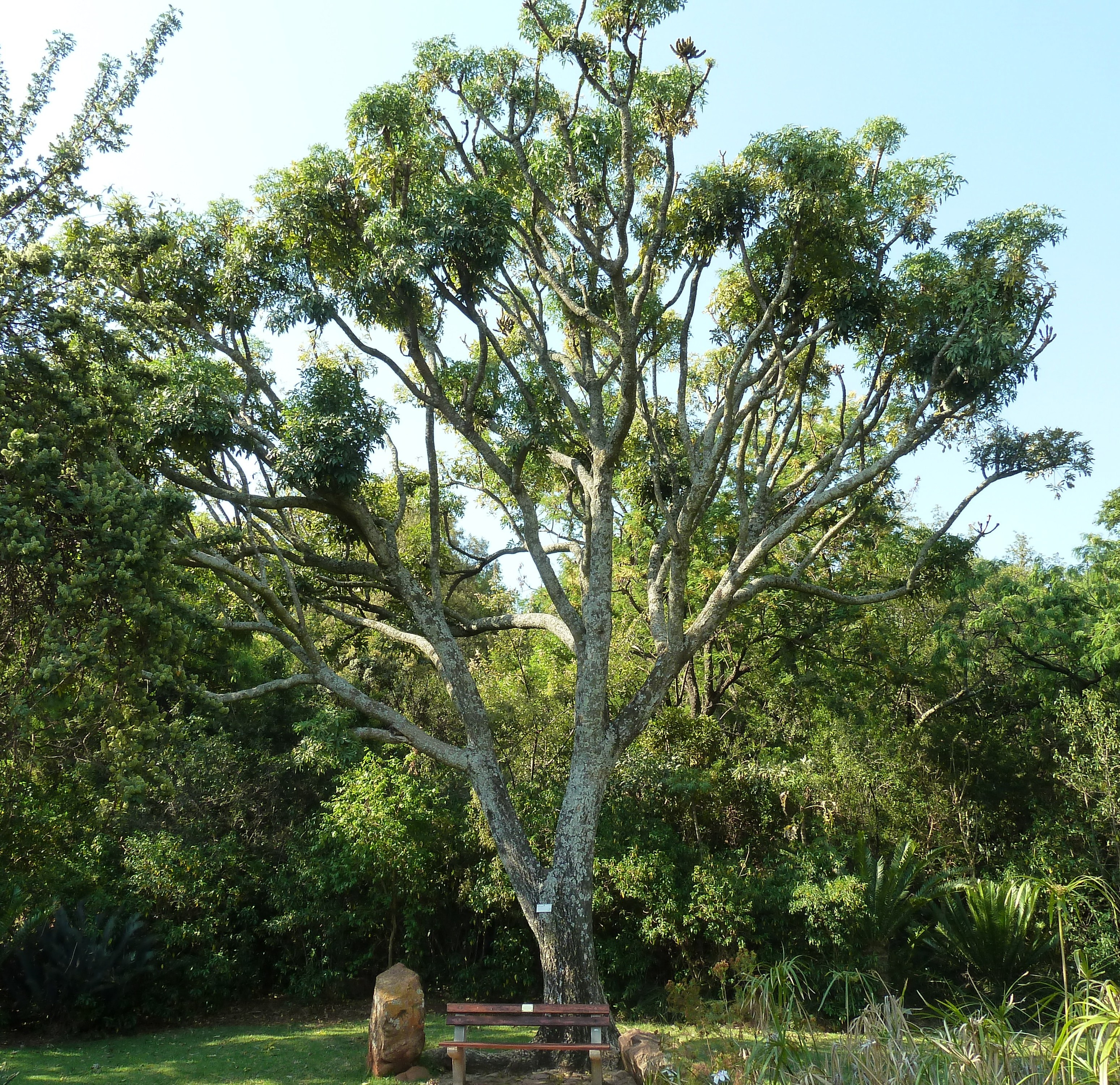
- Cussonia spicata photographed at the Pretoria National Botanical Garden, South Africa

Conservation status
- Least Concern (IUCN 3.1)

Scientific classification
- Kingdom: Plantae
- Clade: Embryophytes
- Clade: Tracheophytes
- Clade: Angiosperms
- Clade: Eudicots
- Clade: Asterids
- Order: Apiales
- Family: Araliaceae
- Genus: Cussonia
- Species: C. spicata

Binomial name
- Cussonia spicata Thunb.

Synonyms
- Cussonia quercifolia Colla; Cussonia triptera Colla; Cussonia boivinii Drake; Cussonia calophylla Miq.; Cussonia kraussii Hochst.

= Cussonia spicata =

Species of tree

Cussonia spicata, commonly known as the spiked cabbage tree or common cabbage tree, is species of tree in the family Araliaceae. Native to East Africa, this species is widely distributed from South Africa in the south to South Sudan in the north.

== Distribution and habitat ==
Cussonia spicata is widely distributed in East Africa, occurring in Botswana, the Democratic Republic of the Congo, Eswatini, Kenya, Malawi, Mozambique, South Africa, South Sudan, Tanzania, Uganda, Zambia, and Zimbabwe, as well as the islands of the Comoros and Mayotte. It grows in both dry and riverine forests, rainforests, wooded grasslands, and savannahs at altitudes of 200–2,550 m (660–8,370 ft) above sea level.

== Description ==
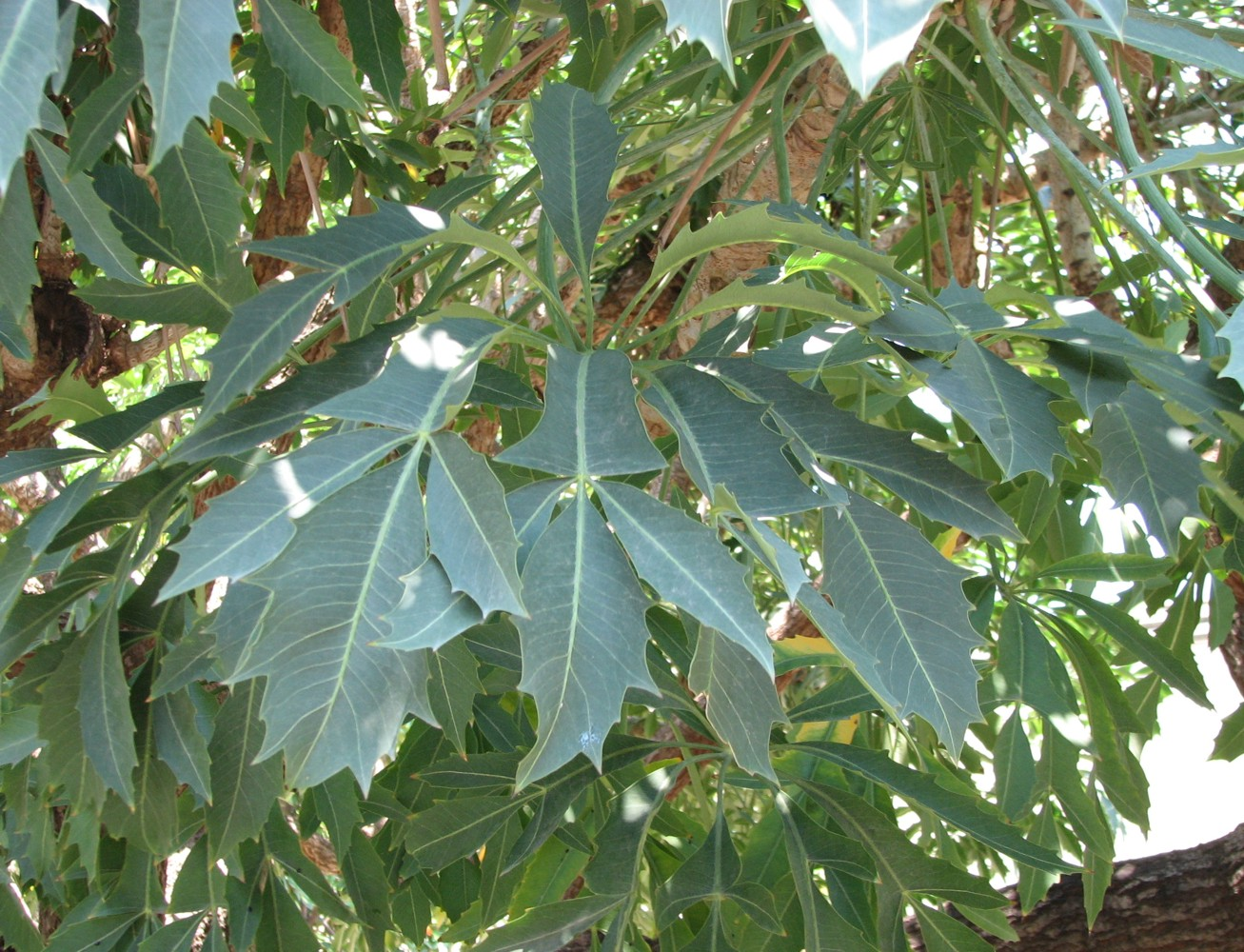
Leaves

Larger specimens develop a sturdy trunk and a rounded, spreading canopy, and can reach a height of 15 meters. The attractive leaves grow from the end of thick branches to form rounded heads. The species name spicata means "spike-like", and suggests the arrangement of its flowers.

== Uses ==
Cussonia spicata is harvested locally for its wood, roots, and leaves to be used as food, medicine, and timber. The wood is light and perishable but is used to construct beehives, wooden bicycle wheels, doors, mole traps, tool handles, and utensils. The succulent roots are edible and have been used as a traditional malaria treatment. The leaves are harvested for fodder and are used in traditional medicine for treating indigestion. It is used both locally and internationally as an ornamental plant.

In English it is commonly known as the cabbage tree, spiky cabbage tree, common cabbage tree, or elephant's toothbrush. Common names in other languages include:

- Afrikaans: kiepersol
- Kikuyu: mwenyiere
- Kipsigis: sokwet
- Maasai: olurur
- Marakwet: jeleikta
- Meru: muengera
- Northern Sotho: motshetshe
- Pokot: cheluptet
- Samburu: borillo
- Shona: mufenje, musheme, or mushondya
- Taita: kidadongo or kidongadi
- Tugen: soya
- Xhosa: umsenge
- Zulu: umsenge
