= Languages of Uganda =

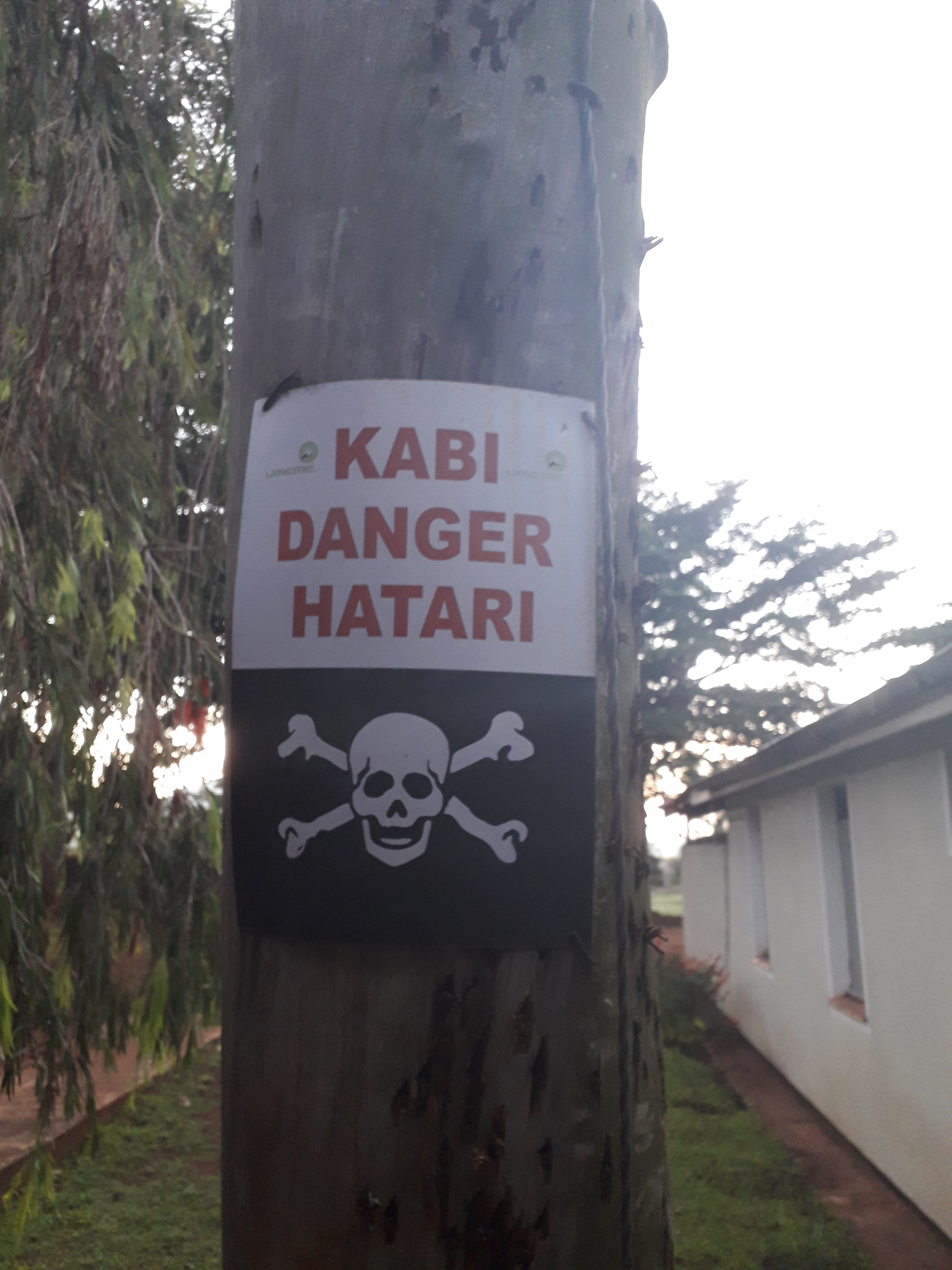
- Warning sign in Luganda, English and Swahili
- Official: English and Swahili
- National: none
- Recognised: Southern Luo, Lugbara, Runyankole, Lusoga, Ateso
- Indigenous: Luganda, Lusoga, Lumasaba, Rutara/Runyakitara languages, Gungu, various Great Lakes Bantu languages (Greater Luyia, Western Lakes Bantu, and West Nyanza languages), various Nilotic languages (Teso-Turkana/Ateker, Luo, and Kalenjin languages), Kuliak languages, various Central Sudanic languages, and Ugandan Sign Language
- Vernacular: Luganda, Ugandan English
- Minority: many Bantu, Nilo-Saharan, Central Sudanic, and Kuliak languages; Nubi
- Foreign: English, Swahili, and Nubi
- Signed: Ugandan Sign Language
- Keyboard layout: QWERTY

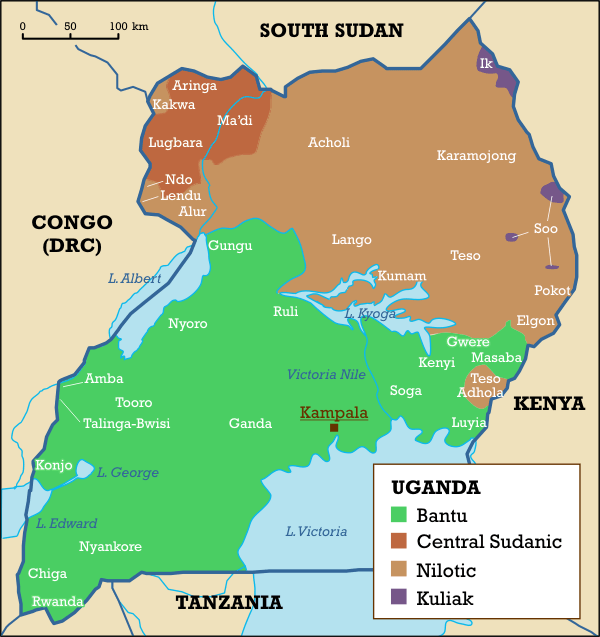
Language families map of Uganda

The most widely spoken language in Uganda, especially in the capital city Kampala, is Luganda, followed by English which has been the country's official language since 1962. English is used as the medium of instruction in schools — a legacy of the colonial period — and it also serves as the primary language for business and legal affairs. Swahili is the third most spoken language after English and Luganda, and became the country's second official language in 2005. Although more prevalent in neighboring Kenya and Tanzania, Swahili is taught in Ugandan schools as an optional subject and is primarily spoken by the military. Swahili is also spoken in some communities near the borders with South Sudan and Kenya.

Uganda is a multilingual country with over 70 estimated languages in active use. Of the 44 living languages documented, 41 are indigenous and 3 are non-indigenous (English, Swahili, and Nubi). The indigenous languages fall into five major language families: Bantu, Nilotic, Central Sudanic, Kuliak, and Ugandan Sign Language. These further subdivide into and include Luganda, Lusoga, Lumasaba, the Rutara/Runyakitara languages, Gungu, various other Great Lakes Bantu languages of the Greater Luyia, Western Lakes Bantu, and West Nyanza branches, the Teso-Turkana/Ateker languages, the Luo languages, the Kalenjin languages, the Kuliak languages, and various Central Sudanic languages and sub-families. Ugandan Sign Language is not known to be phylogenetically related to any other language. English, Swahili, and Nubi are West Germanic, Northeast Coast Bantu, and Arabic-based creole languages, respectively. The status of Uganda's languages varies: 5 are considered institutional, 27 are developing, 7 are established, 2 are endangered, and 2 are nearly extinct. (Note: One language's status is not noted here.)

== Languages ==
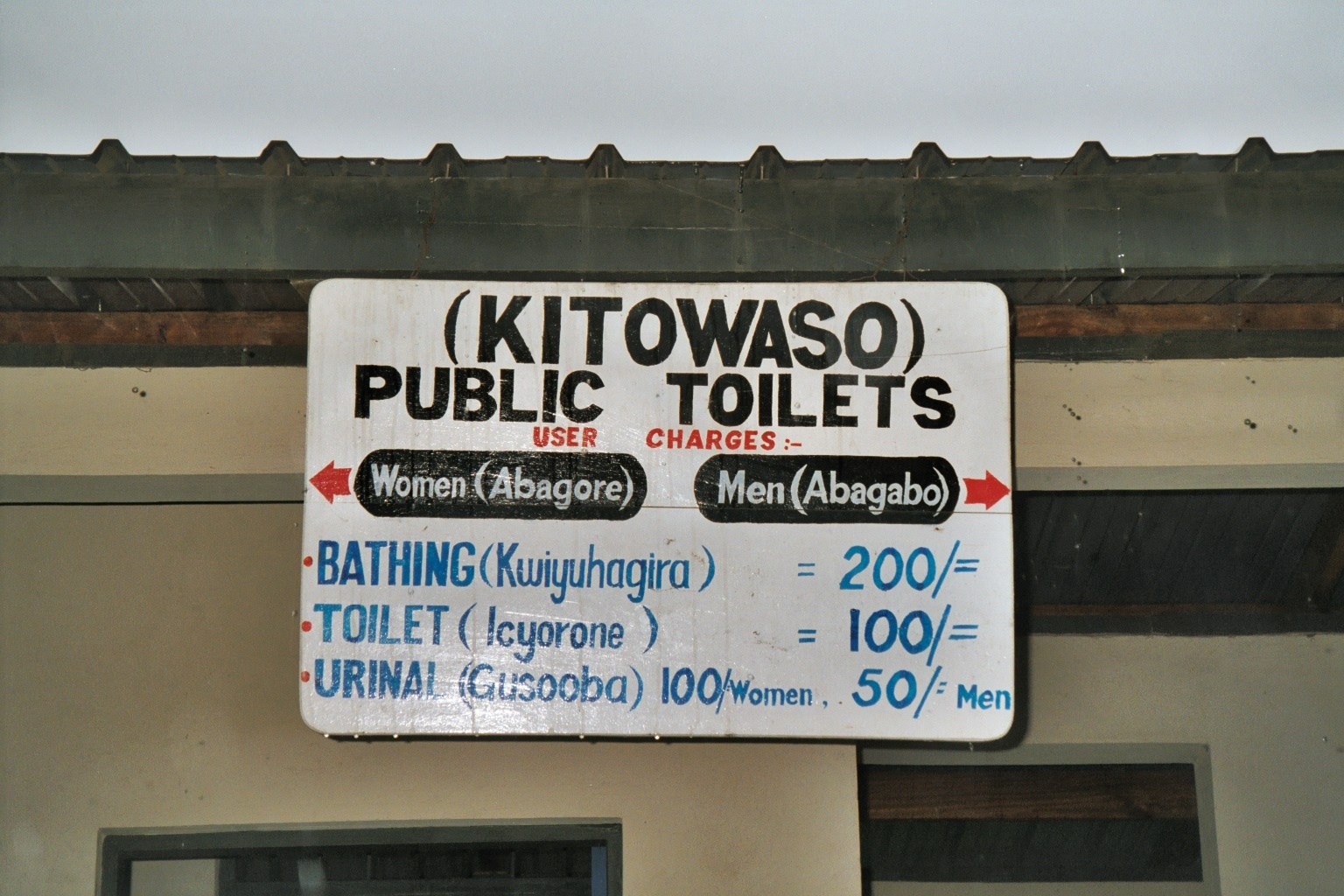
Sign in Kinyarwanda (Rufumbira dialect) and English in Kisoro

In Bantu-speaking regions of Uganda, dialect continua are common. For instance, while speakers in the Mbarara area use Runyankore and those in the Tooro Kingdom speak Rutooro, the communities located between these regions often use dialects that blend features of both. Historically, these and other closely related languages — such as Runyoro, Rutooro, Runyankore, Rukiga, Ruhema, Runyambo, and Ruhaya — were mutually intelligible and shared a common literary tradition under the label Runyoro.

In 1952, distinct orthographies were established for Runyoro–Rutooro and Runyankore–Rukiga, marking a shift toward linguistic differentiation. Around 1990, the term Runyakitara emerged to collectively describe this cluster of mutually intelligible Bantu languages. Runyakitara is not associated with any single ethnic group but rather with the cultural heritage of the historical Empire of Kitara. It has been promoted particularly in academic contexts, such as at Makerere University. However, a fully unified orthography for Runyakitara has yet to be developed and widely adopted.

In south-central Uganda, the Bantu languages of Luganda and Lusoga are largely interintelligible as well. This dialectal similarity also extends to the Lussese language spoken in the Ssese Islands of Lake Victoria.

Some Southern Nilotic Kalenjin languages are spoken along the border with Kenya, including Pökoot and the Elgon languages near Kupsabiny. Kuliak languages Ik and Soo are spoken in northeast Uganda. Lugbara, Aringa, Ma'di and Ndo of northwestern Uganda are members of the Central Sudanic languages.

== Language policy ==
In Uganda, as in many African countries, English was introduced in government and public life by way of missionary work and the educational system. During the first decades of the twentieth century, Swahili gained influence as it was not only used in the army and the police, but was also taught in schools. The Baganda viewed the introduction of Swahili as a threat to their political power and partly through their influence, English remained the only official language at that time.

After independence, there were efforts to choose an African official language, with Swahili and Luganda as the most considered candidates. Although Luganda was the most geographically spread language, people outside Buganda were opposed to having it as a national language. English remained the official language.

Ugandan English, a local dialect of English, is largely influenced by native languages of the Ugandan people but very similar to both the British and American English.

=== Uganda National Kiswahili Council ===
In 2011, the government of Uganda revealed plans to establish a Swahili language council to boost the teaching of the Swahili language in the country. However, it was not until 9 September 2019 that the cabinet passed resolution to create the National Kiswahili Council.

The National Swahili Council is meant to guide the planning process, implementation of interventions and allocation of resources to the usage and development of Kiswahili as a lingua franca – a language that is adopted as a common language between speakers whose first languages are different.
