= Terik language =

Kalenjin language of Kenya

Terik
- Nyang’ori
- Native to: Kenya
- Region: Rift Valley Province
- Ethnicity: Terik people
- Native speakers: 300,000 (2009 census)
- Language family: Nilo-Saharan?: Eastern Sudanic; Nilotic; Southern Nilotic; Kalenjin; Nandi–Markweta; Terik

Language codes
- ISO 639-3: tec
- Glottolog: teri1244

Terik (Nyang’ori) is a Kalenjin language of Kenya.

The language of the Terik is closely related to the Elgon languages Pok and especially Bong'om. Part of the vocabulary is related exclusively to the Elgon languages, for example words like murwaket 'snail', puntet 'nail', and musempet 'sheep tail'. Another trait distinguishing Terik together with Bong'om and Pok from other Kalenjin languages is the replacement of l-V-l by r-V-n in these three dialects. Also, together with the Elgon languages, Terik shows a sound change *l > n which is not shared by other Kalenjin varieties.

The Terik and Nandi languages are mutually intelligible. The ongoing assimilation to Nandi ways of life has led to a decline in the use of the Terik language in favour of Nandi. Among the Terik, migration into Nandiland tends to be viewed as a change in neighbourhood which may require, among other things, that one adapts one's pronunciation to that of the neighbours. "Increasing infiltration of their western Luyia neighbours into Terikland is responsible for the Terik settling in the less densely populated Nandiland to the east. There they are exposed to a different but closely related culture, which they gradually adopt." About 50,000 Terik (less than half of the total population) still speak Terik, but all are middle aged or older. Most children grow up using Nandi. Terik has therefore been classified as an endangered language.
