= Pokot =

Pokot or Pökoot may refer to:

- the Pokot people
- the Pokot language
- Spoor (film), a 2017 Polish film

== See also ==
- West Pokot County, Kenya
