= Sabaot =

Sabaot may refer to:

- Sabaot people, a Kenyan sub-tribe
- Sabaot language, a Kenyan language
