= Languages of Kenya =

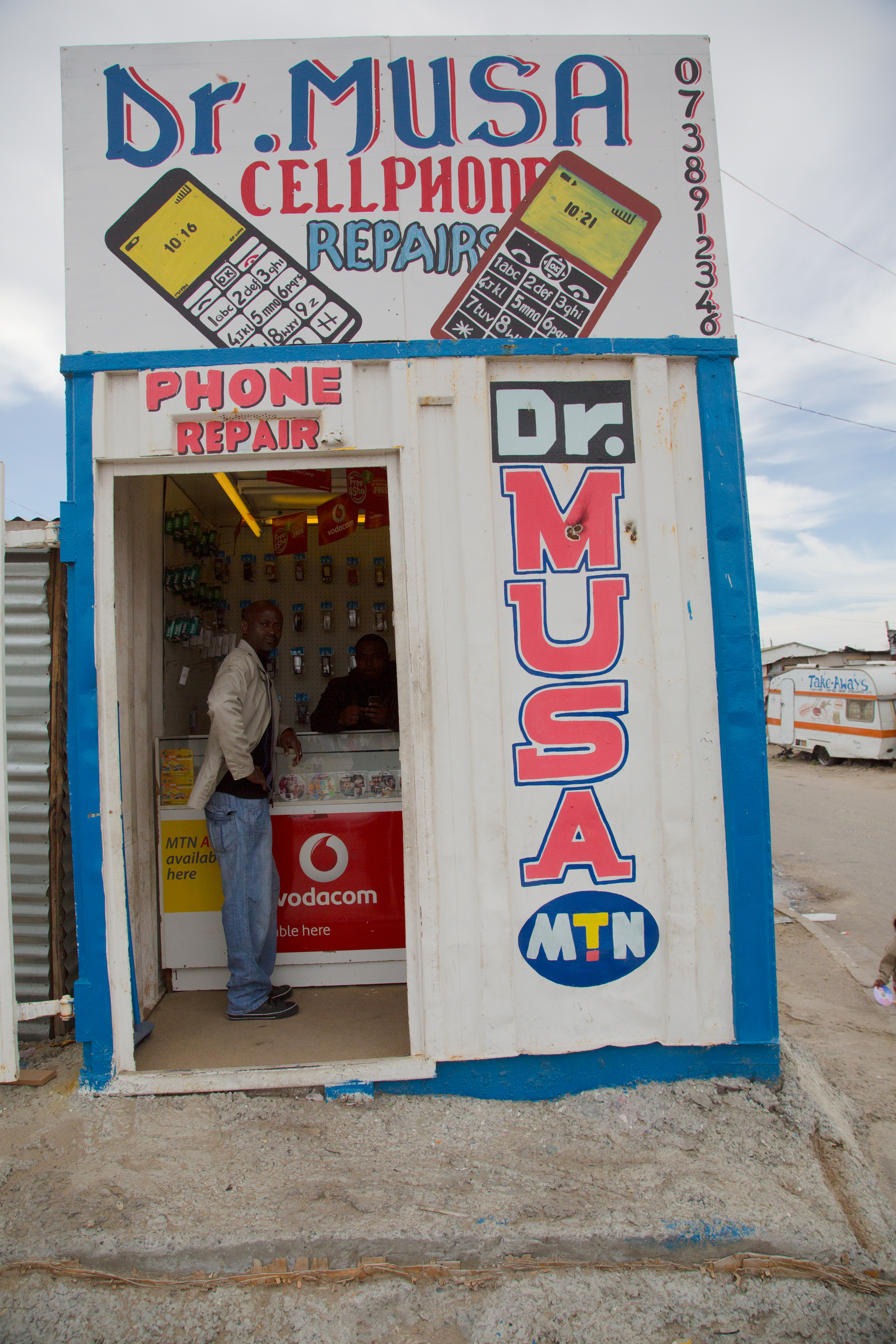
- English shop sign in Nairobi
- Official: English and Swahili
- Main: Swahili (lingua franca)
- Vernacular: Kenyan English
- Signed: Kenyan Sign Language
- Keyboard layout: QWERTY

Kenya is a multilingual country.

The two official languages of Kenya, Swahili and English, are widely spoken as lingua francas; however, including second-language speakers, Swahili is more widely spoken than English. Swahili is a Bantu language native to East Africa and English is inherited from British colonial rule.

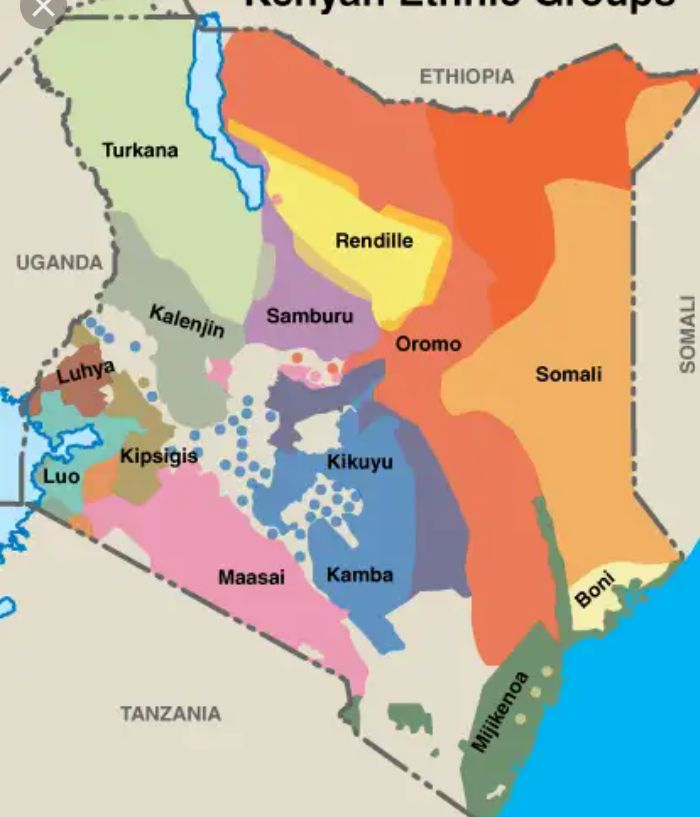
Map of language distribution in Kenya

== Overview ==
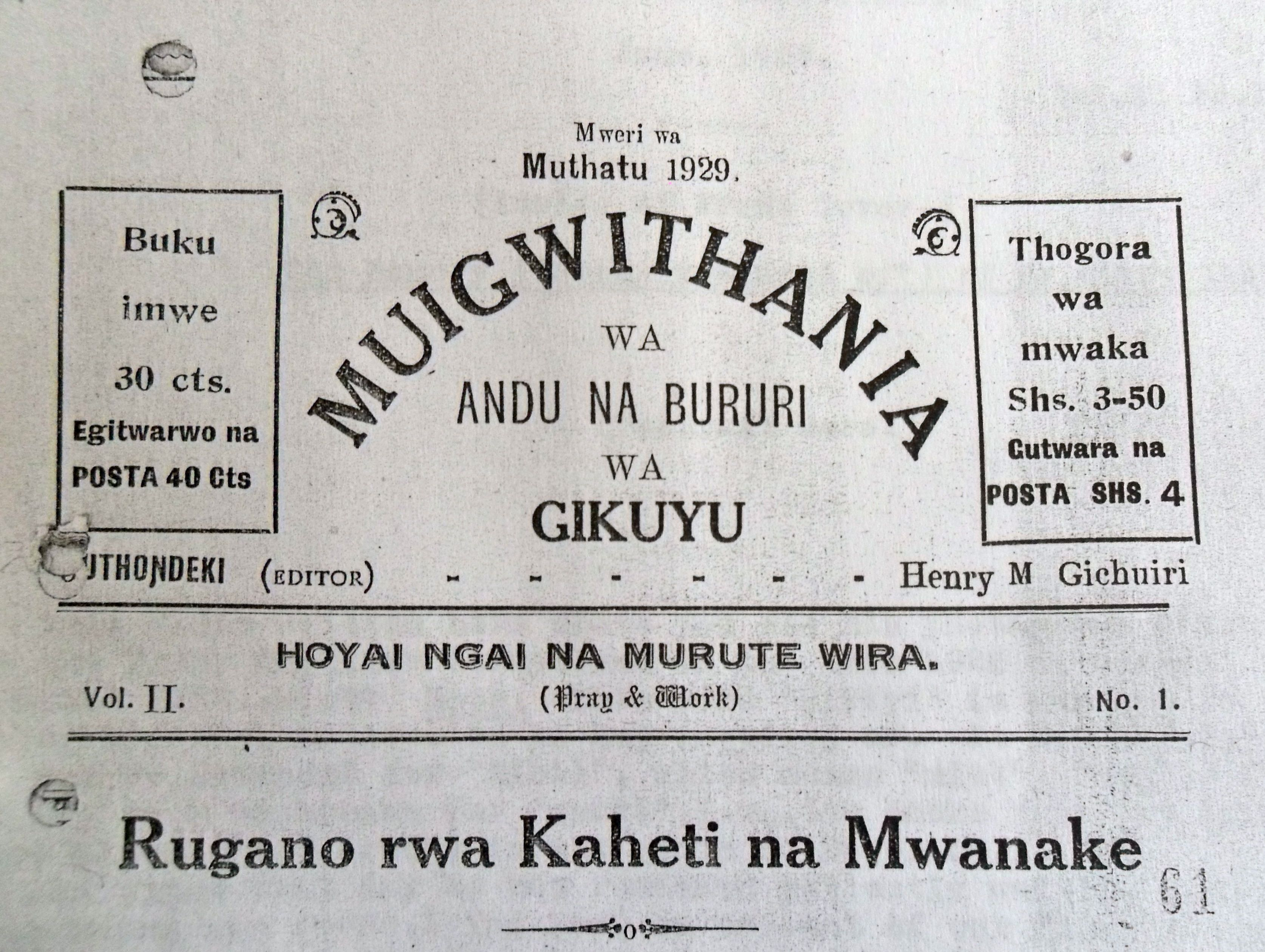
Page from the Kikuyu publication Muigwithania (1929).

According to Ethnologue, there are a total of 68 languages spoken in Kenya. This variety is a reflection of the country's diverse population that includes most major ethnoracial and linguistic groups found in Africa (see Languages of Africa).

Languages spoken locally belong to three broad language families: Niger-Congo (Bantu branch), Nilo-Saharan (Nilotic branch) and Afroasiatic (Cushitic). They are spoken by the country's Bantu, Nilotic and Cushitic populations respectively. The Arab ethnic minority speak languages belonging to the Semitic branch of the latter Afroasiatic family, with the Hindustani and British residents speaking languages from the separate Indo-European family.

Kenya's various ethnic groups typically speak their mother tongues within their own communities. The two official languages, English and Swahili, are used in varying degrees of fluency for communication with other populations. However, Swahili enjoys the status of the national language.

British English is primarily used in Kenya. Additionally, a distinct local dialect, Kenyan English, is used by some communities and individuals in the country, and contains features unique to it that were derived from local Bantu languages such as Kiswahili, Kikuyu and Nilotic languages such as Dholuo. It has been developing since colonisation and also contains certain elements of American English. English is widely spoken in commerce, schooling and government. Peri-urban and rural dwellers are less multilingual, with many in rural areas speaking only their native languages.

== Language families ==
=== Major languages ===
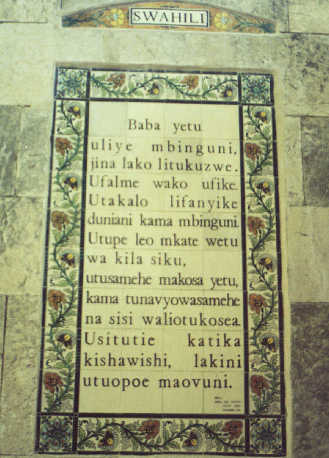
Lord's Prayer in Swahili, a Bantu language that alongside English serves as a lingua franca for many in Kenya.

The 2019 census reports the largest communities of native speakers in Kenya as follows:

- Bantu
  - Kikuyu 8.1 million
  - Kamba 4.7 million
  - Luhya 1.0 million
    - (incl. Bukusu 1.2 million)
  - Gusii 2.7 million
  - Meru 2.0 million
  - Mijikenda/Giriama ca. 1 million
- Nilotic
  - Dholuo 5.0 million
  - Kalenjin languages 4.6 million
    - (Kipsigis 1.9 million, Nandi 940,000)
  - Maasai 1.2 million (1.9 million including Tanzania)
  - Turkana 1.0 million
- Cushitic
  - Oromo (over 48 million incl. Ethiopia)
    - Borana, 276,000 speakers in 2019
    - Orma, 92,000 speakers in 2019
  - Somali 2.8 million (70 million incl. Ethiopia and Somalia)

=== Minor languages ===
Languages spoken by the country's ethnic minorities include:

- Afroasiatic languages
  - Cushitic
    - Rendille, 60,000 speakers in 2015
  - Semitic
    - Arabic
- Indo-European
  - Hindi
  - English
- Bantu
  - Swahili

== See also ==
2019 Kenya Population and Housing Census
