= Pokot people =

African ethnic group

Pokot
Pökoot
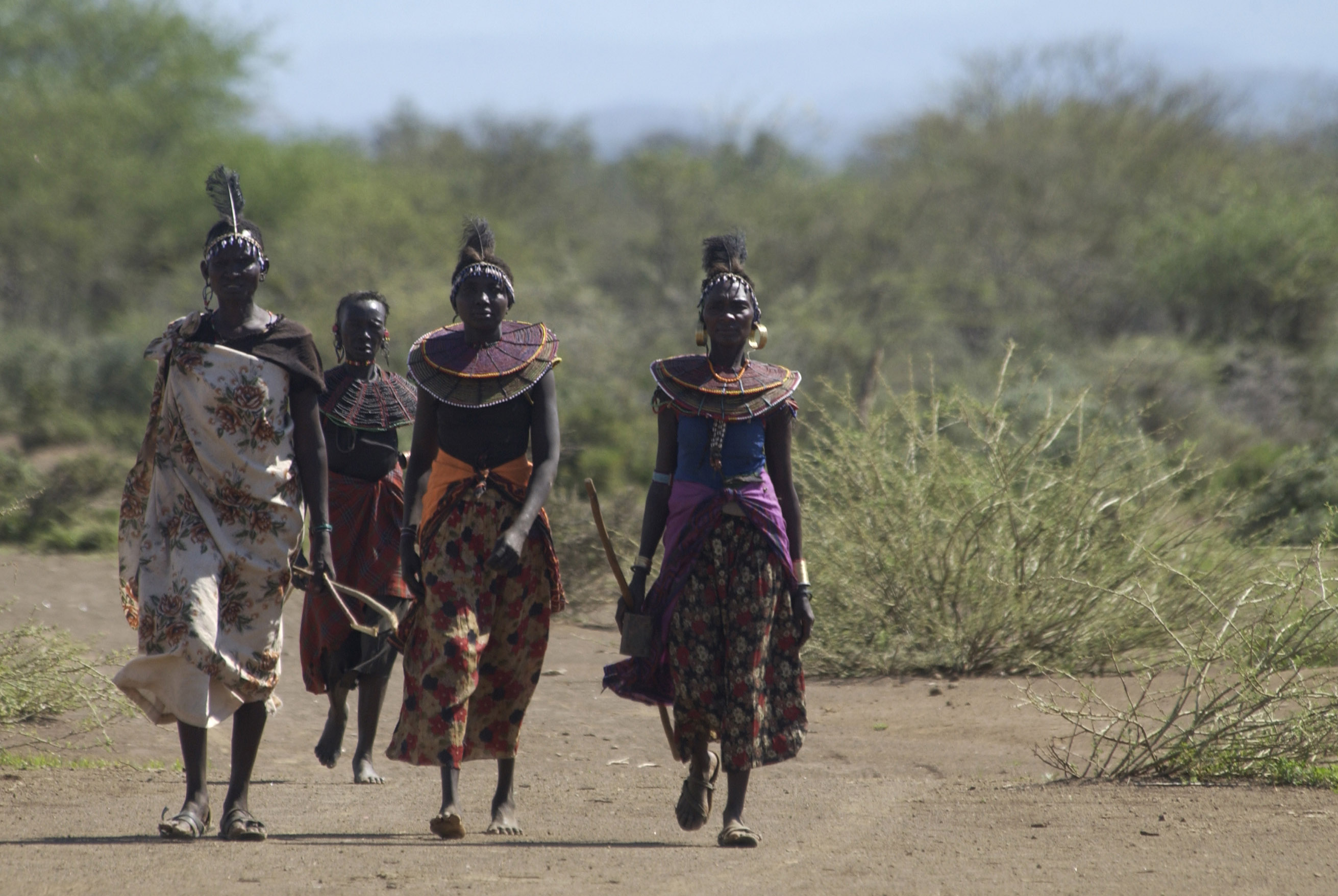
- Pokot women

Total population
- 1,002,000 (2024, est.)

Regions with significant populations
- Kenya: 778,408
- Uganda: 147,000

Languages
- Pökoot (Southern Nilotic; related to Marakwet, Nandi, and Tugen)

Religion
- Majority: Traditional religion (includes worship of supreme deity Tororot, animism, ancestor veneration); Minority: Christianity

Related ethnic groups
- Other Kalenjin peoples (Marakwet, Nandi, Tugen, Kipsigis, Keiyo); Karamojong, Turkana
- Historically called "Suk" during the colonial period, a designation now largely considered pejorative. The Pokot are divided into two main subgroups: the pastoral (lowland) Pokot and the agricultural (highland) Pokot.

The Pokot (also spelled Pökoot) are a Southern Nilotic tribe of the Kalenjin speaking peoples. They primarily inhabit West Pokot and Baringo Counties in Kenya, as well as the Pokot District in the eastern Karamoja region of Uganda. The Pokot speak the Pökoot language, which is broadly similar to the related Marakwet, Nandi, and Tuken. According to the 2019 Kenya Census, their population is 778,408, with an additional estimated population of over 140,000 in Uganda.

== History ==
=== Origins ===
Pokot identity formed in the Kerio Valley perhaps as early as the late 18th and certainly not later than the mid 19th century. It emerged from the assimilation of the Sirkwa era Chok by the Pokotozek section of the Maliri.

=== Assimilation ===
Early 20th century accounts of the Pokot identify two distinct branches of the community with the caveat that much as two ways of life are detailed, they were one people.

Beech (1911) identified significant differences between agricultural and pastoral sections of the Pokot in; oaths, punishment for murder and homicide, punishment for assault, punishment for witchcraft, punishment for theft and robbery, marriage & divorce, recourse in case of unpaid debt and land tenure. He however notes that "it must be therefore borne in mind that, although written of here as two distinct sections, the hill and pastoral Suk are essentially the same".

=== Social organisation ===
Even in the early stages of assimilation, there were no notable differences in matters of social organisation, initiation or governance between the two Pokot groupings. Socially, Pokot men were divided into three groupings; Karachna or boys, Muren or circumcised men and Poi or old men. Boys once circumcised would join an age-set.

=== Inter-tribal relations ===
The Turkana, Samburu and Pokot ethnic groups have organized cattle raids against each other. The two groups have been through numerous periods of war and peace.

== Recent history ==
=== Demographics ===
The number of Pokot speakers in Kenya has been estimated at 783,000 (last Kenyan census carried out in 2009) while the number of Pokot speakers in Uganda is estimated at 130,000.

=== Culture ===
==== Folklore ====
Verbal art is very important among the Pokot. Proverbs are used with versatility both to teach and to make a point. At a gathering of elders, a person may use proverbs to show what a good speaker he is. They are also used to teach younger people the consequences of straying from the moral path. A popular tale, that of the Louwialan clan, is told to warn against pride. Another common tale is that of the blind girl who returns from death . Riddles (Tyangoi) are mostly used as a way of sharpening children's wits and capturing their attention during story-telling time.

The Pokot have various, descriptive terms for different classes of speech that man engages in. These are as follows;

Lökoi: News of other places

Chiran: News of going on's in the neighborhood

Kokwö: Serious conversations of a business-like nature

Kiruok: Conversations of legal nature (from this stems, kiruokot, a legal specialist)

Ng'öliontoköny: Talk of olden times

Even with the introduction of Western education, the Pokot still use folklore as a means of teaching.

==== Customs ====
In November 2014 there was public outrage abroad when pictures of circumcision of young Pokot girls were published in the West, despite Kenya's legal ban on the practice.

== Notable personalities ==
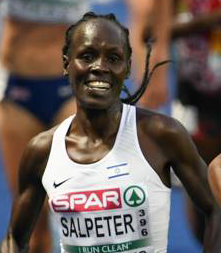
Lonah Chemtai Salpeter

Key personalities of recent times from the community include:

- Kamama Asman Abongutum, politician
- Simon Kachapin, 1st Governor, West Pokot County
- Tegla Loroupe, runner, 2-time NYC Marathon winner
- John Krop Lonyangapuo, 2nd Governor West Pokot County
- Samuel Poghisio, Senator West Pokot County
- Lonah Chemtai Salpeter (born 1988), Kenyan-born Israeli Olympic marathon runner
- Francis Polisi Loile Lotodo (1940-2000), Late MP Kapenguria Constituency in West Pokot: 1988-2000. He died in office in November, 2000 at age 60. A known ardent defender of the Pokoot people (people of the homestead in Kalenjin).
