= KPZ =

KPZ may refer to:

- Kardar–Parisi–Zhang equation, a non-linear stochastic partial differential equation
- Kupsabiny language (ISO 639-3: kpz), a Kalenjin language of eastern Uganda.
- Main Battle Tank (German: Kampfpanzer), a designation given to several German main battle tanks
- Zenica prison (Croatian: Kazneno-popravni zavod), Bosnia and Herzegovina
