= Elgeyo people =

Ethnic group of the Nilotic peoples

Keiyo and marakwets;subtribes Elgeyo
Total population
- 451,602

Regions with significant populations
- Elgeyo Marakwet County and Uasin Gishu

Languages
- Keiyo

Religion
- Christianity & African Traditional Religion

Related ethnic groups
- Kipsigis people, Tugen people, Marakwet people, Pokot people, Nandi people, Sebeii

Keiyo may also refer to Keiyo, a district in Kenya, Keiyo Line, a railway line in Japan, or Elgeyo escarpment.

The Elgeyo (also known as Keiyo) are an ethnic group who are part of the larger Kalenjin ethnic group of Nilotic origin. They live near Eldoret, Kenya, in the highlands of the former Keiyo District, now part of the larger Elgeyo Marakwet County. The Elgeyo originally settled at the foothills of the Elgeyo escarpment, in the area between Kerio river to the east and the escarpment to the west. Due to drought and famine in the valley, the Keiyos climbed the escarpment and started to settle on the highland east of Uasin Gishu plateau. When the British came, the Keiyos were pushed to settle in clusters called reserves.

The Keiyos are avid long-distance marathon runners and have produced elites such as Ezekiel Kemboi, Vivian Cheruiyot. Kelvin Kiptum, the recent world record holder also comes from the tribe.

== Economy ==
The Keiyo subsist mainly on grain, milk, blood, and meat provided by their cattle, sheep, and goats.

== Etymology ==
The names Keiyo and Elgeyo have been used interchangeably. The former name is disputed as a corruption of the latter, which was coined by the Uasin Gishu Maasai, who were the neighbors of the Keiyo in the mid-19th century on the western side of the expansive Uasin Gishu plains.

== History ==
Like the rest of the Kalenjin, the Keiyo originated in an area to the north known as Emetab Burgei, which means the hot country. The people are said to have traveled southwards, passing Mount Elgon or Tulwetab Kony in Kalenjin. The Sebeii settled around the slopes of the mountain while others travelled on in search of better land. The Keiyo and Marakwet settled in the present Uasin Gishu plateau, Kerio Valley, and Cherangani Hills. The arrival of the warring Uasin Gishu Maasai in the present day Uasin Gishu plateau forced the Elgeyo to move away into the present day Kerio Valley during the expansion of the tribe. The loss of much of their grazing lands forced them to reduce their herds and rely more on agriculture.

Due to population growth over time, the Keiyo community gradually moved and settled in urban areas including Eldoret town, where they engage in businesses alongside the Marakwets, Nandis, and other non-Kalenjins.

== Culture ==
=== Language & Linguistics ===
Elgeiyo people speak a Kalenjin/Kutiit language that falls under the Kipsigis - Nandi - Keiyo - Southern Tugen - Cherang'any' cluster.

=== Social groups ===
The Keiyo dialect has four predominant subdialects. These are Irong, Mutei, Marichor and Metkei.

Territorially, the Elgeiyo People divided their land into 21 east-west stretches to control intermarriage and displacement of a clan by other clans and a system of totems was acquired. The land was divided so that each group had access to the banks of Kerio River and thus the totems ran perpendicular to the river. From the south to the north the clans are Metkei, Kapkwoni, Maoi, Tumeiyo, Kowochi, Mwen, Choop, Morop, Samich, Kapsiro, Kenenei Kipking'wo, Sego, Epke, Chang'ach, Rokocho, Mutei, Maam, Irong', Kaptany, and Kapchemutwa and Kiptani. The land was sub-divided to members of the same clan marked by a series of stones referred to as Koiwek.

=== Age-set (Ibinda) ===
The Elgeiyo social organization centers on the age set, or ebendo. There are eight age-sets (ibinwek) which are rotational, meaning after the end of one age set (after approximately 120 years), a new age set begins. Unlike the Nandi and the Tugen, who have only seven age sets (due to loss of an entire age set in battle), the Keiyo retained eight. The order is given below. Ebendo was given out during initiation. The age set system is organized in such a way that a father and a son cannot be of the same or sequential age sets. That is, there must be one ebendo between a father and a son. For example, a Kipkoimet cannot beget a Kaplelach. The Elgeiyo do not consider a woman to have an age set. Hence, she can marry any age set except that in which her father belongs. The age sets are:

- Maina
- Chumo
- Sawe
- Korongoro
- Kipkoimet
- Kaplelach
- Kipnyigei
- Nyongi

A member of an age set for example kipyigei, identifies himself in Keiyo as "A'ii Kipyigei", meaning he is of Kipnyigei age-set. On the other hand, a married woman identifies herself using the age-set of her husband. For example, a woman married to a kipnyigei will identify herself as "Aabo Kipyigeii", meaning she is of a kipyigeei.

== Notable people ==
- Timothy Kiptoo Kochilinyang, Procurement Officer, National Irrigation Authority, NIA Ministry of Water Irrigation and Sanitation, MoWIS, (2015 to Date)
- Gideon Kimaiyo, Current member of parliament, Keiyo South (2022–2032)
- Nicholas Biwott, businessman, politician and philanthropist
- Henry Rotich, former cabinet secretary of the National Treasury, Head of Macroeconomics at National Treasury, deputy director of Economic Affairs.
- Jackson Kiptanui, Chair of KVDA and former MP Keiyo South
- Esther Koimett Director General Public Investment and Portfolio Management at Nation treasury of Kenya.
- Chris Kiptoo Principal Secretary for the Ministry of Environment and Forestry
- Joseph Boinnet, former Inspector General of Police of the Republic of Kenya
- Vivian Cheruiyot 2018 London Marathon winner
- Edna Kiplagat 2017 Boston Marathon winner
- Rhonex Kipruto 2019 10000 m World Bronze medalist
- Paul Chelimo 2020 Olympics 5000 m Bronze Medalist.
- Geoffrey Kamworor Cross country champion.
- Gladys Boss Shollei Uasi ngishu women member of national assembly.
- Daniel Komen 3000 m world record holder.
- Kelvin Kiptum marathon record holder.
- Rtd Lt Gen. John Malan Sawe, was army commander, Chief of General Staff in the army, helped to quash 1982 coup attempt, first Kenyan ambassador to Israel, served as Kenyas high commissioner in Canada,
