= Tugen =

Tugen may refer to:

- the Tugen people
- the Tugen language
- the Tugen Hills
