= Elgon languages =

Languages spoken around Mount Elgon in western Kenya

Elgon
- Sebei
- Geographic distribution: western Kenya, eastern Uganda
- Ethnicity: Sebei people
- Linguistic classification: Nilo-Saharan?: Eastern Sudanic; Nilotic; Southern Nilotic; Kalenjin; Elgon
- Subdivisions: Kupsabiny; Sabaot

Language codes
- Glottolog: elgo1240

The Elgon languages are languages of the Southern Nilotic Kalenjin family spoken in the Mount Elgon area in western Kenya and eastern Uganda. According to the Ethnologue, there are two main Elgon languages: Kupsabiny (spoken by about 120,000 people) and Sabaot dialects (spoken by about 134,000 people). Sabaot is a common name assumed by various related peoples, including the Koony, Sapiiny, Pook, and Bong'om (after whom the Western Kenyan town of Bungoma is named), whose respective languages are considered separate languages by Rottland (1982).

The Terik people, living east of Lake Victoria wedged in between the Nandi, Luo and Luyia, spoke or speak a dialect closely related to Pok and Bong'om. According to their own oral history they are "people of Mount Elgon"; this is confirmed by Bong'om traditions that "the people who later called themselves Terik were still Bong'om when they left Elgon and moved away in a southern direction" (Roeder 1986:142). Recently many of them have assimilated to neighbouring Nandi, leading to a decline in the use of the Terik language in favor of Nandi. Although they live in two countries, both groups speak the same language but with slightly different pronunciations.
