= Kupsabiny language =

Kalenjin language of eastern Uganda

Kupsabiny
- Sabiny
- Native to: Uganda
- Region: Kween District, Kapchorwa District and Bukwo District
- Ethnicity: Sebei
- Native speakers: 270,000 (2014 census)
- Language family: Nilo-Saharan?: Eastern Sudanic; Nilotic; Southern Nilotic; Kalenjin; Elgon; Kupsabiny
- Writing system: Latin script

Language codes
- ISO 639-3: kpz
- Glottolog: kups1238

Kupsabiny (Sabiny), or Sebei, is a Kalenjin language within the Southern Nilotic family, spoken in eastern Uganda.

== Classification ==
Kupsabiny and a dozen other languages form the Southern Nilotic branch of the Nilotic family. The closest relative of Kupsabiny is Sabaot, spoken across the border in Kenya.

== Speakers ==
There are about 360,000 people in the world who currently speak the language, most of them being native speakers. The number of speakers is currently growing and the language is considered developing. Although the language is spoken primarily by Sebei people, it is taught in many primary schools and even beyond to boost communication levels.

== Language ==
The language Kupsabiny of the Sebei people is solely spoken in Uganda. The native speakers of the language are the Sebei people, an ethnic group who live in Uganda. Kupsabiny is a Nilotic language; along with many other languages of the Nilotic peoples. The language is highly tonal. There are 9 vowels and 14 consonants. The language is written with Latin script since 1975 (revised in 2010). Kupsabiny is taught in primary schools and is backed by literacy campaigns to help aid with communication across Uganda.

== Phonology ==
13 consonants are in Sebei (Kupsabiny):

	Labial	Alveolar	Palatal	Velar
Nasal	m	n	ɲ	ŋ
Plosive	p	t	c	k
Fricative		s		
Lateral		l		
Rhotic		ɾ		
Approximant	w		j	

There are a variety of consonant allophones in Sebei (Kupsabiny):

	Labial	Alveolar	Palatal/ Postalveolar	Velar
Nasal	m	n	ɲ	ŋ
Plosive	p, [b]	t, [tʰ, d]	c, [tʃ, tʃʼ, dʒ]	k, [kʰ, ɡ]
Fricative		s, [ʃ, z]		
Lateral		l		
Rhotic		ɾ, [r]		
Approximant	w		j	

Sebei (Kupsabiny) has 6 vowels:

	Front	Central	Back
High	i		u
Mid	e		o
Mid			ɔ
Low		a	

Vowels with short and long vowel allophones listed in brackets are below:

	Front	Central	Back	
High	i		u	
High	[ɪ]		[ʊ]	
Mid	e		[ɤ]	o
Mid	[ɛ]		[ʌ]	ɔ
Low	[æ]			
Low	a	[ä]		

Tone is marked as high, mid, or low.
