= Sabaot language =

Kalenjin language spoken in Kenya and Uganda

Sabaot
- Sebei
- Native to: Kenya/Uganda
- Region: Mount Elgon
- Ethnicity: Sabaot people/Sebei people
- Native speakers: 240,000 (2009 census)
- Language family: Nilo-Saharan?: Eastern Sudanic; Nilotic; Southern Nilotic; Kalenjin; Elgon; Sabaot
- Dialects: Bong’omeek (Bong’om); Koony (Kony); Book (Pok); Sapiiny (Sapiny)

Language codes
- ISO 639-3: spy
- Glottolog: saba1262

Sabaot (Sebei) is a Kalenjin language of Kenya. The Sabaot people live around Mount Elgon in both Kenya and Uganda. The hills of their homeland gradually rise from an elevation of 5,000 to 14,000 feet (1,500 to 4,300 m). The Kenya–Uganda border goes straight through the mountain-top, cutting the Sabaot homeland into two halves.

== Grammar ==
Typical of Nilotic languages, Sabaot uses advanced tongue root (ATR) to express some morphological operations:

ka- a- mnyaan -aa -tɛ -ATR
PAST- 1SG- be.sick -STAT -DIR -IMPERF
'I went being sick (but I am not sick now).'

ka- a- mnyaan -aa -tɛ
PAST- 1SG- be.sick -STAT -DIR
'I became sick while going away (and I'm still sick)'.
