= Ugandan Sign Language =

Deaf sign language of Uganda

- USL
- Native to: Uganda
- Native speakers: 160,000 (2008)
- Language family: local creole?

Language codes
- ISO 639-3: ugn
- Glottolog: ugan1238

Ugandan Sign Language (USL or UgSL) (Note: Early research abbreviated Ugandan Sign Language to USL; more recent research uses the abbreviation UgSL.) is the deaf sign language of Uganda.

== History ==
Uganda School for the Deaf, the first school for deaf children, was founded in 1959. The first generation of students in deaf schools used home signs that evolved to form USL.

In 1973, the Uganda National Association of the Deaf (UNAD) was founded.

In 1994, the first training manual for the language was published, and several dictionaries have been published since then.

Uganda was the second country in the world to recognize sign language in its constitution, in 1995.

Deaf politician Alex Ndeezi was elected to the Parliament of Uganda in 1996. As of July 2026, he is the chairman of UNAD.

== Linguistics ==
USL has influences from American Sign Language, British Sign Language, and Kenyan Sign Language, the first two from the language of instruction in early classrooms, and the latter from deaf Ugandans who went to Kenya for higher education. It is intelligible by users of KSL. Its grammar, pronunciation, and manual alphabet are influenced by English, while certain expressions come from Luganda and Swahili. It is unclear if USL is related to Rwandan Sign Language.

The one-handed alphabet is similar to that of French Sign Language, while a two-handed alphabet based on BSL is less commonly used. Finger-spelling and initialized signs using both alphabets are common among people who learned USL formally as children. Mouthing is also common with abbreviated syllables from both English and Luganda.

Local dialects exist near the country's borders.

== Use ==
There were approximately 160,000 USL users in 2008. Deaf people comprise 0.35% of Uganda's population. (Estimates vary between 160,000 and 840,000 deaf people.) Knowledge of USL is primarily urban, as access to education for the rural deaf remains poor. Nonetheless, USL is a highly valued element of group identity among the deaf community.

As of 2014, there are eleven primary schools and two secondary schools for the deaf in Uganda, as well as about forty units for deaf students in mainstream schools, but these units exist in fewer than 40 of the 100 districts of Uganda. Fewer than 2% of deaf children in Uganda attend school.

Schools for the deaf use a combination of bilingual education and total communication. Education ranges from preschool to university and vocational school, but it is not accessible for all deaf children, and some remain in the general education system.

Although there are at least 44 languages spoken in Uganda, children in deaf schools all learn to write in English and sign in USL. According to linguist Diane Brentari, there is some interference with signed English. About 40% of deaf children learn to write in English.

The Uganda National Association of Sign Language Interpreters (UNASLI) represents USL interpreters. It estimates that there are over 100 interpreters, of which 77 have formal qualifications. It was formed by UNAD at Kyambogo University.

Though the deaf community has a positive attitude toward USL, some hearing people do not. Multiple USL dictionaries have been published, in physical formats and digital formats.
