= Sabaot people =

Sub-tribe in east Africa

Sabaot
Regions with significant populations
- Kenya, Uganda

Languages
- Sabaot language

Religion
- Christianity, Traditional African religions

Related ethnic groups
- Kalenjin people

The Sabaot are one of the tribes of the Kalenjin of Kenya and Uganda. The Sabaot in turn are divided into six sub-tribes largely identified by their dialects. These dialects of the Sabaot language are the Pok, Somek, Mosop, Koony, Bong'omek and Sabiny (Sebei Uganda). Being resident around Mount Elgon, the original homeland of most Kalenjin, the Sabaot are seen as the keepers of the authentic Kalenjin tradition. They and the area they inhabit are often referred to as Kapkugo (meaning grandparents/ancestors place) by other Kalenjin.

== Origins ==
The Sabaot were among the Southern Nilotic-speaking communities, i.e. proto-Kalenjin, who moved into the western highlands and Rift Valley region of Kenya around 700 BC. Their homelands lay somewhere near the common border between Sudan, Uganda, Kenya and Ethiopia. Their arrival in Kenya occurred shortly before the introduction of iron to East Africa. Contemporary studies, supported by a number of historical narratives from the various Kalenjin sub-tribes point to Tulwetab/Tuluop Kony (Mount Elgon) as their original point of settlement in Kenya.

== Settlement ==
=== Oral tradition ===
The traditional account states that most Sabaot once lived at a place called Sengwer which is near the Cherangani Hills. The patriarch of the Sabaot community is said to have been a man called Kingo who moved to Kony from Sengwer. It is said that Kingo had four sons; Chebok, Chepkony, Chesabiny and Chebong’Om. These sons or one of them at least once broke a gourd belonging to their father and Kingo being very mad banished them from their home. The four sons dispersed, some to Bungoma and others to areas further south and west. Wherever each of these sons went, they established a clan and at a later date these clans returned becoming the main clans of the Sabaot community.

== Traditional life ==
=== Initiation ===
Like other Kalenjin and a number of East African societies, the Sabaot traditionally practiced male and female circumcision. Male circumcision was meant to enhance cleanliness and bravery while female circumcision was practiced to reduce promiscuity.

== Economic activities ==
In previous times, the Sabaot had vast lands which allowed for a pastoral lifestyle. With decreasing land size, the Sabaot have been forced to drastically change their lifestyle from cattle herding to planting maize (corn) and vegetables.

== Culture ==
The principal reference points in the Sabaot identity have been land and cattle both of which are coming under increasing threat, from growing land shortages and decreasing pastoralism respectively, which along with a decline in the practice of certain traditional customs such as initiation and polygamy have led to a sense among the Sabaot that their identity is under threat.

== Notable people ==
- Harry Kimtai, a Politician, PS, Health, Kenya Kwanza Government. consultant on Tax Advisory, Bungoma, Kenya.
- Fred Chesebe Kapondi, a Politician, MP.Mt.Elgon constituency,Kenya.
- Hon.Robert Pukose, a Politician, MP.Endebess Constituency, Kenya.
- Hon.Allan Chesang, Senator, Trans-Nzoia County, Kenya
- Hon.Lilian Siyoi, Woman Representative, Trans-Nzoia County, Kenya
- Hon.Philomena Kapkory, Deputy Governor, Trans-Nzoia County, Kenya.
- Hon.Janepher Mbatiany, Deputy Governor, Bungoma County.
- Hon. John Serut(Late), a Politician, former Mp. Mt.Elgon constituency,Kenya.
- Mr. Paul Famba, Chief Executive Officer, public Service Commission, Saboti, Trans-Nzoia.
- Caxton Masudi Ngeywo, Former Commissioner, KRA,World Bank.
- Mark Kapchanga, Deputy Communication Director, State House Kenya, Communication & PR Consultant.
- Daniel Psirmoi, Senior Media Relations Officer, Parliament of Kenya, Communication Consultant.
- H.E. Leonard Boiyo, Kenyan Ambassador to Turkey, Kenya Kwanza Government.
- Moses Masai, Olympian, 10000m bronze medallist
- Hon.Abdi Fadhil Kisos Chemaswet, Politician, MP. Soi County, Uganda
- Linet Masai, Olympian, 2009 World 10000m champion
- Milcah Chemos Cheywa, World Champion 3000m Steeplechase
- Joshua Cheptegei 5000m Olympic champion, 10000m World champion.
- Cellphine Chesipol, athlete, Kitale Kenya.
- Mercy Moim, Volleyball Captain, Kenya National Team, Kapsokwony, Kenya.
- Bishop.Emmanuel Chemengich, ACK, Bishop Diocese of Kitale
- Ben Jipcho, an Olympian, Kinyoro, Trans-Nzoia, Kenya.
- Rev. Dr. Ptallah Butaki, Founder and Executive Director Imani Radio & Tv, Kenya and Uganda
- Davis Kipkania Kiboi, Engineer and Academician from Chepkube, Mt. Elgon
- Prof. George Chemining'wa, Principal, Turkana University College
- Governor Johnson Sakaja, Nairobi
