= Tugen language =

A language of Kenya

Tugen
- North Tugen
- Native to: Kenya
- Region: West Central Kenya
- Native speakers: 140,000 (2009 census)
- Language family: Nilo-Saharan?: Eastern Sudanic; Southern Nilotic; Kalenjin; Nandi–Markweta; Nandi; Tugen

Language codes
- ISO 639-3: tuy
- Glottolog: tuge1241
- Linguasphere: 0-CAA-be (tugen-N.) + 0-CAA-db (tugen-S.)

Tugen is the language spoken by 197,556 Tugen people of the broader Kalenjin group in Kenya. As a part of the Kalenjin dialect cluster, it is most closely related to such varieties as Kipsigis and Nandi.

The Tugen is made up of two main sub-groups, Arror in the north and the Samor in the central parts of Baringo district, Kenya.
