= Naandi language =

Kalenjin language of western Kenya

Nandi
- Naandi
- Native to: Kenya
- Region: Rift Valley Province
- Ethnicity: Nandi people
- Native speakers: 950,000 (2009 census)
- Language family: Nilo-Saharan?: Eastern Sudanic; Nilotic; Southern Nilotic; Kalenjin; Nandi–Markweta; Nandi

Language codes
- ISO 639-3: niq
- Glottolog: nand1266

Nandi (Naandi), also known as Cemual, is a Kalenjin language spoken in the highlands of western Kenya, in the districts of Nandi, Uasin Gishu and Trans-Nzoia.

== Classification ==
Nandi is the language spoken by the Nandi, who are part of the Kalenjin people. These languages and dialects, classified with the Datooga language and the Omotik language, form the Southern Nilotic languages sub-group of the Nilotic languages.

== Phonology ==
The tables below present the vowels and consonants of Nandi.

=== Vowels ===
	Front	Central	Back
Close	i [i] ii [iː]		u [u] uu [uː]
Mid	e [e] ee [eː]		o [o] oo [oː]
Open		a [a] aa [aː]	

Nandi differentiates its vowels according to their place of articulation. They are either pronounced with the root of the tongue advanced, or with the root of the tongue retracted.

=== Consonants ===
	Bilabial	Alveolar	Palatal	Velar
Nasal	m [m]	n [n]	ny [ɲ]	ng [ŋ]
Plosive/Affricate	p [p]	t [t]	tʃ [t͡ʃ]	k [k]
Fricative		s [s]		
Liquid		l [l]		
Rhotic		r [r]		
Semivowel	w [w]		y [j]	

=== Tone ===
Nandi is a tonal language.

== Oral literature ==
In 1909, A.C. Hollis and Charles Eliot published The Nandi: Their Language and Folklore, which contains a selection of folktales, proverbs, and riddles in Nandi with English translations. Here are some of the proverbs:

- "Ii-e ngetuny lel." "The lion bears a hyena (said when a son is unworthy of his father)." (#2)
- "Inga-i ngom, i-ker-i-ke kumut-i?" "However clever you may be, can you see the back of your neck?" (#4)
- "Iok-toi kiplengoi pelio." "Send hares to the elephant (not elephants to the hare; i.e. it is the duty of children to wait on elders, not elders on children)." (#7)
- "Iput-i tany aku pa-kelek angwan." "The ox falls in spite of its four legs (a man often makes a mistake, notwithstanding the fact that he is an intelligent being)." (#)

Here are some of the riddles:

- "Apuk ma-pa. Kina-ap-teta." "It pours out; it does not go. A cow's udder (i.e. it produces liquid and yet cannot let the liquid flow when it wishes)." (#4)
- "A-tinye cheptan-nyo ne-piiy-onyi mutai ko-rukut lakat. Kweyot." "I have a daughter who gets a good meal every morning, but she goes to bed hungry at night. A broom (huts are swept out every morning)." (#7)
- "I-ie tururik annan i-ie che-tililin." "Do you prefer water made dirty (by the feet of oxen) or clean water? I prefer the dirty water (as I should then own cattle)." (#17)

Hollis and Eliot also include a grammar of Nandi.
