= Terik people =

Ethnic group in Kenya

The Terik people are a Kalenjin group inhabiting parts of the Kakamega and Nandi Districts of western Kenya, numbering about 23,324 people. They live wedged in between the Nandi, Luo and Luhya (Luyia) peoples. Among the Luo they are known as nyangóóri, but to the Terik, this is a derogatory term. The Terik call themselves Terikeek; in their usage, 'Terik' refers to their language, land, and culture.

== History ==
According to their own oral history the Terik are "people of Mount Elgon"; this is confirmed by linguistic evidence as well as by Bong'om traditions that "the people who later called themselves Terik were still Bong'om when they left Elgon and moved away in a southern direction" (Roeder 1986:142).

In pre-colonial times, relations between the Terik and the Nandi (their eastern neighbours) were characterized by mutual raids for cattle, land and women, a perspective still alive among old Terik people. However, in recent years the Terik have increasingly come to perceive the Nandi as friendly relatives. A number of factors have contributed to this change in perspective.

Territorial expansion of the Luhya people (the western neighbours of the Terik) has strained Terik-Luhyia relations during the last decades. Luhya are felt to be a threat to the Terik identity and intermarriage has drastically reduced. The expansion of the Luhya (especially the Logoli group) into Terik territory has been a cause of population pressure. This, along with dwindling agricultural potential in the area, has in the second half of the twentieth century motivated many of the Terik to move eastwards, into 'Nandiland' as they call it. Some Terik even claim that they abandoned their homeland because they were afraid of the Luhya.

The Terik have become increasingly oriented at and assimilated to the Nandi. One of the results is a change towards a Nandi-type age set system. The Terik traditionally have twelve age sets, whereas the Nandi have seven. Terik living in Nandiland tend to name a smaller number of age sets than those living in traditional Terik territory. Terik boys also undergo initiation together with Nandi boys. Assimilation to the Nandi has furthermore been accelerated by the growth of a common Kalenjin consciousness, a process which started in the early 1950s.

In recent years, migration into Nandiland has decreased, and the position of the Terik language has been strengthened. Terik schools now teach Terik language.

== Sources ==
- Heine, Bernd (1992) 'Dialect death: the case of Terik', in Brenzinger (ed.) Language Death – Factual and Theoretical Explorations with Special Reference to East Africa. Berlin/New York: Mouton de Gruyter, 255–272.
- Omosule, Monone (1989) 'Kalenjin: the emergence of a corporate name for the 'Nandi-speaking tribes' of East Africa', Genève-Afrique, 27, 1, pp. 73–88.
- Roeder, Hilke (1986) Sprachlicher Wandel und Gruppenbewusstsein bei den Terik. (Sprache und Geschichte in Afrika, Beiheft 7). Hamburg: Helmut Buske.
