= Pökoot language =

Nilotic language spoken in Kenya and Uganda

Pökoot
- Native to: Kenya, Uganda
- Region: West Pokot and Baringo districts in Kenya. Karimojong borderland in Uganda.
- Ethnicity: Pokot people
- Native speakers: 700,000 (2002–2009)
- Language family: Nilo-Saharan?: Eastern Sudanic; Nilotic; Southern Nilotic; Kalenjin; Pökoot

Language codes
- ISO 639-3: pko
- Glottolog: poko1263

Pökoot (also known as Pokot, Päkot, Pökot, and in older literature as Suk) is a language spoken in western Kenya and eastern Uganda by the Pokot people. Pökoot is classified to the northern branch of the Kalenjin languages found in Kenya, Uganda, and Tanzania. The Pökoot are usually called "Kimukon" by the other Kalenjin peoples. A 1994 figure of SIL puts the total number of speakers at 264,000, while the only slightly more recent Schladt (1997:40) gives the more conservative estimate of 150,000 people, presumably based on the figures found in Rottland (1982:26) who puts the number at slightly more than 115,000.

The Pökoot area is bordered to the north by the Eastern Nilotic language Karimojong. Turkana, another Eastern Nilotic language, is found to the northeast. To the east, the Maa languages Samburu and Camus (on Lake Baringo) are spoken, and to the south, the other Kalenjin languages Tugen and Markweta are found, which show considerable influence from Pökoot.
