= Omotik language =

Nilotic language of Kenya

Omotik
- Laamoot
- Native to: Kenya
- Region: Great Rift Valley
- Ethnicity: 200 Omotiks (2020)
- Native speakers: (50 older adults cited 1980)
- Language family: Nilo-Saharan?: Eastern Sudanic; Southern Eastern; Nilotic; Southern; Omotik–Datooga; Omotik

Language codes
- ISO 639-3: omt
- Glottolog: omot1239
- ELP: Omotik

Omotik (Sawas) is a moribund Nilotic language of Kenya. It is spoken by the hunter-gatherer Omotik people of the Great Rift Valley among the Maasai; most of the Omotik population has shifted to the Maasai language.
