= Markwet language =

Kalenjin language spoken in Kenya

Markwet
- Native to: Kenya
- Ethnicity: Marakwet
- Native speakers: 180,000 (2009 census)
- Language family: Nilo-Saharan?: Eastern Sudanic; Nilotic; Southern Nilotic; Kalenjin; Nandi–Markweta; Markwet
- Dialects: Endo (Northern); Sambirir (Southern)

Language codes
- ISO 639-3: enb
- Glottolog: mark1255

Markwet (Markweeta) is a Kalenjin language of Kenya. The regional terms Endo and Sambirir (or the clan name Talai) have been used for northern and southern Markweta, but they are not distinct dialects. The unmarked word order is Verb–subject–object.

== Phonology ==
=== Vowels ===
Markweta has five basic vowels: /a, e, i, o, u/. All vowels have variants based on tongue root position and length, for a total of 20 distinct vowel phonemes.

The vowels /o:/ and /a:/ are both pronounced like /ɔ:/, and can only be distinguished by looking at affixes.

=== Consonants ===
Markweta has 13 consonants:

	Bilabial	Alveolar	Palatal	Velar
Nasal	m	n	ɲ	ŋ
Plosive	p	t	c	k
Fricative		s		
Approximant		l	j	w
Trill		r		

== Morphology ==
Markweta has gender. Gender is realized as a prefix added primarily for person nouns and animal names, but sometimes inanimate objects.

The prefixes kaa- and kii- are used to indicate nominalization.

== Bible ==
On 1 August 2026, at the Tot Primary School in Elgeyo Marakwet County, the complete Bible in the Markweta language is due to be released. The New Testament was released in February 2009, and the Jesus Film in 2012.
