= Kipsigis language =

Kenyan language

Kipsigis
- Native to: Kenya
- Ethnicity: Kipsigis
- Native speakers: 1.9 million (2009 census)
- Language family: Nilo-Saharan?: Eastern Sudanic; Nilotic; Southern Nilotic; Kalenjin; Nandi–Markweta; Kipsigis

Language codes
- ISO 639-3: sgc
- Glottolog: kips1239

Kipsigis (or Kipsikii, Kipsikiis) is a variety of the Kenyan Kalenjin dialect cluster. It is spoken mainly in Kericho and Bomet counties in Kenya. The Kipsigis people are the most numerous tribe of the Kalenjin in Kenya, accounting for 60% of all Kalenjin speakers. Kipsigis is closely related to Nandi, Keiyo (Keyo, Elgeyo), South Tugen (Tuken), and Cherangany.

The Kipsigis territory is bordered to the south and southeast by the Maasai. To the west, Gusii (a Bantu language) is spoken. To the north-east, other Kalenjin people are found, mainly the Nandi. East from the Kipsigis, in the Mau forests, live some Okiek speaking tribes.

== Phonology ==
=== Consonants ===
| | Labial | Alveolar | Palatal | Velar |
|---|---|---|---|---|
| Nasal | m | n | ɲ | ŋ |
| Stop | p | t | (c) | k |
| Affricate | | | tʃ | |
| Fricative | | s | | |
| Rhotic | | r | | |
| Lateral | | l | | |
| Approximant | | | j | w |

- /r/ can be heard as either a trill [r] or a tap [ɾ].
- /tʃ/ may also be realized as a palatal stop [c].
- /k/ may also have a voiced allophone [ɡ], as well as become spirantized as a voiced fricative [ɣ].

=== Vowels ===
| | +ATR | | -ATR | |
| | Front | Back | Front | Back |
|---|---|---|---|---|
| Close | i iː | u uː | i̙ i̙ː | u̙ u̙ː |
| Mid | e eː | o oː | e̙ e̙ː | o̙ o̙ː |
| Open | a aː | | a̙ a̙ː | |

=== Double vowels ===
Usually, the pronunciation of a double vowel does not mean a repetition of that vowel sound but rather an elongation of that particular vowel sound. An exception to that generalization shows up with the double ee.

Normally, the elongated vowel sounds follow the Latin vowel sounds. A few examples are given in the table below

| Vowel | As Kipsigis | As in English |
|---|---|---|
| aa | Kaap | mama, mark, margin, sharp |
| ii | Asiis | piece, peace, freeze, sneeze |
| oo | igoondiit roopta | gone robe |
| uu | piyuut | root, boot |

The sound of the double ee may vary in pronunciation. For example:

| As in Kipsigis | As in English |
|---|---|
| akweet 'flock' | wet |
| beek 'water' | bake |
| meet 'death' | for this word, there are two sounds, as in lay-ette |

== Notes ==
1. See Kalenjin languages and Nandi–Markweta languages for a clarification of the Nandi/Kalenjin nomenclature.
