= Southern Nilotic languages =

Subgroup of the Nilotic language family

Southern Nilotic
- Geographic distribution: western Kenya, eastern Uganda, northern Tanzania
- Linguistic classification: Nilo-Saharan?: Eastern Sudanic; Southern Eastern; Nilotic; Southern Nilotic
- Subdivisions: Kalenjin; Omotik–Datooga

Language codes
- Glottolog: sout2830

The Southern Nilotic languages are spoken mainly in western Kenya and northern Tanzania (with one of them, Kupsabiny or Sapiny, being spoken on the Ugandan side of Mount Elgon). They form a division of the larger Nilotic language family, along with the Western Nilotic languages and the Eastern Nilotic languages.

== Subdivisions ==
The Southern Nilotic languages are generally divided into two groups, Kalenjin and Tatogoa, although there is some uncertainty as to the internal coherence of the Kalenjin branch. Southern Nilotic languages appear to have been influenced considerably by Cushitic (Afro-Asiatic) languages. The Kalenjin languages are spoken by the Kalenjin people. This family spreads all around Uganda and to some of Kenya. The Tatoga languages consist of the Omotik language and of the larger Datooga language, or more fitting, Datooga dialect cluster.

- Kalenjin (see)
- Tatoga: Omotik, Datooga

== Languages ==
- Kalenjin
  - Elgon languages
    - Kupsabiny
    - Sabaot
  - Nandi–Markweta
  - Kipsigis
  - Okiek
  - Pökoot
- Tatogoa
  - Datooga
  - Omotik

== Reconstruction ==
Proto-Kalenjin has been reconstructed by Franz Rottland (1979).

== Cushitic influences ==
Historically, Southern Nilotic has undergone extensive contact with a "missing" branch of East Cushitic that Heine (1979) refers to as Baz. Proto-Baz reconstructions proposed by Heine (1979), with notes about corresponding East Cushitic and Proto-East Cushitic forms from Sasse (1979):

Gloss	Proto-Baz	Proto-East Cushitic	Example cognates
bat	*rɛɛrɛɛʕ		
bell	*kor		
bovine, male	*aʀ	*ʔawr- 'large male animal'	Saho and Somali awr, Oromo ooroo
calf	*maʀ		
cow dung, mud	*zig		
curse (n.)	*hab-	*hab-aar- 'to curse'	Saho and Oromo abaar, Somali habaar
eat, to	*am		
eight	*siziet		
ewe, virgin	*subeen		
feathers, fur	*goro-		
fifty	*konom	*ken- 'five'	Konso ken, Oromo shani, Somali shan
fingernail, claw	*ʕidd		
forty	*afaram	*ʔafar- 'four'	Afar affara, Somali afar, Oromo afur
goat, male	*quar-		
goat/sheep, young	*maqal		
grass	*ʕaus	*ʕawš- ~ *ʕayš-	Afar qayso, Somali caws, Oromo ees
head	*mɛtɛħ	*matħ-	Arbore mete, Somali madax, Oromo mataa
honey	*malab	*malab-	Afar–Saho and Somali malab
hundred	*boqol	*bokʼl-	Saho bool, Somali boqol
lake, sea	*baz	*baz-	Afar–Saho and Somali bad, Daasanach baz
look, to	*ilaal	*ʔil-aal-, derivative from *ʔil- 'eye'	Saho and Oromo ilaal
lost, to get	*bod	*bad-	Afar–Saho, Somali and Oromo bad-
louse	*insir		
lover	*saani		
nine	*sagaal		Afar and Somali sagaal, Oromo sagal
pot, clay	*ɖeri		
rain	*roob	*roob-	Oromo rooba, Somali roob
red	*buri-		
scratch, to	*quut		
see, to	*kas		
seven	*tizzaba		Arbore tuzba
six	*lVħ	*liħ	Daasanach li, Oromo jaha, Somali lix
smoke	*iʀi		
spear	*tor		
suck, to	*nug	*nuug-	Oromo luug, Rendille nug, Somali nuug
ten	*tamman	*tomman	Arbore tomon, Saho tamman, Somali toban
thirty	*sozzom	*sezħ- 'three'	Arbore sezze, Oromo sadii, Somali saddex

== See also ==
- Languages of Kenya
- Languages of Tanzania
- Languages of Uganda
- Serengeti-Dorobo language, of which at least the numeral system is Southern or Eastern Nilotic
- List of Proto-Southern Nilotic reconstructions (Wiktionary)
