= Sebei people =

Nilotic ethnic group in eastern Uganda

Sebei
Total population
- 377,030

Regions with significant populations
- Uganda

Languages
- Sebei, English

Religion
- Christianity, Traditional African religions, Islam

Related ethnic groups
- Kalenjin people, other Nilotic people

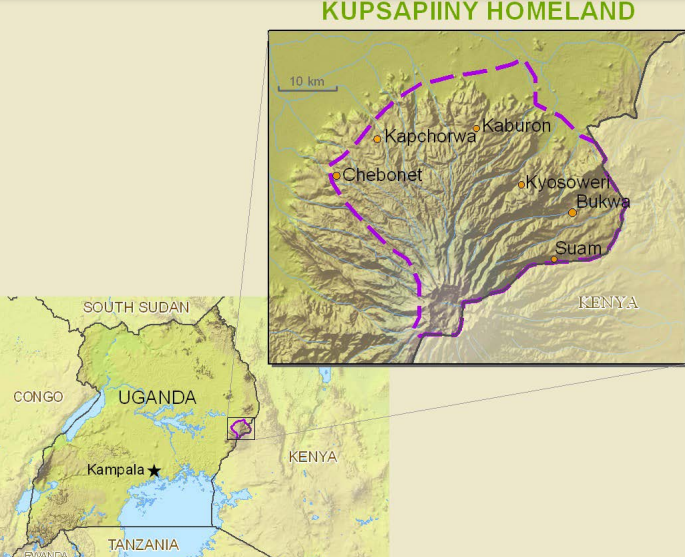
Location of the Sebei People in Mt. Elgon.

The Sebei are a Nilotic ethnic group inhabiting eastern Uganda. They speak Kupsabiny. The Sapiiny live in the districts of Bukwo, Kween and Kapchorwa.

== Religion ==
The majority of Sabiny are Christians. According to the 2002 Census of Uganda, 40.5% of Sabiny are Anglican (Church of Uganda), 23.4% are Roman Catholic, 18.3% are Pentecostal, 9.7% are Muslim and 7% follow other religions.

== Culture ==
The Sebei people lead a fairly simple life style. The main structures of their lives are centered around cattle keeping, growing crops, and making beer. Common jobs held by the Sebei include cattle rearing and farming. The jobs depend on where you live. Because of their fairly laid back culture, the need for major social structure is limited. Sebei people are relatively peaceful, there are limited criminal offenses that one could do. In Sebei culture, there are two levels of criminal offense. The highest level is for murder and physical assault, the lower level is for property or major civil disputes between people or groups of people. The Sebei people also circumcise teenage boys and girls as a right of passage to adulthood.

== Language ==
The Sebei commonly known as Sabiny speak a language called Kupsabiny. This is linked to the Kalenjin dialect spoken by smaller groups that have settled on the slopes of Mount Elgon.

== Locations ==
The Sebei's live primarily on the slopes of Mount Elgon in eastern Uganda. They number about 300,000 people and occupy an area of 1,730.9 square km in the districts of Bukwo, Kapchorwa and Kween. Their territory borders the Republic of Kenya which is a home to more than six million Kalenjin, a large ethnic group to which the Sebei belong. The Sebei's now known mainly as Sapiny, speak Kupsabiny, a Kalenjin language spoken by other smaller groups of Kalenjin stock around Mount Elgon. The Sebei and Kenyan smaller groups (Book, Kony, Mosoop, Someek, Bongomek) inhabiting the hills of Mount Elgon are collectively referred to as the 'Sabaots.

=== In Uganda ===
The majority of the Sebei people live in the country of Uganda. The percent of the Ugandan population that is Sebei is only 0.6%; meaning that there are about 300,000 Sebei in Uganda.

== Notable Sebei ==
Athletics

- Joshua Cheptegei 2022 10000m World Champion.
- Jacob Kiplimo 2022 10000m bronze medalist.
- Oscar Chelimo 2022 5000m World Bronze medalist.
- Peruth Chemutai 2020 Olympics Gold Medalist in the 3000m steeplechase women.
- Stephen Kiprotich 2012 Summer Olympics Marathon Gold Medalist.
- Moses Ndiema Kipsiro 2007 World Athletics 5000m bronze medalist.
- Stella Chesang 2018 Commonwealth gold medalist in the 1000m.
- Boniface Toroitich Kiprop 2006 Commonwealth gold medalist in the 10,000m.
- Martin Toroitich Ugandan long-distance runner, young brother to Boniface Toroitich Kiprop.
- Victor Kiplangat 2022 Commonwealth gold medalist in the men's marathon.
- Benjamin Kiplagat Ugandan long-distance runner.
- Juliet Chekwel Ugandan long-distance runner.
- Esther Chebet Ugandan long-distance runner.
- Rachael Zena Chebet Ugandan long-distance runner.
- Mercyline Chelangat Ugandan long-distance runner.
- Sarah Chelangat Ugandan long-distance runner.
- Albert Chemutai Ugandan long-distance runner.
- Immaculate Chemutai Ugandan long-distance runner.
- Felix Chemonges Ugandan long-distance runner.

Academics and Admistation

- Professor Sheme Chemangey Masaba,(phd) the first Sebei to become a government minister).
- Professor Alex Chemutai(phd).
- Ambassador Stephen Chebrot.
- Yovani Chemonges, politician.
- Aloni Muzungyo, Administrator.
- David Arapta, Civil Servant.
- William Cheborion, Civil Servant.

== See also ==
- Unreached people
- Demographics of Uganda
