= Mount Elgon =

Volcano in Kenya and Uganda

Mountain Elgon
- Wagagai (summit)
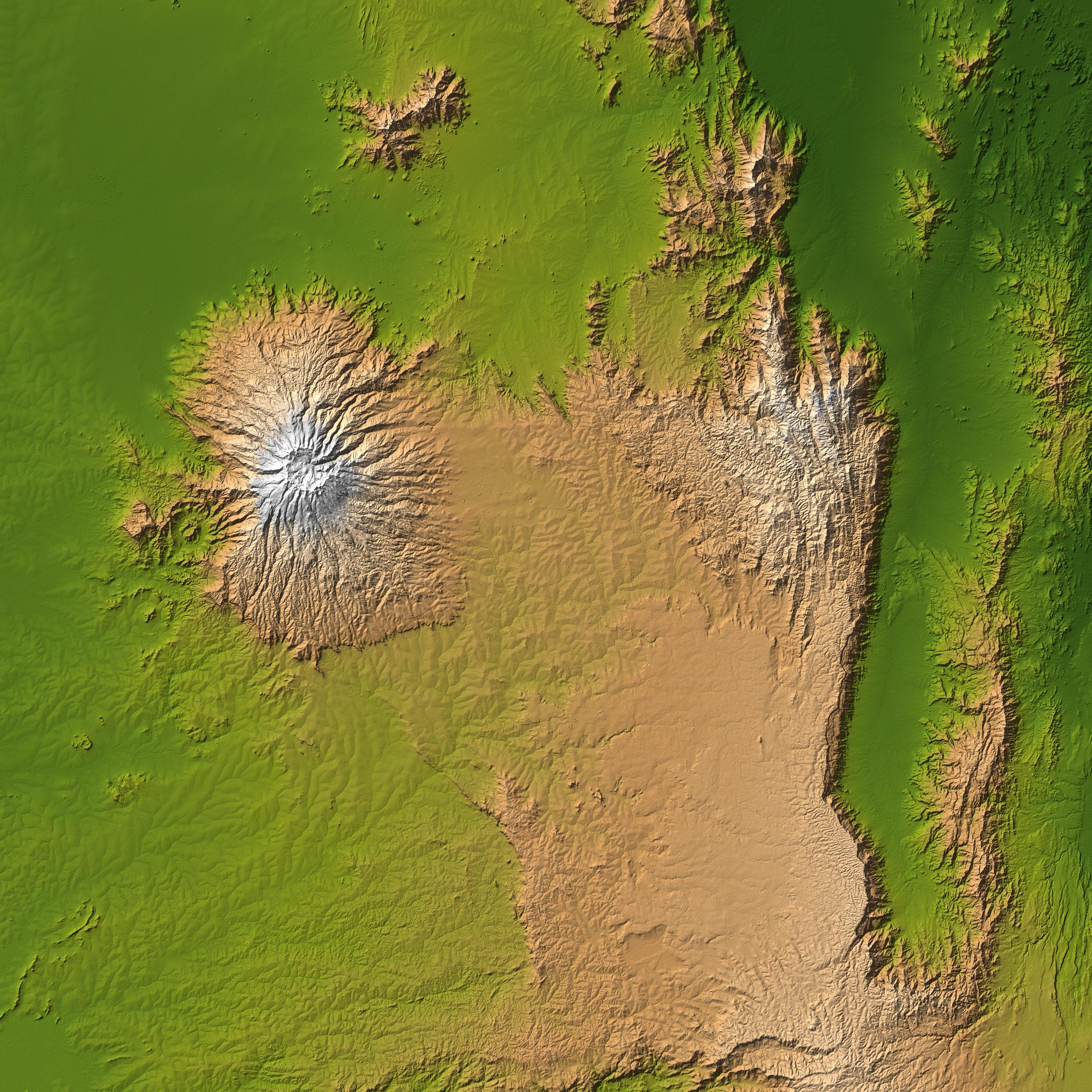
- Mount Elgon (left) and Great Rift Valley (right)

Highest point
- Elevation: 4,321 m (14,177 ft)
- Prominence: 2,457 m (8,061 ft)
- Isolation: 339 km (211 mi)
- Listing: Mountains of Africa 16th Ultra
- Coordinates: 1°08′16″N 34°33′37″E

Geography
- Location within Kenya Location within Uganda Location within Africa
- Location: Uganda
- Topo map(s): Mount Elgon Map and Guide

Geology
- Formed by: Volcanism along the Gregory Rift
- Rock age: Miocene origin
- Mountain type: Shield volcano
- Last eruption: Unknown

Climbing
- First ascent: 1911 by Kmunke and Stigler
- Easiest route: Scramble

Mount Elgon is an extinct shield volcano on the border of Uganda and Kenya, north of Kisumu, east of Mbale and west of Kitale. The mountain's highest point, named "Wagagai", is located entirely within Uganda. Although there is no verifiable evidence of its earliest volcanic activity, geologists estimate that Mount Elgon is at least 24 million years old, making it the oldest known extinct volcano in East Africa. The mountain's name originates from its Maasai name, “Ol Doinyo Ilgoon” (Breast Mountain). The mountain is also known as Masaaba by the local bantu population.

== Physical features ==
Mount Elgon is a massive solitary volcanic mountain on the border of eastern Uganda and western Kenya. Its vast form, 80 kilometres (50 mi) in diameter, rises 3,070 metres (10,070 ft) above the surrounding plains. Its cooler heights offer respite for humans from the hot plains below, and its higher altitudes provide a refuge for flora and fauna.

Mt. Elgon consists of five major peaks:

- Wagagai (4,321 metres (14,177 ft)), in Uganda
- Sudek (4,302 metres (14,114 ft)) on the Kenya/Uganda border
- Koitobos (4,222 metres (13,852 ft)), a flat-topped basalt column in Kenya
- Mubiyi (4,211 metres (13,816 ft)) in Uganda
- Masaba (4,161 metres (13,652 ft)) in Uganda

Other features of note are:

- The Caldera — Elgon's is one of the largest intact calderas in the world.
- Subsidiary craters to the Southwest: All about 25 km across, Bududa, and Manafwa rings intersect the caldera and Bububo with a central plug sits at its edge. The smaller Tororo marks the plain almost 50 km from Elgon’s peak.
- The warm springs by the Suam River
- Endebess Bluff (2,563 metres (8,409 ft))
- Ngwarisha, Makingeny, Chepnyalil, and Kitum caves: Kitum Cave is over 60 metres (200 ft) wide and penetrates 200 metres (660 ft) into the mountain. The cave contains salt deposits and it is frequented by wild elephants that lick the salt exposed by gouging the walls with their tusks. Richard Preston's book The Hot Zone (1994) described the cave's association with the Marburg virus after two people who had visited it (one in 1980 and another in 1987) contracted the disease and died.

The mountain soil is red laterite. The mountain is the catchment area for several rivers such as the Suam River, which becomes the Turkwel downstream and drains into Lake Turkana, and the Nzoia River and the Lwakhakha River, which flow to Lake Victoria. The towns of Mbale, Uganda and Kitale, Kenya are in the foothills of the mountain. The area around the mountain is protected by two Mount Elgon National Parks, one on each side of the international border.

== Fauna ==
A population of African bush elephants is present around the mountain that ventures deep into caves to access salt licks. This population was formerly present around the entire mountain, but has since been reduced to the Kenyan side, where they venture into Kitum Cave.

There are several disjunct populations of mammal species that are restricted to Mount Elgon, including the Elgon shrew (Crocidura elgonius), Rudd's mole-rat (Tachyoryctes ruddi), and Thomas's pygmy mouse (Mus sorella). There are also several disjunct populations of rare bird species, including Sharpe's longclaw (Macronyx sharpei), Hunter's cisticola (Cisticola hunteri), Jackson's spurfowl (Pternistis jacksoni), and the Elgon francolin (Scleroptila elgonensis).

An endemic subspecies of the bushbuck (Tragelaphus scriptus heterochrous) is restricted to the mountain. The possibly extinct Du Toit's torrent frog (Arthroleptides dutoiti), considered an EDGE species due to its evolutionary distinctiveness, is known only from a single specimen collected on the Kenyan side of the mountain.

== Flora ==
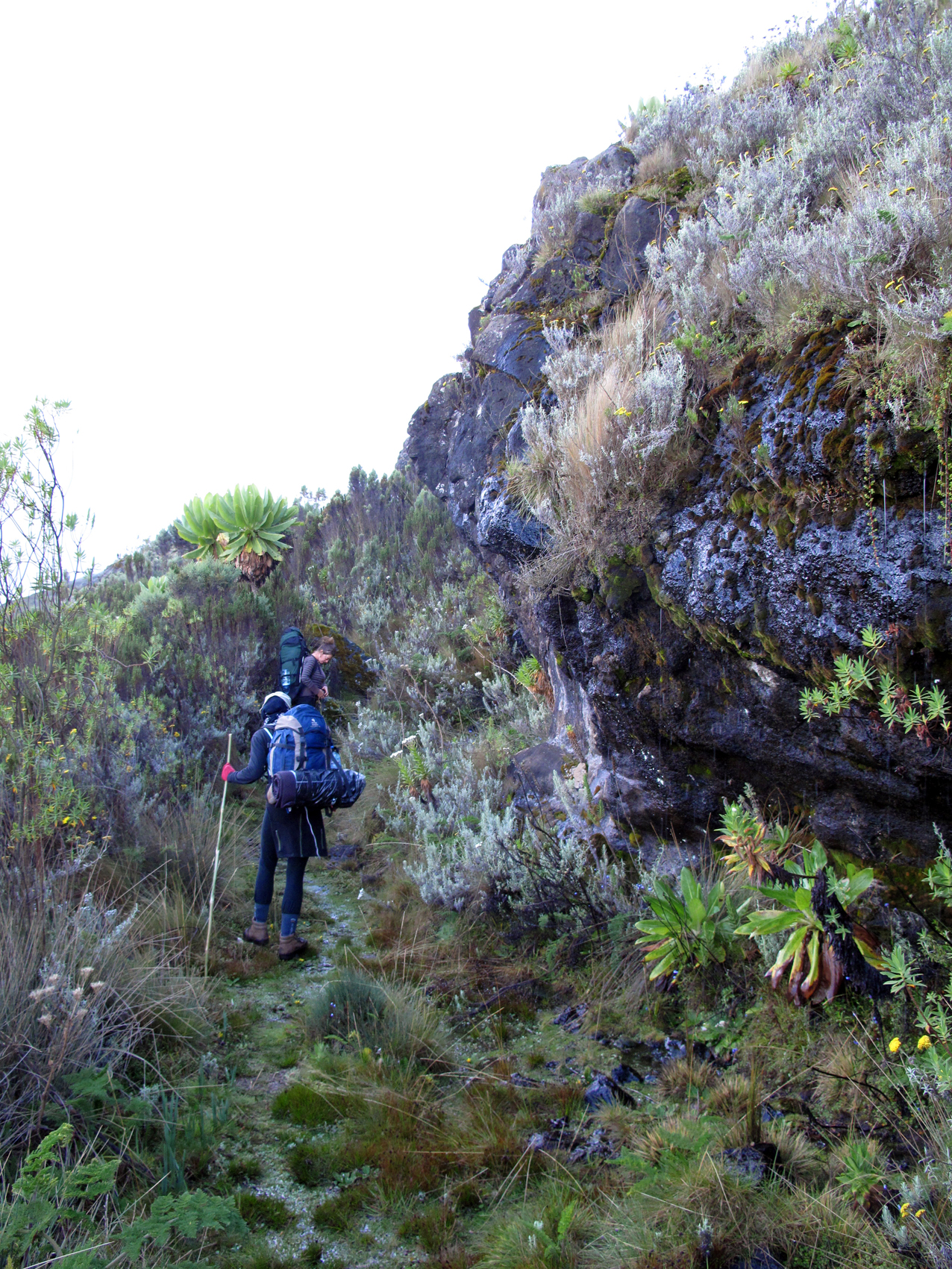
Mount Elgon

Some rare plants are found on the mountain, including Ardisiandra wettsteinii, Carduus afromontanus, Echinops hoehnelii, Ranunculus keniensis, and Romulea keniensis.

== Local ethnicities ==
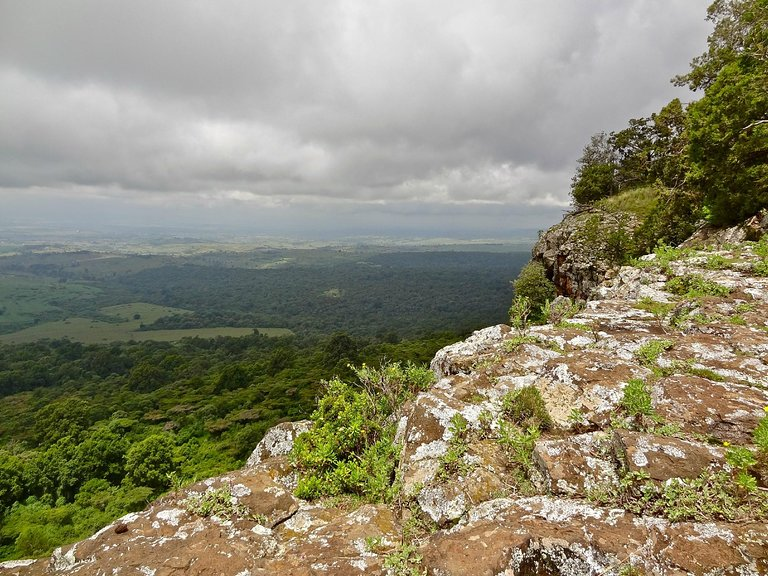
Mount Elgon

Mount Elgon and its tributaries are home to five tribes: the Bagisu, the Mbay, Sor, Sapiiny, Koony, Someek, Pook, and the Ogiek, better known in the region under the derogatory umbrella term Ndorobo.

== See also ==
- List of Ultras of Africa
- 2010 Ugandan landslide
- List of volcanoes in Kenya
- Elgon languages
- Mount Elgon insurgency
- Breast shaped hills
- Kakapel Rockshelter
