= Kalenjin languages =

Southern Nilotic language family

Kalenjin
- Geographic distribution: western Kenya, eastern Uganda, northern Tanzania
- Linguistic classification: Nilo-Saharan?: Eastern Sudanic; Southern Eastern; Nilotic; Southern; Kalenjin
- Subdivisions: Elgon; Nandi–Markweta; Okiek–Akie; Pökoot

Language codes
- ISO 639-3: kln
- Glottolog: kale1246

The Kalenjin languages are a family of a dozen Southern Nilotic languages spoken in Kenya, eastern Uganda and northern Tanzania. The term Kalenjin comes from an expression meaning 'I say (to you)' or 'I have told you' (present participle tense). Kalenjin in this broad linguistic sense should not be confused with Kalenjin as a term for the common identity the Nandi-speaking peoples of Kenya assumed halfway through the twentieth century; see Kalenjin people and Kalenjin language.

== Branches ==
The Kalenjin languages are classified within the Glottolog database as follows:

- Kalenjin
  - Central Kalenjin
    - Kipsigis
    - Plateau Central Kalenjin
      - Tugen
      - Western Plateau Central Kalenjin
        - Keiyo
        - Nandi
        - Terik
  - Elgon–Mau Kalenjin
    - Kupsabiny
    - Sabaot
  - Northern Kalenjin
    - Markweeta
    - Pökoot
  - Okiek–Akie
    - Akie
    - Okiek

== Comparative vocabulary ==
Sample basic vocabulary of Kalenjin languages from van Otterloo (1979), and Proto-Southern Nilotic from Rottland (1982):

Language	eye	ear	nose	tooth	tongue	mouth	blood	bone	tree	water	to eat	name
Proto-Southern Nilotic	*kɔːŋ, *kɔŋ	*iːt	*ser	*keːL-ɑt	*ŋɛLyɛp	*kʊːt		*kaːw	*kɛːt	*peR		*kɑːRɪn
Nandi	ko̱ːnda̱	iːtit	seruːt	ke̱ːlde̱t	ŋe̱lye̱pta̱	ku̱ːti̱t	korotiːk	kaːweːt	keːtit	beːk	keam	ka̱ːyne̱ːt
Kipsigis	ko̱ːnda̱	iːtit	seruːt	ke̱ːlde̱t	ŋe̱lye̱pta̱	ku̱ːti̱t	korotiːk	kaːweːt	keːtit	beːk	keam	ka̱ːyne̱ːt
Terik	ko̱ːŋda̱	iːtit	seruːt	ke̱ːnde̱t	ŋe̱nye̱pta̱	ku̱ːti̱t	korotiːk	kaːweːt	keːtit	beːk	keam	ka̱ːyne̱ːt
Keiyo	ko̱ːnda̱	iːtit	seruːt	ke̱ːlde̱t	ŋe̱lye̱pta̱	ku̱ːti̱t	korotiːk	kaːweːt	keːtit	beːk	keam	ka̱ːyne̱ːt
South Tugen	ko̱ːŋda̱	iːtit	seruː(t)	ke̱ːlde̱(t)	ŋe̱lye̱pta̱	ku̱ːti̱	korotiːk	kaːweː	keːt(it)	beːk	keam	ka̱ːyne̱ːt
North Tugen	ko̱ːŋ	iːt	ser̃	ke̱ːla̱t	ŋe̱lye̱p	ku̱ːt	koroti	kaːwe	keːt	beːy	keam	ka̱ːyne̱
Kony-Sabaot	ko̱ːŋda̱	iːtit	serwut	ke̱ːlde̱t	ŋe̱lye̱pta̱	ku̱ːti̱t	korotiːk	kaːweːt	keːtit	peːgo	keam	ka̱ːyne̱ːt
Cherang'any	ko̱ːnda̱/ko̱ːŋ	iːtit	seruːt	ke̱ːla̱t	ŋe̱lye̱p	ku̱ːt(i̱t)	korotiːk	kaːwe	keːt	beːy	keam	ka̱ːyne̱
Talai	ko̱ːŋ	iːt	ser̃	ke̱ːla̱t	ŋa̱lya̱p	ku̱ːt	koroti	kaːwa	keːt	pʰeːy	keam	ka̱ːyne̱
Endo	ko̱ːŋ	iːt	ser̃	ke̱ːla̱t	ŋa̱lya̱p	ku̱ːt	koroti/kisun	kaːwa	keːt	bu̱r̃	keam	ka̱r̃e̱n
East Pokot	koːŋ	yiːt	sa̱r̃	ke̱ːla̱t	ŋa̱lya̱p	ku̱ːt	kisʉn	kaːwaʔ	keːt	pʉːɣ	keam	ka̱ːyne̱ːt
