= Akiek =

Akiek may refer to:

- Okiek people, an ethnic group in Kenya and Tanzania
- Ogiek language, a language spoken by the Okiek people
- Akie people, an ethnic group in Tanzania
- Akie language, a language spoken by the Akie people
