= Ogiek language =

Nilotic language spoken in Kenya and Tanzania

Ogiek
- Okiek, Akiek
- Native to: Kenya, Tanzania
- Region: Kinare: Kinare, Kenya, on the eastern slope of the Rift Valley. Sogoo: Kenya, southern Mau forest between the Amala and Ewas Ng'iro rivers. Akiek: Tanzania, southern part of Arusha Region.
- Ethnicity: Okiek, Akie
- Native speakers: 79,000 in Kenya (2009 census); A few older speakers in Tanzania
- Language family: Nilo-Saharan?: Eastern Sudanic; Nilotic; Southern Nilotic; Kalenjin; Okiek–Akie; Ogiek
- Dialects: Kinare †; Sogoo; Akie

Language codes
- ISO 639-3: oki
- Glottolog: okie1245
- ELP: Okiek
- Linguasphere: 04-CAA-e

Ogiek (also Okiek and Akiek) is a Southern Nilotic language of the Kalenjin family spoken or once spoken by the Ogiek peoples, scattered groups of hunter-gatherers in Southern Kenya and Northern Tanzania. Most Ogiek speakers have assimilated to cultures of surrounding peoples: the Akie in northern Tanzania now speak Maasai and the Ogiek of Kinare, Kenya now speak Gikuyu. Ndorobo is a term considered derogatory, occasionally used to refer to various groups of hunter-gatherers in this area, including the Ogiek.

== Dialects ==
There are three main Ogiek varieties that have been documented, though there are several dozen named local Ogiek groups:

- Kinare, spoken around the Kenyan place Kinare on the eastern slope of the Rift Valley. The Kinare dialect is extinct, and Rottland (1982:24-25) reports that he found a few old men from Kinare in 1976, married with Kikuyu women and integrated in the Kikuyu culture, whose parents had lived in the forests around Kinare as honey-gathering Ogiek. They called themselves /akié:k pa kínáre/, i.e. Ogiek of Kinare.
- Sogoo (or Sokóò), spoken in the southern Mau Forest between the Amala and Ewas Ng'iro rivers (Heine 1973). The actual status of the Sogoo dialect is unclear. Bernd Heine included some Sogoo vocabulary in his 'Vokabulare ostafrikanischer Restsprachen' (1973). Franz Rottland, following Heine's directions, came across a Sogoo settlement of ten round huts in 1977, and reported that he was told that there were several other Sogoo settlements in the immediate surroundings (Rottland 1982:25). The Sogoo speakers had contact with the Kipsikii, another Kalenjin people, and were able to point out lexical differences between their own language and Kipsigis. Ten years later, Gabriele Sommer (1992:389) classified the Sogoo dialect as being threatened by extinction. The Sogoo variety was recorded in an area where Kipchorng'wonek Okiek reside (Sogoo is the name of a settlement/center there). Extensive texts from naturally occurring conversation recorded in both Kipchorng'wonek communities and Kaplelach Okiek communities are available in the publications of Dr. Corinne Kratz.
- Akie (or Akiek), spoken in Tanzania in the southern part of Arusha region. Akie is spoken by various little groups in the steppes south of Arusha, which is the territory of the Maasai. Akie is probably dying out because many of its speakers have shifted to, or are shifting to, Maasai language. Maguire (1948:10) already reported a high level of bilinguality in Maasai, and remarked that "[t]he language of the Mósiro [an Akie clan name] is dying, as any language except Masai tends to do in the Masai country." In the 1980s, however, Corinne Kratz and James Woodburn visited Akie groups in Tanzania during survey research and found that they were fully bilingual in Akie and Maasai.

== Media ==
- Radio "Sogoot FM" founded in 2019 broadcasts in Ogiek.

== See also ==
- Okiek people
- Akie people

== Bibliography ==
- Heine, Bernd (1973) 'Vokabulare ostafrikanischer Restsprachen', Afrika und Übersee, 57, 1, pp. 38–49.
- Kratz, Corinne A. (1981) "Are the Okiek really Masai? or Kipsigis? or Kikuyu?" Cahiers d'Études africaines. Vol. 79 XX:3, pp. 355–68.
- Kratz, Corinne A. (1986) 'Ethnic interaction, economic diversification and language use: a report on research with Kaplelach and Kipchornwonek Okiek', Sprache und Geschichte in Afrika, 7, 189—226.
- Kratz, Corinne A. (1989) "Okiek Potters and their Wares." In Kenyan Pots and Potters. Edited by J. Barbour and S. Wandibba. Nairobi: Oxford University Press.
- Kratz, Corinne A. (1994) Affecting Performance: Meaning, Movement and Experience in Okiek Women's Initiation. Washington DC: Smithsonian Institution Press.
- Kratz, Corinne A. (1999) "Okiek of Kenya." In Foraging Peoples: An Encyclopedia of Contemporary Hunter-Gatherers. Edited by Richard Lee and Richard Daly. Cambridge: Cambridge University Press, pp. 220–224.
- Kratz, Corinne A. (2000)"Gender, Ethnicity, and Social Aesthetics in Maasai and Okiek Beadwork." In Rethinking Pastoralism in Africa: Gender, Culture, and the Myth of the Patriarchal Pastoralist. Edited by Dorothy Hodgson. Oxford: James Currey Publisher, pp. 43–71.
- Kratz, Corinne A. (2001) "Conversations and Lives." In African Words, African Voices: Critical Practices in Oral History. Edited by Luise White, Stephan Miescher, and David William Cohen. Bloomington: Indiana University Press, pp. 127–161.
- Kratz, Corinne A. (2002) The Ones That Are Wanted: Communication and the Politics of Representation in a Photographic Exhibition. Berkeley: University of California Press.
- Maguire, R.A.J. (1948) 'Il-Torobo', Tanganyika Notes and Records, 25, 1–27.
- Rottland, Franz (1982) Die Südnilotischen Sprachen: Beschreibung, Vergelichung und Rekonstruktion (Kölner Beiträge zur Afrikanistik vol. 7). Berlin: Dietrich Reimer. (esp. pp. 26, 138-139)
- Sommer, Gabriele (1992) 'A survey on language death in Africa', in Brenzinger, Matthias (ed.) Language Death: Factual and Theoretical Explorations with Special Reference to East Africa. Berlin/New York: Mouton de Gruyter, pp. 301–417.
