= Mosiro =

Mosiro may be:

- Mosiro people
- Mosiro language
