= Okiek =

Okiek or Ogiek may refer to:

- the Okiek people
- the Ogiek language
