= Mary Racelis =

Filipino sociologist, anthropologist, and development worker

Mary Racelis-Hollnsteiner
- Born: Mary Racelis; 1932 (age 93–94)

Mary Racelis-Hollnsteiner (née Racelis) (born 1932) is a Filipino sociologist, anthropologist, and development worker. She has been a faculty member at the Ateneo de Manila University in the Philippines since 1960, becoming the first female professor at the university.

She is currently a research scientist at the Institute of Philippine Culture of the Ateneo de Manila University. Her research interests include poverty, urbanization, civil society, and community development.

== Early life and education ==
A child of a Filipino father and American mother, Racelis was born in Manila, Philippines in 1932. According to genealogist Mona Magno Veluz, from her mother's side, she is the great-great-great-great-granddaughter of American Founding Father Patrick Henry and the 39th great-grandchild of Charlemagne. She attended her grade school in the Philippines, before moving to the United States with her family where she earned her high school diploma in New York. In 1954, she received her Bachelor of Arts, majoring in sociology and anthropology from Cornell University in Ithaca, New York. In 1955, she returned to the Philippines with husband, Helmut Hollsteiner and obtained a Master of Arts in sociology from the University of the Philippines Diliman in 1960.

== Career ==
From 1979 to 1983, she joined the UNICEF in New York as Senior Policy Specialist, Family/Child Welfare and Women's Development (1979–83). Racelis then became UNICEF Regional Director in Eastern and Southern Africa (1983–92). Upon returning to the Philippines in 1992 as Country Representative of the Ford Foundation (1992–97), and has served since 1997 as a consultant to the Philippine government, UNICEF, and various international agencies.

In 2003–04, she was appointed to the UN Secretary-General's Panel on United Nations—Civil Society Relations. She also worked on socio-cultural and gender issues in pro-poor sustainable tourism in the Greater Mekong Subregion.

She teaches sociology and anthropology courses at the Ateneo de Manila University and the University of the Philippines Diliman.

Racelis is a member of the board of trustees of the Philippine Rural Reconstruction Movement.

== Honors ==
In 1975, De La Salle University awarded her an honorary Doctorate in the Social Sciences. In 2003, the Ateneo de Manila University awarded her an honorary Doctor of Humanities.

In 2001, Racelis won the Philippine National Book Award, in the category of History, for the book Bearers of Benevolence: The Thomasites and Public Education in the Philippines, which she co-edited with Judy Celine Ick.

== Publications ==
- Making Philippine Cities Child Friendly: Voices of Children in Poor Communities (2005)
- Bearers of Benevolence: The Thomasites and Public Education in the Philippines, co-edited (2001)
