= Stockholm Environment Institute US Center =

International research organization

Coordinates: 42.408°N 71.125°W

The Stockholm Environment Institute (SEI) is an international research organization focusing on the issue of sustainable development. Stockholm Environment Institute has its headquarters in Stockholm with a network structure of permanent and associated staff worldwide and with centres the US, York and Oxford (England), Tallinn (Estonia), and Bangkok (Thailand).

SEI's US center is a research affiliate of Tufts University in Massachusetts and also has offices in Davis, California and Seattle, Washington. It conducts a diverse programme focusing on the social, technological and institutional requirements for a transition to sustainability. Its funders include the United Nations, the World Bank, and numerous foundations and national governments such as the United States, Sweden, Denmark, Germany, the Netherlands and the UK.

In addition to providing policy-relevant analyses, the Center works to build capacity in developing countries for integrated sustainability planning through training and collaboration on projects. Its decision support tools are widely used: LEAP for energy planning and climate change mitigation, WEAP for water resources planning and PoleStar for evaluating sustainable development strategies.

Its activities are organized into three programs:

- The Climate and Energy Program conducts energy system analyses, examines environmental consequences of energy use such as global warming, and develops policies for a transition to efficient and renewable energy technology.
- The Water Resources Program brings an integrated perspective to freshwater assessment, one that seeks sustainable water solutions by balancing the needs for basic water services, development and the environment.
- The Sustainable Development Studies Program takes a holistic perspective in assessing sustainability at global, regional, and national levels.
