= Glossina longipennis =

Scientific classification
- Kingdom: Animalia
- Phylum: Arthropoda
- Class: Insecta
- Order: Diptera
- Family: Glossinidae
- Genus: Glossina
- Species: G. longipennis

Binomial name
- Glossina longipennis Corti, 1895
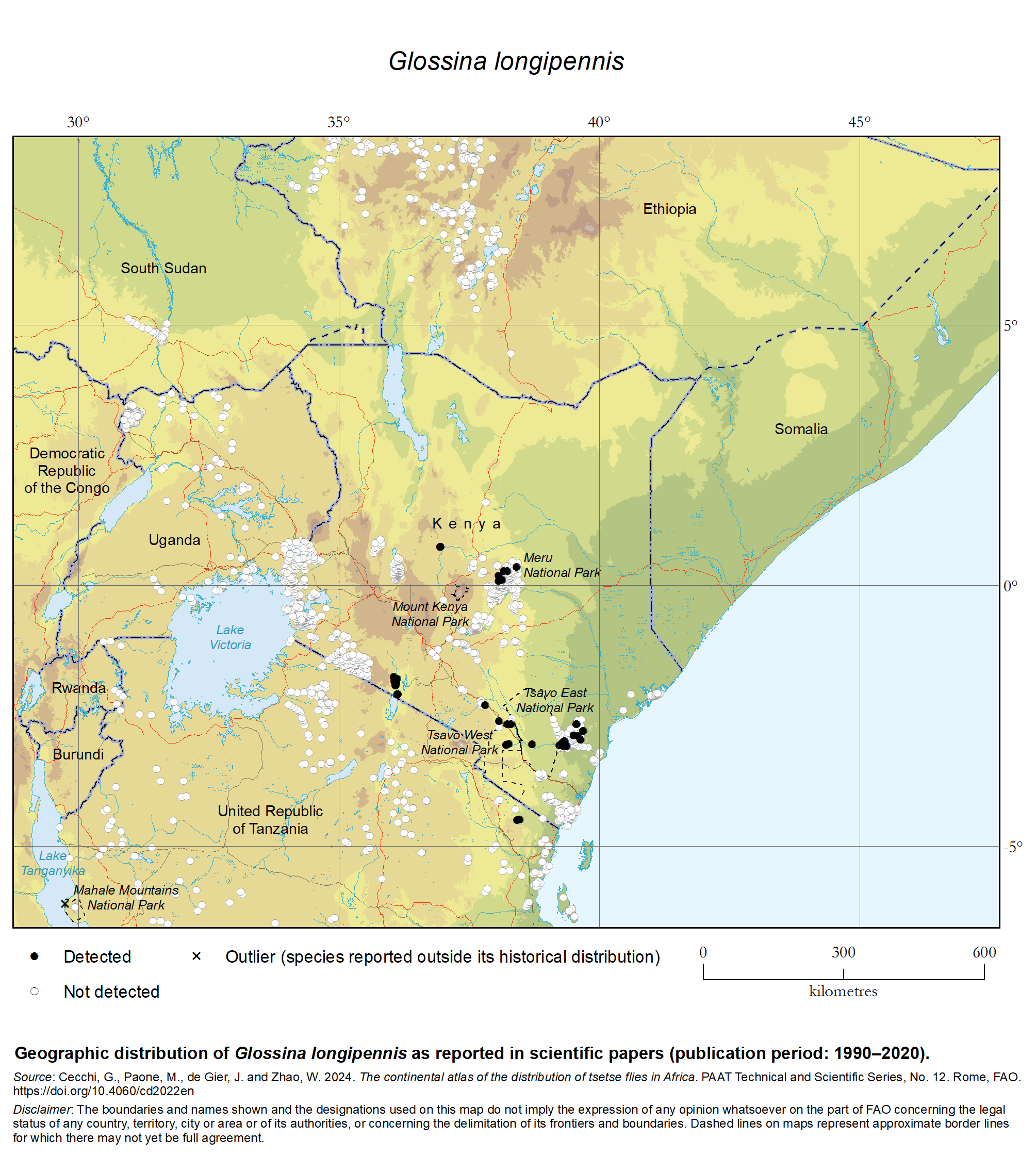
- Geographic distribution of Glossina longipennis as reported in scientific papers – Publication period 1990–2020

Species of tsetse fly

Glossina longipennis is one of the 23 recognized species of tsetse flies (genus Glossina), it belongs to the forest/fusca group (subgenus Austenina). However, the species is peculiar among those of the fusca group in that it inhabits dry areas.

== Distribution ==
The geographic distribution of Glossina longipennis was historically known to be centred in Kenya, but also extending into northern Tanzania and with small pockets in Ethiopia, Somalia, South Sudan and Uganda. However, a review of the scientific literature from 1990 – 2020 found confirmation of G. longipennis occurrence for only two countries; Kenya and the United Republic of Tanzania. In Kenya, the species was reported from several areas, including the Nguruman Escarpment, the Tsavo East National Park, the Tsavo West National Park, the Meru National Park, and the Ewaso Ng’iro river valley northwest of Mount Kenya. In the United Republic of Tanzania, G. longipennis was reported from the Tanga region, in the northeastern part of the country, while the report from the Mahale Mountains National Park on the shores of Lake Tanganyika is outside the historical distribution of G. longipennis, and it would therefore require confirmation. After 2020, confirmation of the occurrence of G. longipennis was also published for Ethiopia, and in particular from the Gibe River basin.

== Economic significance ==
The fly is a significant vector of bovine trypanosomiasis.
