= Naiyan Kiplagat =

Kenyan indigenous activist (born 1974)

- Born: 1974 (age 51–52); Ol Lalunga, Narok County, Kenya
- Occupation: Indigenous activist
- Years active: 2005–present
- Organization: Paran Women Group
- Known for: Restoring forests in the Great Rift Valley

Naiyan Jebet Kiplagat (born c. 1974) is a Kenyan human rights activist. A member of the Okiek people from the Great Rift Valley, in 2005 she co-founded the Paran Women Group, an indigenous women's group working to address the impact of climate change, patriarchy and poverty on women living in the Mau Forest.

== Personal life ==
Kiplagat was born into an Okiek family living in the Great Rift Valley in southwestern Kenya. She is also connected to the Maasai people through marriage. She lives in Ol Lalunga, a village in Narok County, Kenya, by the Mau Forest, with her four children.

== Activism ==
The Mau Forest has experienced significant deforestation, leading to changes in seasonal rainfall patterns, impacting pastures and livestock. The situation for indigenous communities dependent upon the forest were further impacted by illegal land allocations and land grabs during the presidency of Daniel arap Moi, with women required to walk four kilometres in order to access water.

In 2005, Kiplagat co-founded the Paran Women Group, which advocates for land restoration in the Great Rift Valley. The term paran comes from a Maasai word meaning "come together to assist each other". Based in Ol Lalunga, the group represents 64 Okiek and Maasai women's groups, with over 3000 members working to improve water and food security. Paran originally supported women to make and sell traditional beaded necklaces; it has since developed to assist women to establish tree nurseries to sell trees for reforestation, in addition to constructing and selling environmentally friendly stoves using charcoal briquettes rather than firewood. In addition, Paran helps women to plant vegetables and legumes, keep beehives, and collect medical herbs, as well as establishing communal kitchen gardens.

The Kenyan government granted Paran access to 200 acres of the Maasai Mau Forest block, one of 22 blocks making up the Mau Forest Complex. It also received 100, 000 USD to restore degraded land in the forest from the Terra Fund. Paran announced plans to plant 150, 000 native trees by 2030.

Kiplagat has criticised patriarchal norms in Kenya that prevent women from taking part in decision-making; she has described the oppression faced by indigenous women due to their gender and ethnicity as a "double marginalisation". Kiplagat supports women being involved in policy-making, budgeting, and planning, to ensure that they are gender-responsive. She recommends the use of indigenous knowledge to address the issue of climate change, and cited Paran's success as demonstrating that indigenous women can lead large-scale environmental restoration provided that they are given financial and technical support.

Kiplagat is a member of the African Indigenous Women Organisation, as well as the Swedish International Agricultural Network Initiative's expert group on drylands agroforestry.

== Recognition ==
In 2019, Kiplagat received the Prize for Women's Creativity in Rural Life from the Women's World Summit Foundation. At the 2023 United Nations Climate Change Conference in Dubai, United Arab Emirates, Kiplagat accepted the Climate Award on behalf of the Paran Women Group in recognition of their "climate-smart agriculture". That same year, Paran won the Gender Just Climate Solutions Award. In 2024, Kiplagat received the Alnoba Indigenous Leader Award.
