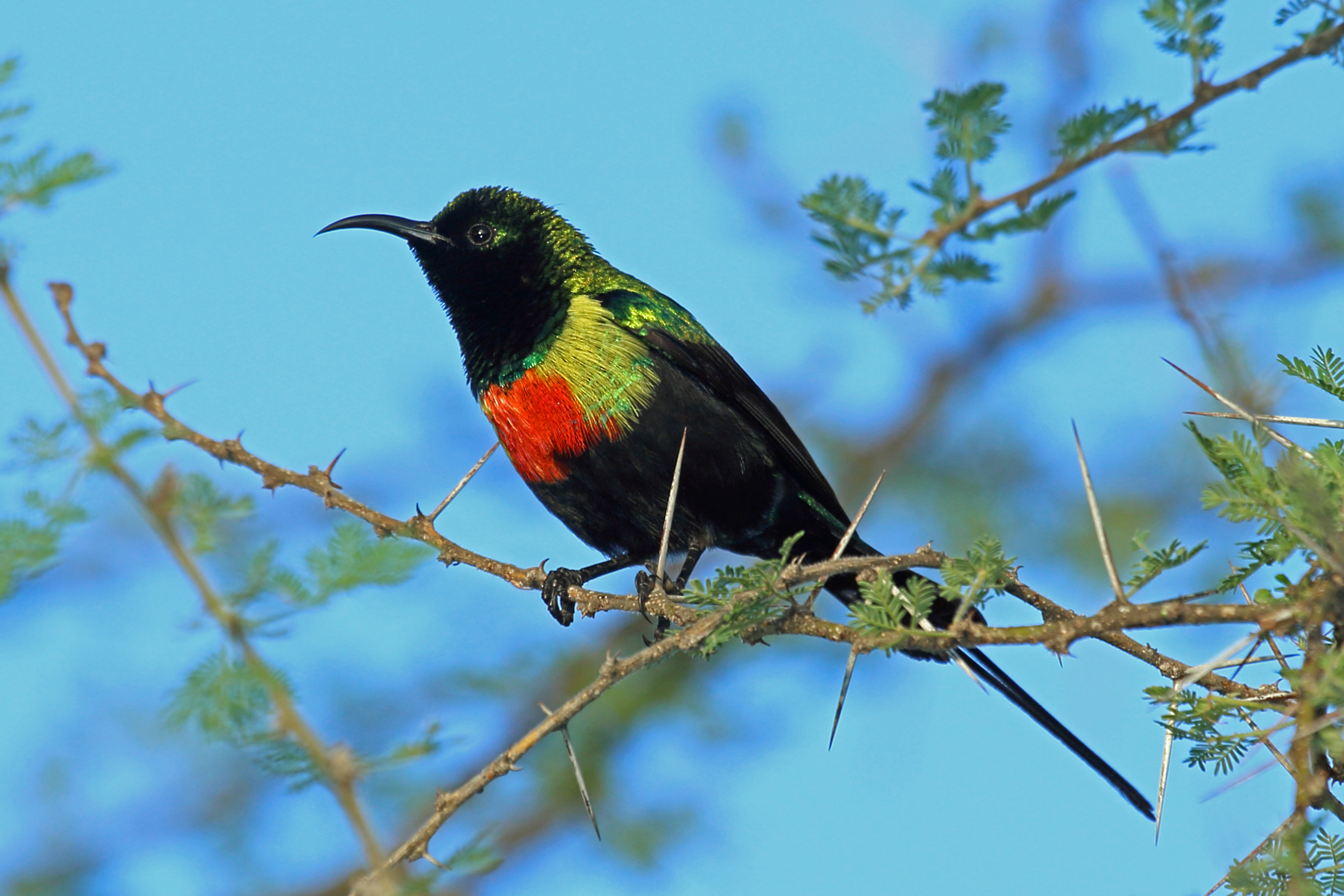
- In Tanzania

Conservation status
- Least Concern (IUCN 3.1)

Scientific classification
- Kingdom: Animalia
- Phylum: Chordata
- Class: Aves
- Order: Passeriformes
- Family: Nectariniidae
- Genus: Cinnyris
- Species: C. melanogastrus

Binomial name
- Cinnyris melanogastrus (Fischer, GA & Reichenow, 1884)

= Gorgeous sunbird =

Species of bird

The gorgeous sunbird (Cinnyris melanogastrus) is a small passerine bird in the sunbird family Nectariniidae that is found in southern Kenya and Tanzania. It was formerly placed in the genus Nectarinia, a genus of the Nectariniidae family, but was later transferred to the genus Cinnyris. It was also formerly considered to be conspecific with the beautiful sunbird.

== Taxonomy ==
The gorgeous sunbird was formally described in 1884 by the German explorer Gustav Fischer and ornithologist Anton Reichenow based on a specimen collected near the Nguruman Escarpment in southern Kenya. They coined the binomial name Nectarinia melanogastra. The specific epithet combines the Ancient Greek μελας/melas meaning "black" and γαστηρ/gastēr meaning "belly". The gorgeous sunbird is now one of 64 sunbirds placed in the genus Cinnyris that was introduced in 1816 by the French naturalist Georges Cuvier. It was formerly considered to be conspecific with the beautiful sunbird (Cinnyris pulchellus). The species were split based on the differences in morphology. The gorgeous sunbird is monotypic, with no subspecies being recognised.

== Description ==
Male gorgeous sunbirds have bright green feathers, a blue and black tail, and a yellow and red chest, which helps them stand out easily. They are about 15–17 cm (5.9–6.7 in) in length and weigh between 7–9.5 g (0.25–0.34 oz). They also have a tail as long as their bodies.

Female gorgeous sunbirds differ markedly from males, with the females appearing more subtle and neutral. Their bodies are mainly brown with a pale yellowish stripe behind the eye and a light yellow belly. They are a lot smaller, 11 cm (4.3 in) in length and 7–9.7 g (0.25–0.34 oz) in weight.

They both have the same crescent-shaped, slightly curved beak. The shape of their beaks makes it easier for them to drink nectar from flowers. Their chirps are said to be a jumble of high-pitched sounds, and they typically produce a rattling series.

== Habitat and range ==
This species lives in central Tanzania as well as south-central Kenya. The gorgeous sunbird does not migrate like many other birds, staying in its home environment all year round. This is due to the environment being stable in weather and food supply all year. It is mostly found in elevations between 700 and 1,300 m (2,300 and 4,300 ft) above sea level. It likes to live in areas like shrublands, savannahs, and forests.

== Diet and foraging ==
The gorgeous sunbird has a diet similar to the beautiful sunbird (Cinnyris pulchellus). Their diet consists of nectar, flowers, insects, and spiders. These birds also forage from many plants in their region and often are seen foraging flowers in gardens.

== Nesting ==
These birds typically have a purse-shaped nest roughly 1-5 metres above the ground and are made up of dry leaves, vegetation, feathers, and cobwebs.

== Conservation status ==
The gorgeous sunbird is not endangered according to the IUCN Red List. The population size for this species is still unknown. Regardless, it is believed to have a stable population. The entire territorial range of the gorgeous sunbird is a conservation site to prevent a decrease in population from outside influences. There are limited threats to this species, so no other special conservation actions are needed.
