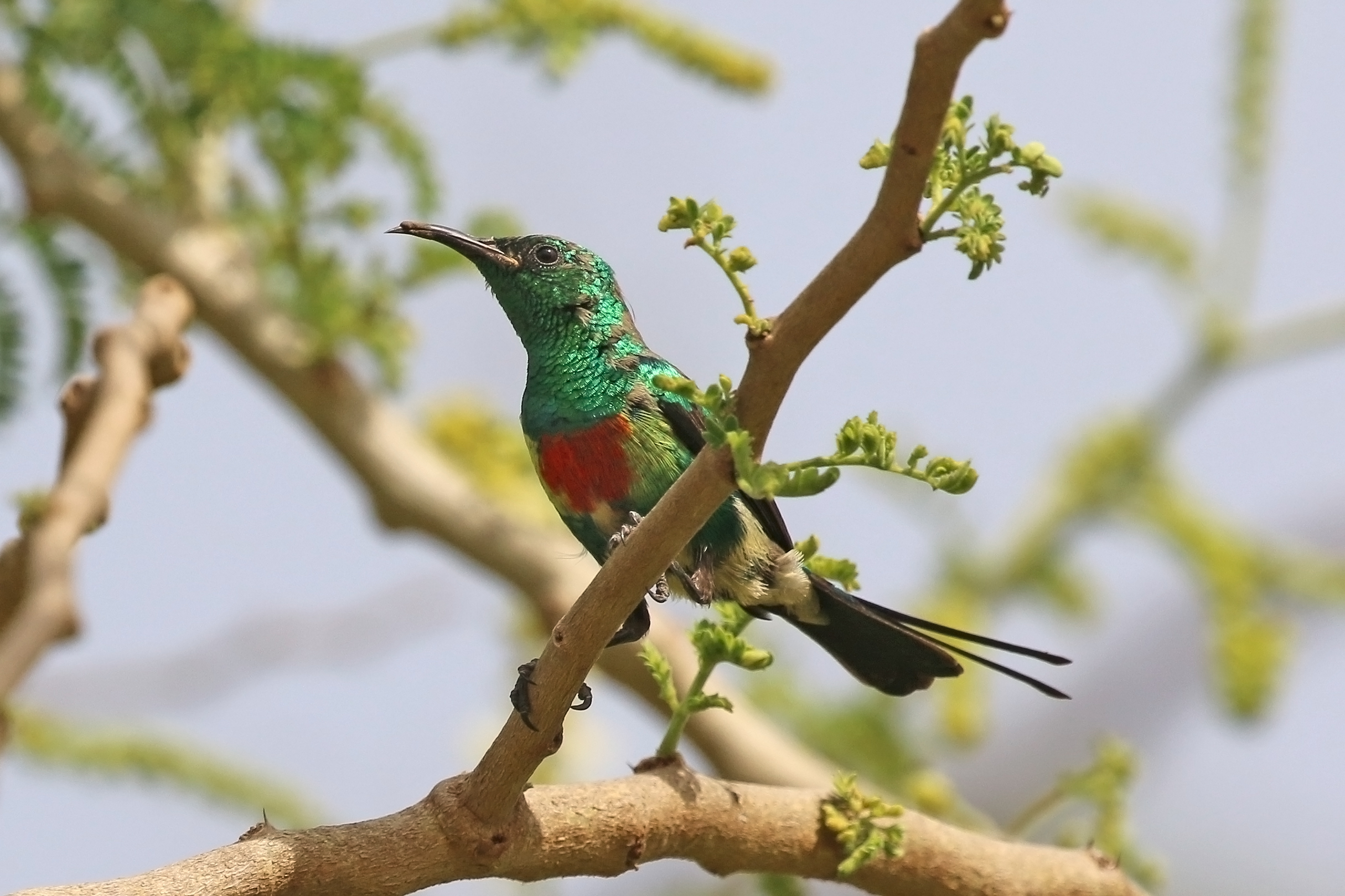
- In the Gambia

Conservation status
- Least Concern (IUCN 3.1)

Scientific classification
- Kingdom: Animalia
- Phylum: Chordata
- Class: Aves
- Order: Passeriformes
- Family: Nectariniidae
- Genus: Cinnyris
- Species: C. pulchellus

Binomial name
- Cinnyris pulchellus (Linnaeus, 1766)

Synonyms
- Certhia pulchella Linnaeus, 1766

= Beautiful sunbird =

Species of bird

The beautiful sunbird (Cinnyris pulchellus), formerly placed in the genus Nectarinia, is a small passerine bird in the sunbird family Nectariniidae. It is native to tropical Africa, its range extending from Senegal and Guinea in the west to Sudan, South Sudan, Ethiopia, Tanzania and Kenya in the east. It was formerly considered to be conspecific with the gorgeous sunbird (Cinnyris melanogastrus).

== Taxonomy ==
The beautiful sunbird was formally described in 1766 by the Swedish naturalist Carl Linnaeus in the twelfth edition of his Systema Naturae under the binomial name Certhia pulchella. Linnaeus based his account on "Le grimpereau à longue queue du Sénégal" that had been described and illustrated in 1760 by the French zoologist Mathurin Jacques Brisson. The specific epithet is from Latin pulchellum meaning "very pretty" or "beautiful little". Formerly placed in the genus Nectarinia, the beautiful sunbird is now one of 64 sunbirds placed in the genus Cinnyris that was introduced in 1816 by the French naturalist Georges Cuvier. It was previously considered to be conspecific with the gorgeous sunbird (Cinnyris melanogastrus) but the species were split based on the differences in morphology. The beautiful sunbird is monotypic: no subspecies are recognised.

== Description ==
Beautiful sunbirds are tiny, only 10 cm (4 in) long, although the breeding male's long tail adds another 5 cm (2 in). They have medium-length thin down-curved bills and brush-tipped tubular tongues, both of which are adaptations to their nectar feeding. The male has a black head, bright metallic green upper parts, scarlet breast bordered with yellow and black belly. The central feathers of the teal are greatly elongated. The female is brown above with yellowish underparts.

== Distribution and habitat ==
The beautiful sunbird occurs in Benin, Burkina Faso, Cameroon, Central African Republic, Chad, Democratic Republic of the Congo, Côte d'Ivoire, Eritrea, Ethiopia, Gambia, Ghana, Guinea, Guinea-Bissau, Kenya, Mali, Mauritania, Niger, Nigeria, Senegal, Sierra Leone, South Sudan, Sudan, Tanzania, Togo and Uganda. This species is found in a variety of open habitats with some trees, including savannah, riverside thickets, mangroves, beachsides and gardens.

== Behaviour and ecology ==
The sunbirds are a group of very small Old World passerine birds which feed largely on nectar, although they will also take insects, especially when feeding young. Flight is fast and direct on their short wings. Most species can take nectar by hovering like a hummingbird, but usually perch to feed most of the time. The beautiful sunbird is a common breeder across sub-Saharan tropical Africa. One or two eggs are laid in a suspended nest in a tree. It is a seasonal migrant within its range.

== Status ==
The beautiful sunbird has a wide range and a large total population. It is a common bird and the International Union for Conservation of Nature has assessed its conservation status as being of "least concern".

== Gallery ==
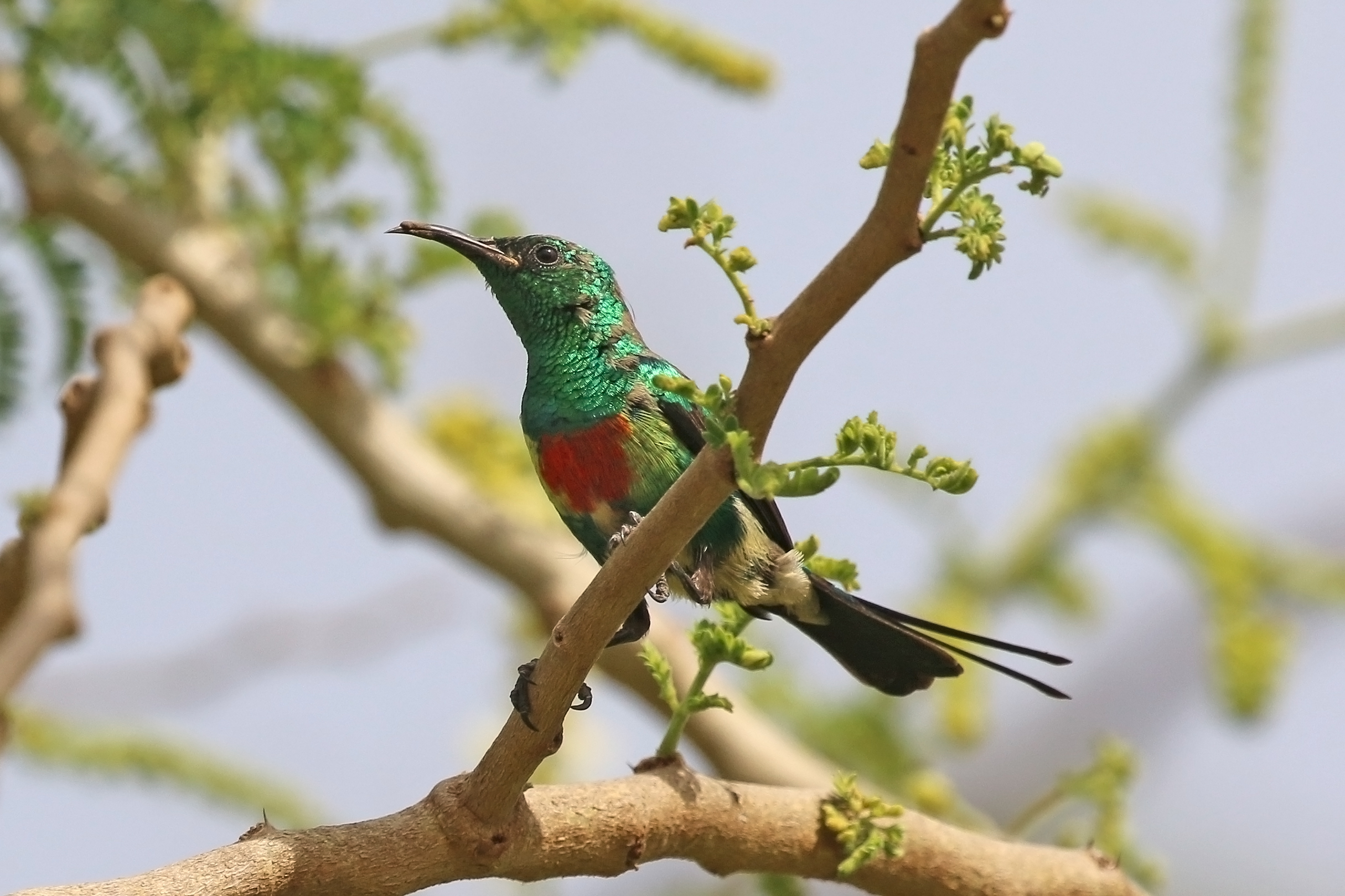
male C. p. pulchellus
Gambia

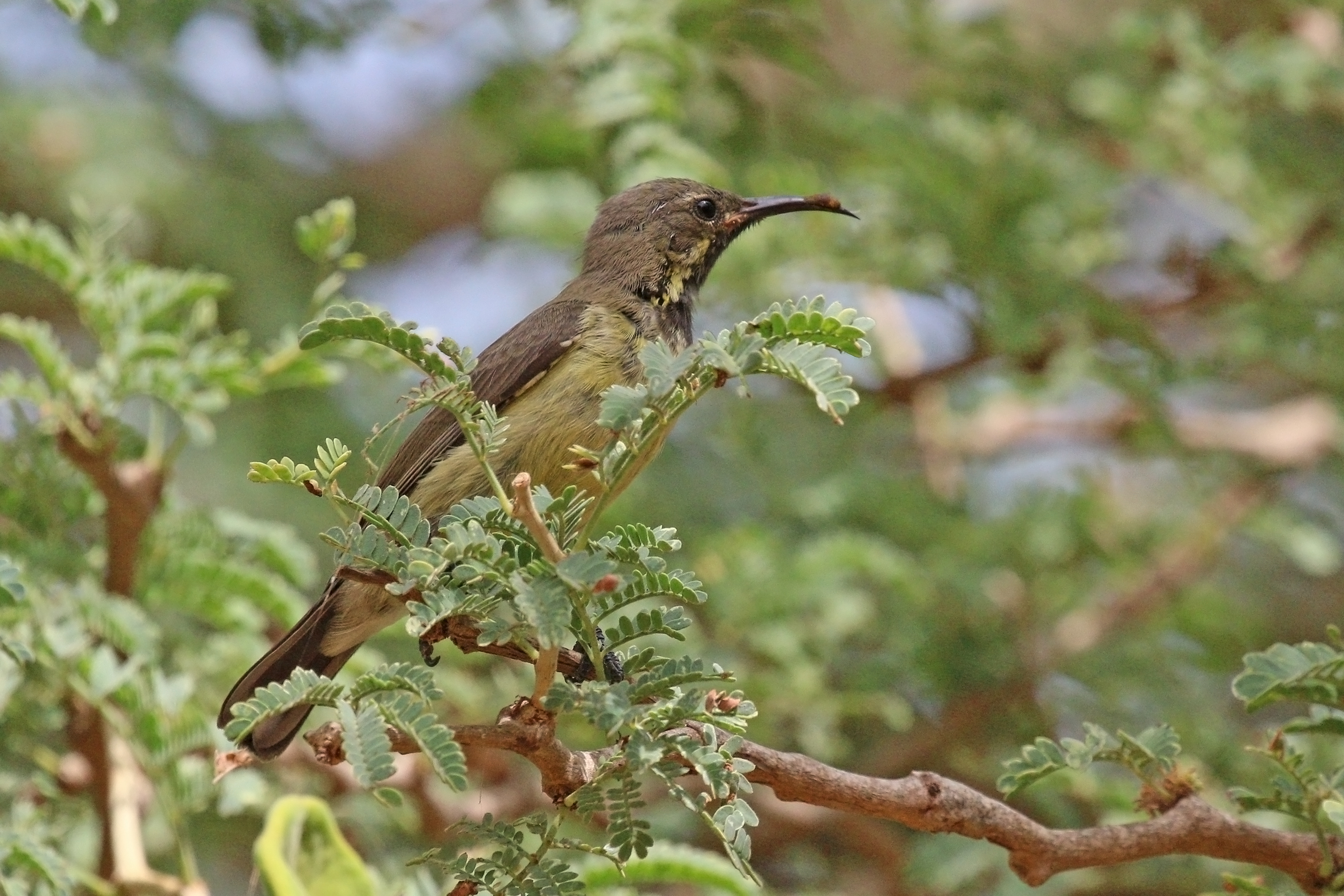
juvenile C. p. pulchellus
Gambia

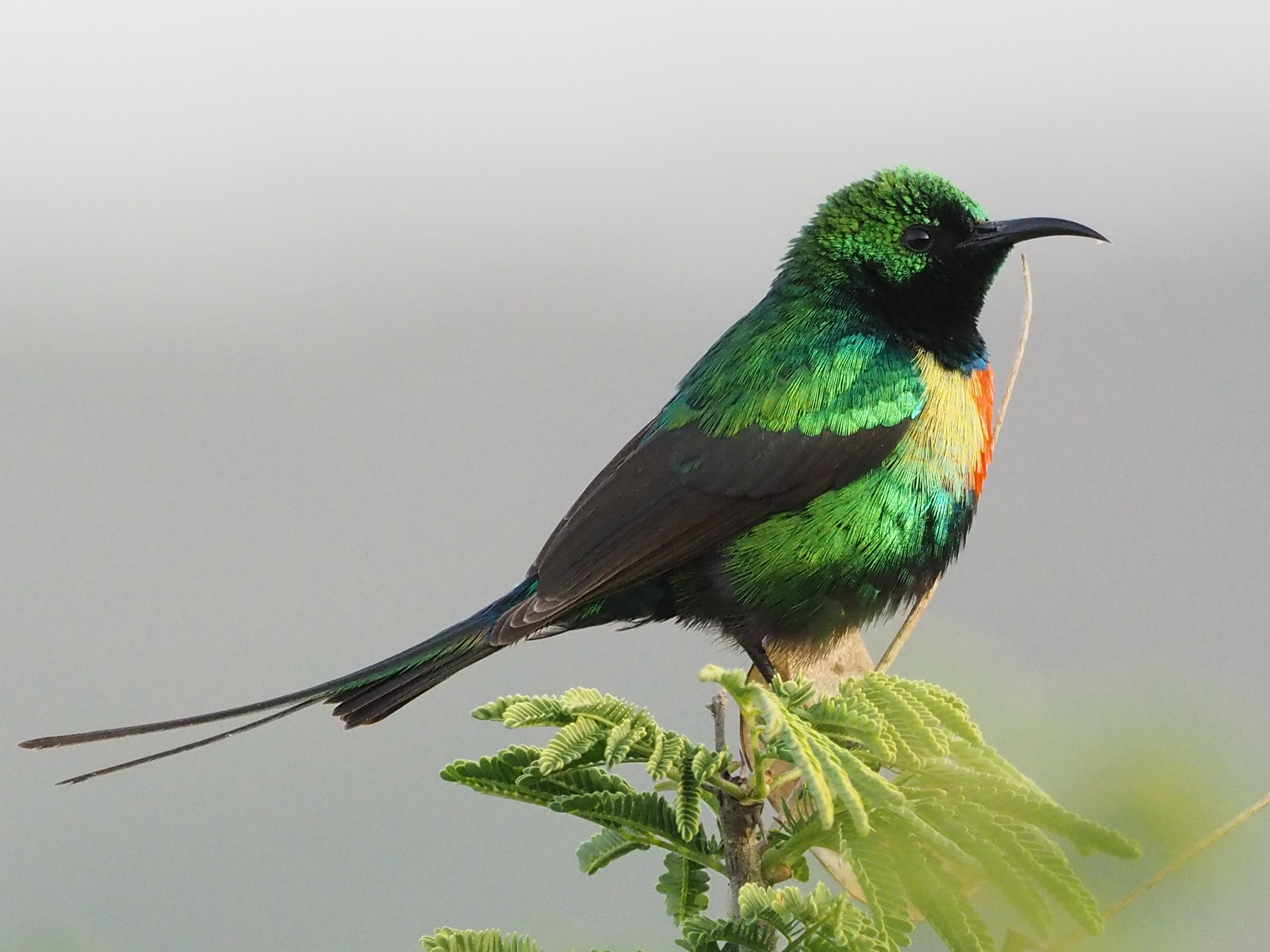
male C. p. melanogastrus
Ethiopia

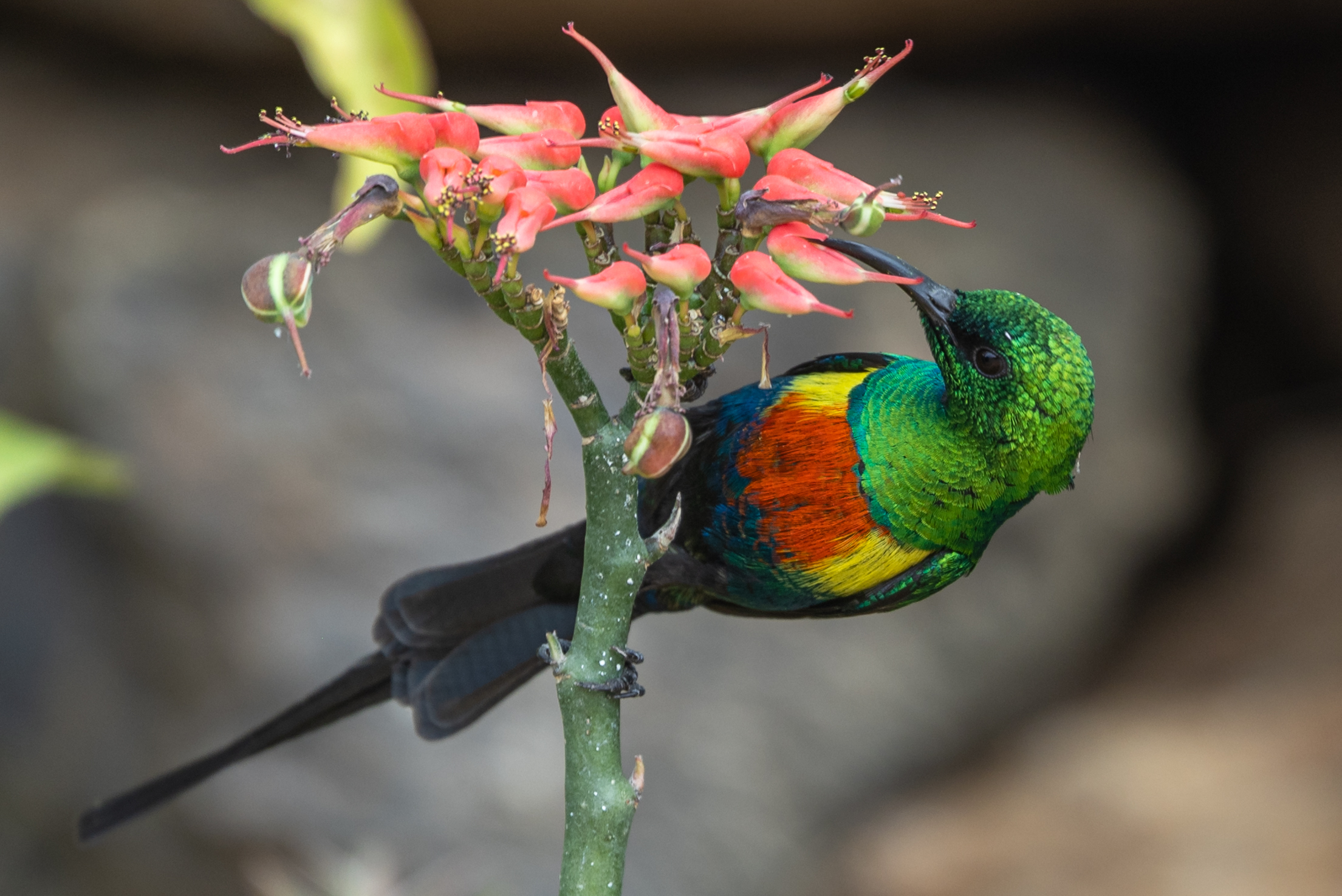
C. p. pulchellus
Kenya
