= Mau Forest =

Forest in Kenya

Coordinates: 0°36′35″S 35°44′08″E

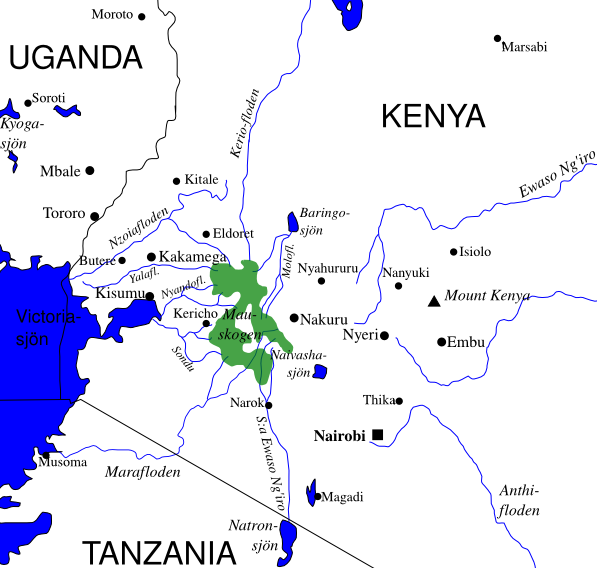
The Mau forest and some of the rivers originating there.

Mau Forest is a forest complex in the Rift Valley of Kenya. It is the largest indigenous montane forest in East Africa. The Mau Forest complex has an area of 273,300 hectares (675,000 acres).

The forest area has some of the highest rainfall rates in Kenya. Mau Forest is the largest drainage basin in Kenya. Numerous rivers originate from the forest, including the Southern Ewaso Ng'iro, Sondu River, Mara River and Njoro River. These rivers feed Lake Victoria, Lake Nakuru and Lake Natron. The western slopes of the Mau Escarpment are covered by the Mau Forest.

== Ecology ==
Typical tree species in the Mau Forest include Aningeria adolfi-friederici, Strombosia scheffleri, and Polyscias kikuyuensis. Olea capensis, Prunus africana, Albizia gummifera, and Podocarpus milanjianus are also found there.

Endemic bird species in the area include Hartlaub's turaco (Tauraco hartlaubi), Hunter's cisticola (Cisticola hunteri) and Jackson's spurfowl (Pternistis jacksoni).

== Destruction ==
The forest has been traditionally inhabited by Ogiek people, whose hunter-gatherer lifestyle is sustainable. However, due to immigration from other ethnic groups, large parts of the forest area have been cleared for settlement. Human activities, especially logging, have led to deforestation of more than a quarter of the area since 1973. This is due to the increased charcoal trade in places like Narok town and the supply of logs to saw mills in Baringo, Nakuru and Narok counties.

In 2008, the inauguration of the Sondu-Miriu hydro power plant was postponed due to low water levels, that are said to be resulting from the destruction of the Mau Forest.

== Mau Forest evictions ==
In the summer of 2008 there was a political row over resettlement of people, who had been allocated land there during the KANU era during the 1980s and 1990s. Some of the settlers are famed politicians, like Franklin Bett and Zakayo Cheruiyot. In 2004 Paul Ndung’u released "Ndungu Report", which listed these land allocations, terming them illegal and recommended revocation of them. Some evictions were implemented between 2004 and 2006, without a resettlement scheme.

On July 15, 2008, the then Prime Minister, Raila Odinga issued an order that the evictions be implemented by October 2008 in order to protect the forest from destruction. The order has been opposed by number of Rift Valley area politicians, led by Isaac Ruto. Some politicians, led by Minister of Agriculture William Ruto, propose that if evictions are implemented, the government should allocate them land elsewhere.

The evictions began in November 2009. Some prominent people are set to lose their land, including family members of former president Daniel arap Moi. Also under threat is the Kiptagich Tea Factory owned by former president Moi.

== Activism ==
In 2005, Naiyan Kiplagat co-founded the Paran Women Group, which advocates for land restoration in the Mau Forest. Based in Ol Lalunga, the group represents 64 Okiek and Maasai women's groups, with over 3000 members working to improve water and food security. Paran originally supported women to make and sell traditional beaded necklaces; it has since developed to assist women to establish tree nurseries to sell trees for reforestation, in addition to constructing and selling environmentally friendly stoves using charcoal briquettes rather than firewood.
