= Sustainable Mekong Research Network =

Environmental group

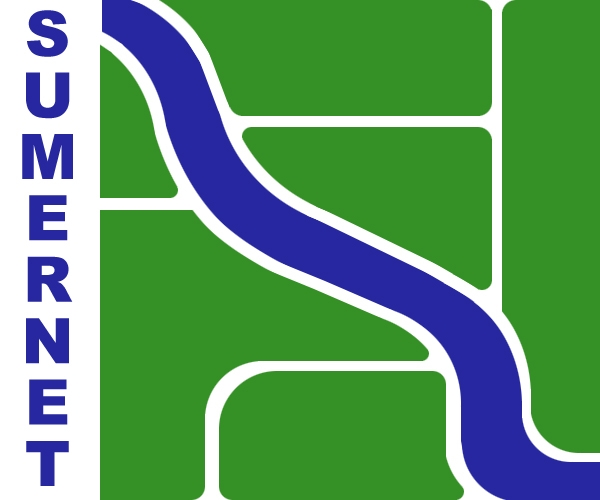
SUMERNET logo

The Sustainable Mekong Research Network (SUMERNET) is a network of organizations committed to the sustainable development of the Greater Mekong Region. Launched in 2005, SUMERNET supports policy-relevant research and outreach activities to inform and engage policy-makers, planners and stakeholders. Within this context, it pursues an evolving agenda in response to questions and policy issues that arise in the region. Current research themes are climate-compatible development, regional economic integration, and ecosystem services and local development. The network works on a range of issues including natural ecosystems governance, floods and natural disasters, climate change and adaptation, and transboundary resource flows.

== Origins and Foundations ==
SUMERNET was launched in 2005, financed by the Swedish International Development Agency (Sida). Since then, SUMERNET's work has also attracted support from the Climate and Development Knowledge Network (CDKN) and from partner institutes across the region. Membership has grown from the 14 organizations, to more than 50 affiliated organizations now.

SUMERNET was conceived at a time of accelerated development in the region. Major roads and other infrastructure projects were being planned and built; bilateral and multilateral economic and trade agreements were being made, and there was a vigorous debate going on about the future of the Mekong Region. Many development agencies expressed concerns and called for an integrated approach that would incorporate a greater diversity of views and perspectives into regional planning and policy.

SUMERNET was established to help meet that need by supporting and promoting the use of scientific evidence in policy-making, with the overarching goal of contributing to sustainable development in the Mekong Region. In the seven years since its inception, SUMERNET has sponsored policy-relevant research and worked to create an "enabling environment" for researchers and decision-makers to engage with one another.

The SUMERNET Secretariat, at the Stockholm Environment Institute (SEI) Asia Centre in Bangkok, actively supports the network's activities, drawing on both regional and global intellectual resources.

== Mission ==
SUMERNET's mission is to "inform and influence sustainable development in the Mekong Region by supporting credible, collaborative research; stimulating independent discussions on key regional issues, and engaging with decision-makers and stakeholders to foster more effective and sustainable policies and programmes."

A key aspect of SUMERNET's work is to bridge science and policy; SUMERNET does this by choosing research questions that are directly relevant to current policy debates, engaging decision-makers in all aspects of our activities, and building capacity for sustainable development through workshops and other activities. SUMERNET also emphasizes collaboration, networking and knowledge-sharing, connecting partners in different countries through our projects and events, and works to strengthen research capacity across the region.

== Implementation Phases ==
Since the time of its establishment, SUMERNET has coordinated three implementation phases: Phase I (2005–2008), Phase II (2010–2013) and currently Phase III (2014–2017).

=== Phase I (2005–2008) ===
Phase I established SUMERNET as a genuinely independent regionally owned platform and has a "voice" in a way that other comparable networks do not, which are often seen to be activist and essentially foreign-driven and discounted in influence as a result. Sumernet Phase I also had positive impacts for its partners (both individuals and their institutions) in terms of capacity-building through both training and conduct of research and also through the promotion of cross-border linkages.

Phase I supported nine research projects, namely:

1. Incentives as a means to achieving sustainable land and water management in the Greater Mekong Sub-Region: Developing a framework for PES in the hydropower sector in the region.
2. Assessment of regional value chains for promoting sustainable fisheries development in the Mekong Delta
3. Study on local community institutions to cope with the flood situation of the Mekong region
4. The potential role of integrated farming systems (IFS) for poverty alleviation in the Mekong Basin: An assessment of farmer based networks in promoting IFS
5. Towards policy relevant knowledge in the Mekong: Exploring the links between sustainability research and policy
6. Regional migration: a feasible option for livelihood diversification for the regional poor?
7. Incentive Based Approaches for Sustainability in the Mekong
8. Meeting regional and global demands for rubber: A viable option for poverty alleviation in the Mekong Basin?
9. Rubber: Costs or Benefits to the Lao PDR?

By the end of Phase I, SUMERNET is well on in the process of becoming known as a knowledge producer and a focus of research collaborators and development actors. This gives it a place in regional development as a focus of research and a policy forum. SUMERNET aims to make more headway in policy engagement and policy impact in a second phase. Phase I has served as a "testing ground" for this new alliance and its agenda for producing knowledge.

=== Phase II (2010–2013) ===
SUMERNET Phase II has been established upon the basis of policy-relevant collaborative research among researchers in Mekong region. SUMERNET, since the beginning of the current phase, has been encouraging researchers to develop collaboration with other researchers in other countries in the Mekong region, therefore typical feature of SUMERNET research project in Phase II is that the researchers originate from more than one country. This cross-country collaboration has strengthened the relevance of SUMERNET research findings beyond the national and sub-national levels into the regional policy level.

In Phase II, SUMERNET has invested its resources to develop capacity of researchers in the region by incorporating mentoring support of research project team. The mentoring support was highly appreciated by partners, as they benefited from the expertise of the mentors in improving the credibility of their research results and quality of the research outputs. Besides the mentoring, SUMERNET supported several workshops to enhance their capacity to generate outputs specifically intended for the academic and specific-interest audience, such as journal articles and book chapters, and working papers. The success of the capacity building support for researchers was illustrated by generation of numerous peer-review publication outputs, on various stages manuscript to accepted, and also a high-quality of book chapters produced for the SUMERNET flagship book publication expected to be published in early 2014.

Supporting and sustaining high quality research remains the key effort in SUMERNET Phase II. From the wide vista of sustainable development challenges in the region, four research areas have been identified as the strategic research themes for Phase II:

- Ecosystem services, resource use and impacts, including: (a) conservation of critical ecosystems, (b) environmental sustainability, (c) biodiversity corridors, and (d) economic corridor sustainability.
- Trans-boundary issues. The focus is on the analysis of long-term impacts of national economics including trade and natural resources use on the sustainability of the region, and on searching for sustainable paths for regional cooperation and development.
- Energy & climate change: energy security, climate change and linkages of the two with economic development. The research under this theme directly aims at this target to support the formulation or development of national strategies in this area.
- Poverty and livelihoods: This theme is linked with the other three themes described above and will be a thread that runs through all aspects of Sumernet research activities.

These themes are themselves broad in character: they will be refined, prioritised and turned into specific research questions by the network members and in consultation with policy makers to understand what knowledge they need and how decisions on key sustainable development issues can be informed and influenced by better understanding of the immediate and long-term implications of key environmental and development trends in the region.

From those themes, 10 the research projects emerged within SUMERNET Phase II:

1. Vulnerability assessment of livelihoods in Lower Mekong Basin: Adaptation options for enhancing capacity of people living in the most vulnerable flood-prone areas in Cambodia and Vietnam
2. Making economic integration work for the rural poor through contract farming practices
3. Evaluation of Pilot Program on Payment for Forest Environmental Services in Vietnam and Policy Implication for Laos and Cambodia
4. Trans-boundary Fish Trade in the Lower Mekong Basin: Impacts on Fisheries and Rural Employment in Cambodia, Lao PDR and Thailand
5. Impact of Urban Expansion on the Hinterland and Local Responses in the Mekong Region: A Study in Khon Kaen, Thailand, and Vang Vieng, Lao PDR
6. Research on Integrating Community-based Participatory Carbon Measurement and Monitoring with Satellite Remote Sensing and GIS in a Measurement, Reporting and Verification (MRV) System for Reducing Emission from Deforestation and Forest Degradation-Plus (REDD+) and Agroforestry Carbon Sequestration Activities
7. Communicating water-related climate change risks to improve local adaptation in the deltas of the Mekong Region
8. Climate change implications to food security and livelihood of small-scale farmers
9. Sustainable urban tourism through low carbon initiatives: Experiences from Hue and Chiang Mai
10. Participatory Social Return on Investment (PSROI): Greater Mekong Basin Climate Change Adaptation Planning and Costing Project

These research projects are co-supported by the Swedish International Development Cooperation Agency (Sida) and the Climate and Development Knowledge Network (CDKN).

=== Phase III (2014–2017) ===
Following its first two implementation phases, SUMERNET expanded its regional research network across various sustainability policy areas. Operating as a collaboration among 50 research and policy-making institutions, Phase III focused on informing policy-making in the Mekong Region regarding socially inclusive and gender-responsive sustainable development.

In response to shifting knowledge demands and policy debates in the region, SUMERNET Phase III focused its work on three key issues:

- Climate-compatible development. The rising energy demand and rapid urbanization that have typically accompanied economic growth in Southeast Asia represent significant challenges and opportunities for climate-compatible development. SUMERNET research is promoting human development while addressing both mitigation of, and adaptation to, climate change.
- Regional economic integration. Greater regional economic integration has been promoted widely in the region, most notably as part of the Greater Mekong Subregion (GMS) activities leading to increased transborder trade and investment activities. But poverty and inequality as well as transboundary environmental degradation need pressing attention.
- Ecosystem services and local development. Local development in rural and peri-urban settings is often greatly affected by the condition of ecosystems and the services they provide. Research and policy-oriented assessments are needed to help maintain and improve ecosystem services throughout the Mekong region to ensure the well-being of societies and households who derive their livelihoods from natural resources.

SUMERNET Phase III was supported by Swedish International Development Agency (Sida).

=== SUMERNET 4 All (2018-2024) ===
SUMERNET 4 All aimed to reduce water insecurity in the Mekong Region, principally for vulnerable populations. By conducting collaborative research, engaging with the policy process, and promoting scientifically sound research and innovation while considering gender, social equity and human rights, the programme aimed to improve water management policies and practices.

The supported research projects under this phase were categorized into three themes:

1. Water access, rights & allocation in times of scarcity;
2. Governance and management of flood disaster risks; and,
3. Transboundary interactions with water systems.

In this phase, SUMERNET supported 230 individual grantees through more than 40 grants funded under three focused themes: Water access, rights and allocation in times of scarcity; Governance and management of flood disaster risks; and Transboundary interactions with water systems. To further enhance the engagement of young professionals in the region, SUMERNET Young Professional (SYP) network has been initiated as part of the SUMERNET network through a bottom-up approach led by young researchers from six countries. Despite the impact of the COVID-19 pandemic, SUMERNET could continue to implement its work programme, which is a credit to its dedicated regional constituents and all network members and supporters.

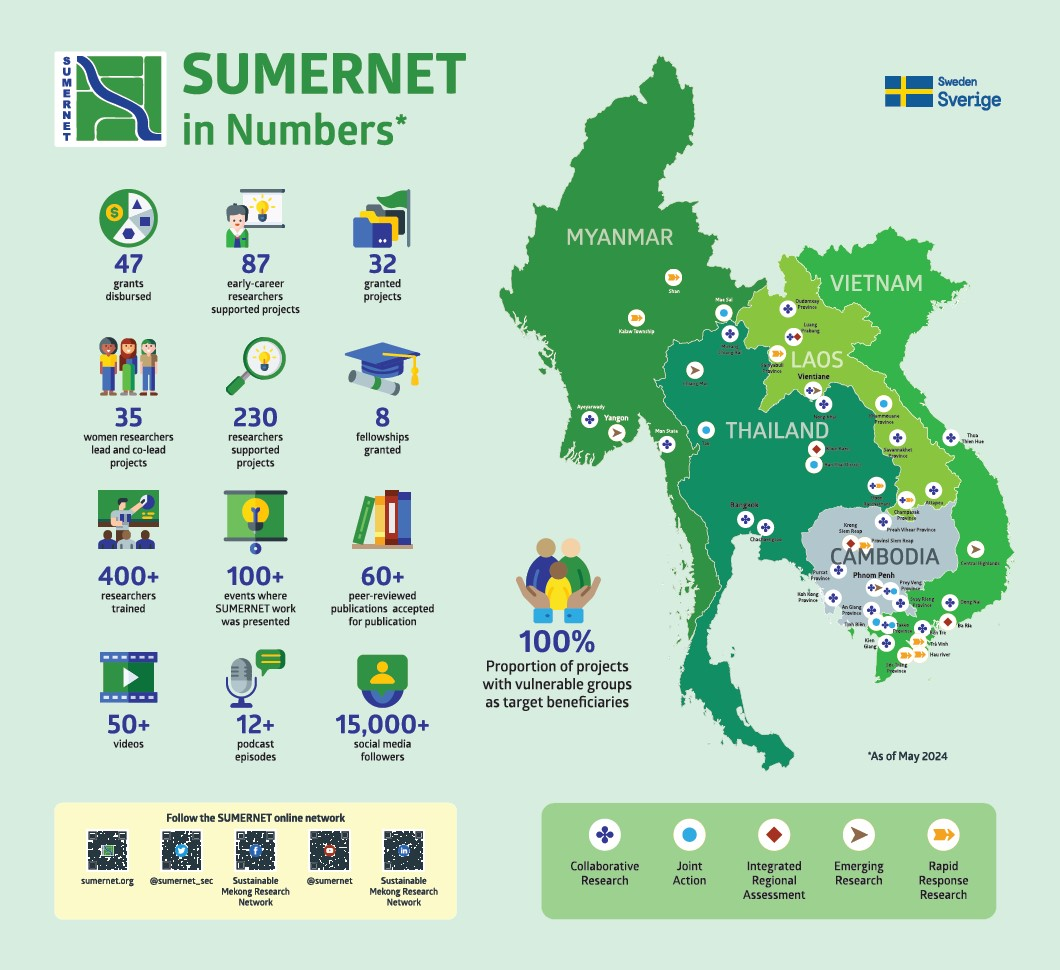
SUMERNET by Numbers: the results of SUMERNET activities under SUMERNET 4 All (2018–2024). This includes a map of the Mekong where the project sites are located.
