= Mekong Institute =

- Abbreviation: MI
- Formation: 1996
- Type: IGO
- Location: Khon Kaen, Thailand
- Members: Cambodia, China, Laos, Myanmar, Thailand, Vietnam
- Website: www.mekonginstitute.org

Mekong Institute (MI) is an intergovernmental organization (IGO) run by six governments in the Greater Mekong Sub-region (GMS): Cambodia, Laos, Myanmar, Thailand, Vietnam, and the Yunnan Province and Guangxi Zhuang Autonomous Region of China. MI delivers various programs and activities focusing on human resource development and capacity building for regional cooperation and integration.

== History ==
Mekong Institute (MI) began implementing training programs in 1996 after Thailand signed a Memorandum of Understanding (MoU) with New Zealand.

Initially, MI mainly conducted training activities for middle-senior level government officials in the Greater Mekong Sub-region (GMS) to assist them in moving towards a market economy. In 2003, with the creation and signing of the MI Charter, MI evolved into a non-profit autonomous organization. Since then, it has focused more on rural development, good governance, and trade and investment facilitation.

In 2009, after further development, the Bill for the Protection of the Operation of Mekong Institute was signed and a royal decree was issued by H.M. the King of Thailand. MI was thereby declared and acknowledged as an intergovernmental organization (IGO) providing human resource development programs as well as other capacity development learning programs.

As of 2015, MI has over 6000 alumni and accomplished over 80 research projects related to the development of the sub-region with the support of more than 40 national and international development and implementing partners. After more than 18 years of service, MI continues to take on multi-sector programs in collaboration with various partners, both in public and private sectors, to deliver effective programs.

== Programs ==
=== Agricultural Development and Commercialization (ADC) ===
The Agricultural Development and Commercialization (ADC) concentrates on improving agricultural productivity and profitability. The program also provides knowledge and skills to facilitate linkages in agricultural development and commercialization to all relevant actors with the knowledge and skills needed to enhance agriculture production and marketing in the regional context.

=== Trade and Investment Facilitation (TIF) ===
Trade and Investment Facilitation (TIF) concentrates on establishing capacity and a supportive environment for Small and Medium-sized Enterprises (SMEs) to address entire value chains through engaging with business associations, chamber of commerce and governmental agencies involved in trade and SME development in the GMS countries.

=== Innovation and Technological Connectivity (ITC) ===
Innovation and Technological Connectivity (ITC) responds to the emergence and application of innovation and technological connectivity by developing initiatives to address issues in the GMS countries.

== Special Projects ==
=== Capacity Development for More Inclusive and Equitable Growth in the Greater Mekong Sub-region: East-West Economic Corridor (EWEC) ===
EWEC, funded by the Swiss Agency for Development and Cooperation (SDC), facilitates and provides capacity development programs to farmers, SMEs, government agencies, and business development service providers involved in agricultural value chains. The aim of the project is to further develop economic growth in the corridor.

== Residential Training Center ==
Mekong Institute Residential Training Center is situated inside Khon Kaen University and includes the following training facilities:

- Three conference rooms
- GMS Resource Center
- Thirty-five standard hotel rooms (with 24-hour internet access)
- Two-storey annex with a VIP reception room

== See also ==
- Khon Kaen
- Greater Mekong Sub-region
