= Njoro River =

Stream flowing into Lake Nakuru, Kenya

Njoro is a third order stream flowing into Lake Nakuru, Kenya. Its source is in the Mau Forest. It is also known as Ndarugu River.

Efforts are being made to address the significant (faecal) water pollution problems of the river, especially in the upper reaches. Some of these address the subsistence farmer's perceptions and techniques.
