= Ecological Sanitation Research Programme =

- EcoSanRes logo
- Abbreviation: EcoSanRes
- Formation: 2001
- Type: Non-profit
- Purpose: Sustainable sanitation
- Headquarters: Stockholm, Sweden
- Region served: International
- Official language: English
- Parent organization: Stockholm Environment Institute
- Staff: 12
- Website: http://www.ecosanres.org/

The Ecological Sanitation Research Programme (EcoSanRes) is a research and capacity development program that aims to develop and promote sustainable sanitation in the developing world through capacity development and knowledge management as a contribution to equity, health, poverty alleviation, and improved environmental quality.

EcoSanRes was funded by the Swedish International Development Cooperation Agency (Sida) from 2001-2010. It was hosted by the Stockholm Environment Institute which is a partner of the Sustainable Sanitation Alliance.

== See also ==
- sanitation
- ecological sanitation
- sustainable sanitation
