= GMS Environment Operations Center =

Greater Mekong Subregion (GMS) Environment Operations Center (EOC) was established in early 2006 to serve as the information and knowledge clearing house for environmental management in the Greater Mekong Subregion (GMS) and is responsible for facilitating the timely and effective implementation of the GMS Core Environment Program (CEP). EOC will also act as a secretariatto the Working Group on Environment (WGE), taking over the support functions, such as organizing and holding WGE meetings, coordinating WGE activities, reporting to the WGE, and other tasks which were previously carried out by the Asian Development Bank (ADB).

== Components ==
The GMS Core Environment Program (CEP) has 5 components:

- Component 1. Strategic Environmental Assessments (SEAs) of GMS Economic Corridors and Priority Sectors
- Component 2. Biodiversity Conservation Corridors Initiative (BCI)
- Component 3. Environmental Performance Assessments (EPAs)
- Component 4. Capacity Building for Environmental Management
- Component 5. Program Development, Delivery and Sustainable Financing
