= Shompole Conservancy =

Nature conservation area

- Location within Kenya
- Location: Rift Valley Province, Kenya
- Nearest city: Nairobi
- Coordinates: 2°01′19″S 36°02′45″E
- Area: 35,000 acres (14,000 ha)

The Shompole Conservancy is a large privately operated conservation area in the south of the Great Rift Valley, Kenya. It is located between Lake Magadi to the north and Lake Natron to the south, two alkaline lakes.

The conservancy is in the Magadi division. The lodge is at the end of the Ngurumani escarpment, about 5 kilometres (3.1 mi) from Lake Natron on the border between Kenya and Tanzania. The conservancy covers part of the 62,700 hectares (155,000 acres) Shompole group ranch, registered in 1979 and owned by the Loodokilani Maasai with over 2000 registered members. The lodge was closed in September 2011 while the owners discussed its future and that of the conservancy with the local Maasai community.

The conservancy has a dry climate, hottest in October and November and most likely to be wet in April and May. Flora is adapted to semi-arid conditions and include umbrella thorn trees and the colorful toothbrush tree. The main source of water is the Ewaso Ng'iro (Brown River) which originates in the Mau forest to the north and flows into Lake Natron. There are riverine thickets along the banks of the river. Wildlife includes giraffes, buffalos, elephants, and desert antelopes such as gerenuks and oryx.

== Sources ==
- Msambweni (28 April 2009). "Journey through Shompole conservancy".
- "Shompole Lodge - Closed Until Further Notice". Porini.
- South Rift Association of Land Owners. "Shompole Conservancy".
