= Corinne Kratz =

American anthropologist and Africanist

Corinne Ann Kratz is an American anthropologist and Africanist known for her extensive fieldwork with Okiek communities in Kenya and her work in museum studies. Her research spans performance and ritual, museums and exhibitions, visual and verbal media and communication, and the politics of cultural representation. She is Distinguished Professor Emerita of Anthropology and African Studies at Emory University and has published widely on culture and communication, visual anthropology, museum studies, performance studies, semiotics, and public scholarship.

== Education ==
Kratz received her B.A. summa cum laude in Anthropology and Religion from Wesleyan University in 1977, graduating simultaneously with an M.A. in Anthropology. She earned her Ph.D. in Anthropology from the University of Texas at Austin in 1988, with a dissertation titled Emotional Power and Significant Movement: Womanly Transformation in Okiek Initiation.

== Career ==
During the 1980s, Kratz conducted ethnographic research with the Okiek people in Kenya, returning to the communities where she had already done research in 1974-75. Following her Ph.D., she returned to Kenya for several more years for continued research and to develop a photographic exhibition. From 1990 to 1992, she held postdoctoral fellowships in the United States and subsequently returned to Kenya under additional research grants until 1994.

In 1993, Kratz joined Emory University, where she held faculty roles in Anthropology and African Studies. She co-directed the Center for the Study of Public Scholarship and led programs such as the Institutions of Public Culture program, a Rockefeller-funded initiative in collaboration with South African partners. She also co-founded the Grant Writing Program for graduate students in the humanities and social sciences, serving as co-director and later as sole director (2002–2022). In 2012, she co-founded the African Critical Inquiry Program, a partnership which supports both dissertation research by African doctoral students and an annual workshop in South Africa and has served as its Emory director since its inception.

Her research integrates linguistic anthropology, semiotics, and visual culture studies, developing multimodal frameworks for analyzing culture and communication, including analyses of ritual efficacy and exhibition design. Her long-term fieldwork has documented and analyzed Okiek ceremonies, history, ethnic identity, marriage arrangement, and verbal art, yielding a substantial body of Okiek-language recordings. She continues to work with the community through the Okiek People’s Development Program, supporting education initiatives.

Kratz has also conducted comparative research on cultural exhibitions in museums and other settings and led a project on kente cloth and African American identity in Atlanta. She has held affiliations with institutions such as the Smithsonian Institution, the Pitt Rivers Museum at Oxford, the University of Nairobi, and the Museum of International Folk Art in Santa Fe.

She collaborated extensively with her husband, social anthropologist and museum studies scholar Ivan Karp.

== Research and publications ==
Kratz’s work spans ethnography, semiotics, visual anthropology, research methods, and museum studies. Her major publications include:

- Rhetorics of Value: Exhibition Design and Communication in Museums and Beyond (2025)
- The Ones That Are Wanted: Communication and the Politics of Representation in a Photographic Exhibition (2002)
- Museum Frictions: Public Cultures/Global Transformations (2006, co-editor)
- Affecting Performance: Meaning, Movement, and Experience in Okiek Women's Initiation (1994; reissued 2010)

Her scholarly articles include:

- “The Porcupine of Time” (2026)
- “Kinship in Action, Kinship in Flux” (2019)
- “Where Did You Cry?” (2018)
- “The Case of the Recurring Wodaabe” (2018)
- “The Interrogative Museum” (2015, with Ivan Karp)
- “Ceremonies, Sitting Rooms, and Albums” (2012)
- "Rhetorics of Value" (2011)
- “In and Out of Focus” (2010)
- “Persistent Popular Images of Pastoralists” (2002, with Robert J. Gordon)
- “Gender, Ethnicity, and Social Aesthetics in Maasai and Okiek Beadwork” (2000, with Donna Pido)
- “Wonder and Worth: Disney Museums in World Showcase” (1993, with Ivan Karp)
- “We’ve Always Done It Like This… Except for a Few Details” (1993)
- “Amusement and Absolution” (1991)
- “Persuasive Suggestions and Reassuring Promises” (1990)
- “Are the Okiek Really Masai? or Kipsigis? or Kikuyu?” (1981)

Kratz’s multilingual photography-based exhibition, Okiek Portraits, toured internationally, including at the Smithsonian Institution and the Nairobi National Museum. She has also co-edited special thematic issues of Visual Anthropology, Anthropology Southern Africa, and the Journal of African Cinemas.

== Awards and honors ==
- Lifetime Service Award, Council for Museum Anthropology (2021)
- Emory University Emeritus College Distinguished Faculty Award (2019)
- John Collier Jr. Award for Still Photography (2003)
- Guggenheim Fellowship (1996–1997)
- Grants and fellowships from NEH, NSF, SSRC, Wenner-Gren Foundation, Fulbright Program, and Rockefeller Foundation

She has held visiting fellowships at institutions including the Harry S. Truman Institute, the Bogliasco Study Center, and the School of American Research.

== Professional service ==
Kratz has served on the executive board of the American Anthropological Association, the African Studies Association, and the Council for Museum Anthropology, and has participated in numerous editorial and advisory committees related to museums, African studies, and public scholarship. She has also served on nominating and selection committees, including for the Carnegie Scholars Program, Fulbright Program, and the Santa Fe International Folk Art Market.

== Selected exhibitions ==
- Okiek Portraits (1989–1998), exhibited in Kenya and six U.S. venues
- Wrapped in Pride: Ghanaian Kente and African American Identity (2002), Michael C. Carlos Museum, Emory University (Emory curator for traveling exhibition)
