= Greater Mekong Subregion =

Trans-national region of the Mekong River in Southeast Asia

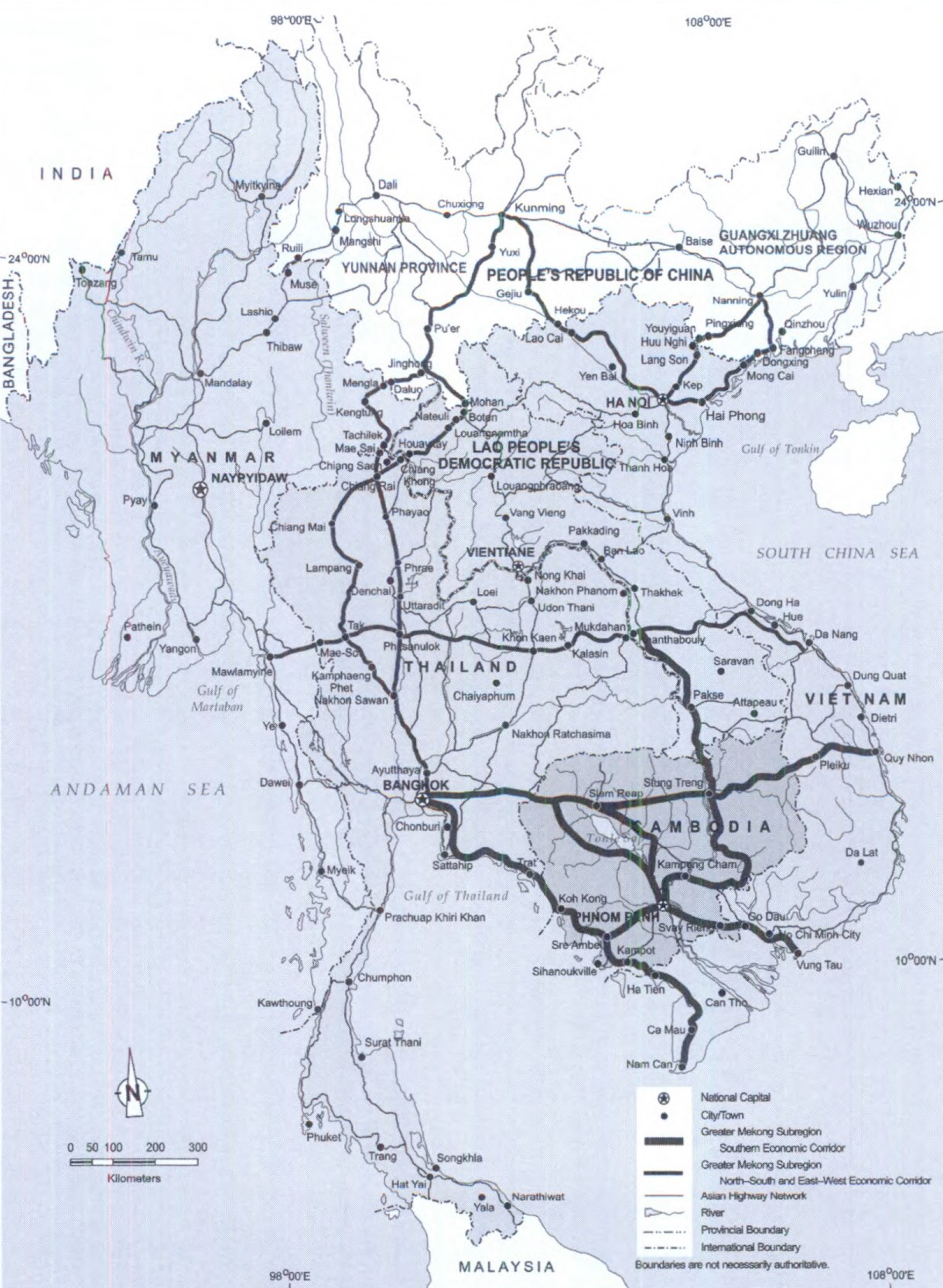
Economic corridors of the Greater Mekong Subregion

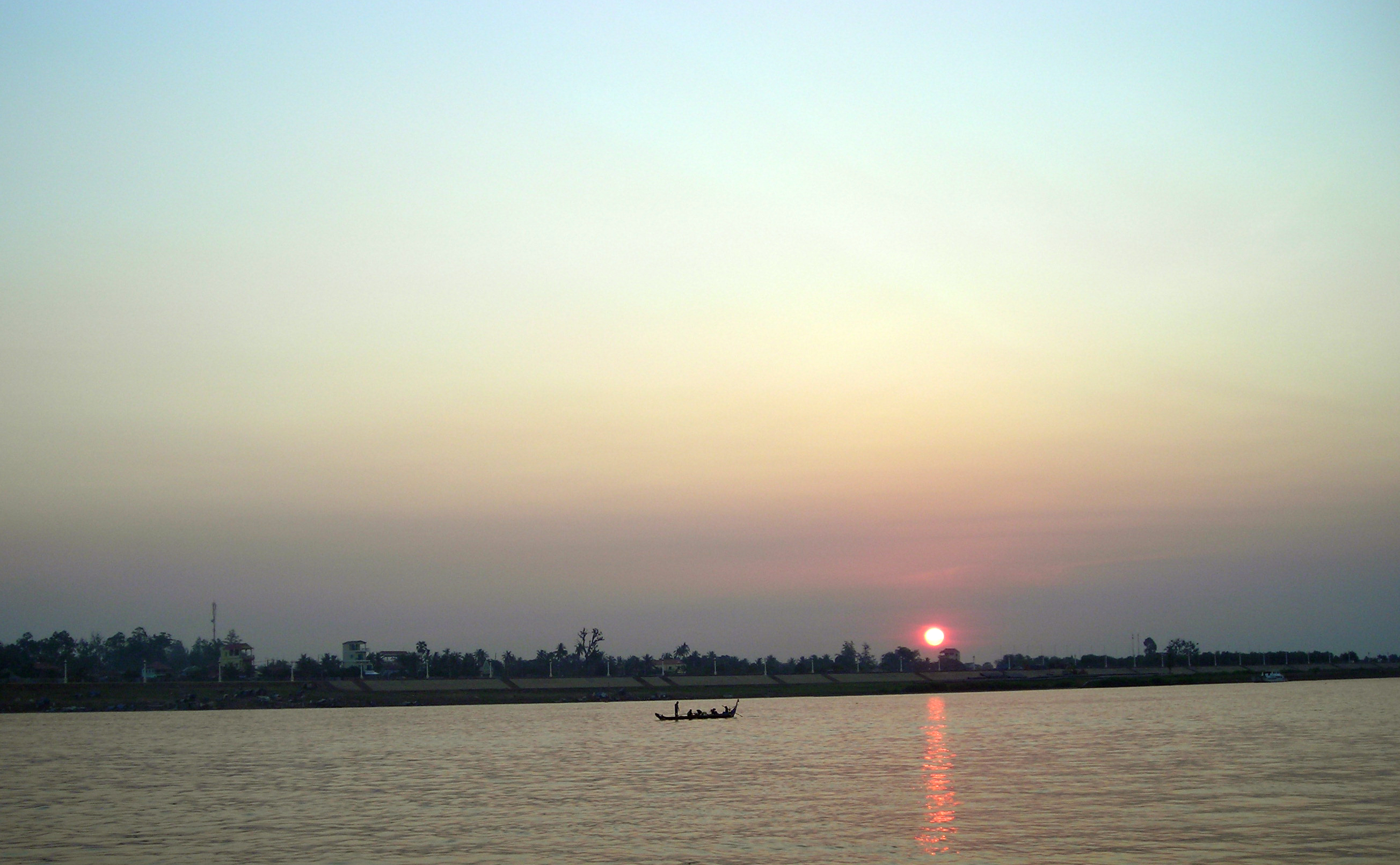
Mekong River sunrise, Phnom Penh, Cambodia

The Greater Mekong Subregion, (GMS) or just Greater Mekong, is a trans-national region of the Mekong River basin in Southeast Asia. The region is home to more than 300 million people. It came into being with the launch of a development program in 1992 by the Asian Development Bank that brought together the six Asian countries of Cambodia, China (specifically Yunnan and Guangxi), Laos, Myanmar, Thailand, and Vietnam.

The Greater Mekong Subregion holds irreplaceable natural and cultural riches and is considered one of the world's most significant biodiversity hotspots. The region is an important food provider and the site of many large-scale construction projects with social and economic implications.

== Regional cooperation ==
For more than two decades, the six countries of the Greater Mekong Subregion have been working together under an economic cooperation program to realize their vision of a prosperous, integrated, and harmonious subregion.

The GMS Program has adopted a three-pronged strategy (the three Cs):

1. Strengthening connectivity through physical infrastructure and the development of economic corridors.
2. Improving competitiveness through market integration and the facilitation of cross-border trade and travel.
3. Building a sense of community by addressing shared social and environmental concerns.

The GMS Program, with the support of development partners, helps identify and implement high-priority subregional projects in a wide range of sectors: agriculture, energy, environment, health and human resource development, information and communication technology, tourism, transport, transport and trade facilitation, and urban development. More than US$20 billion in investments have been directly channeled through the program.

Since 1998, the GMS program has been using economic corridors to promote economic growth and development. Economic corridors are investment areas, usually running along major highways, which connect centers of economic activity. Three main economic corridors are being developed in the Greater Mekong Subregion: the North-South Economic Corridor, the Southern Economic Corridor, and the East-West Economic Corridor.

In September 2017, the 22nd Ministerial Conference in Hanoi, Vietnam endorsed the medium-term pipeline of priority projects from 2018 to 2022. The rolling pipeline includes more than 200 investment and technical assistance projects, which will require more than US$80 billion in financing.

On 31 March 2018, the Sixth GMS Summit of Leaders in Hanoi adopted the Hanoi Action Plan and the Regional Investment Framework 2022.

== Landscape and biodiversity ==
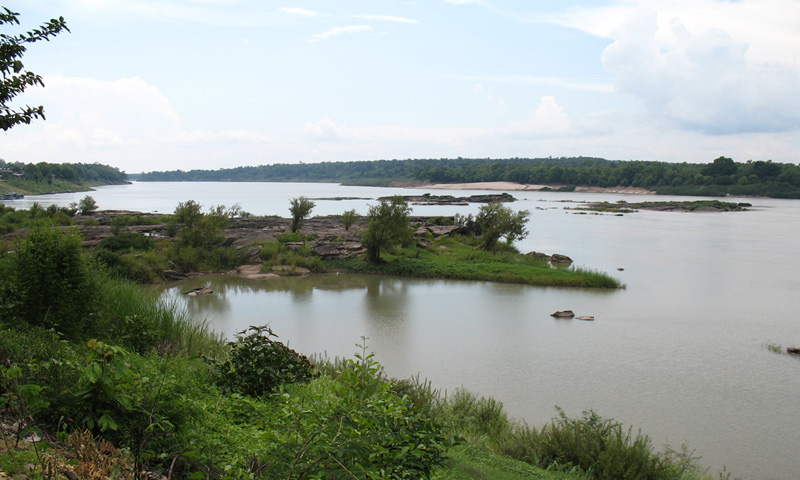
The Mekong River, Ubon Ratchathani Province, Thailand (more images)

The region has a diverse landscape including massifs, plateaus, and limestone karsts, lowlands, floodplains and deltas, forests (evergreen and semi-evergreen, deciduous, dipterocarp, mangroves, and swamp), and grasslands. Water environments include fast-flowing mountain streams and wetlands such as Tonlé Sap in Cambodia.

The region's geographic variety and consequent variety of climatic zones supports significant biodiversity, with more than a thousand new species discovered in the first decade of the 2000s. The geographic region encapsulates 16 of the World Wide Fund for Nature's (WWF) Global 200 ecoregions, and habitats for an estimated 20,000 plant species, 1,300 fish species, 1,200 bird species, 800 reptile and amphibian species, and 430 mammalian species (according to WWF, 44 of these are primates, 19 of which are endemic). Notable species include the Javan rhino, Irrawaddy dolphins, and Mekong giant catfish, one of the largest extant freshwater fish. The WWF reported that in 2016, 115 new species were discovered in the region, including three mammals, two fish, 11 reptiles, 11 amphibians, and 88 plants. This brings the total number of newly discovered species in the Greater Mekong Subregion from 1997 to 2016 to 2,524.

The region's biodiversity is ranked as a top-five most threatened hotspot by Conservation International. The WWF cites accelerating economic development, population growth, and increased consumption patterns as primary causes, including agricultural deforestation, logging and illegal timber trade, wildlife trade, overfishing, dam and road construction, and mining. The WWF also states that the region is particularly vulnerable to global climate change.

=== Conservation ===
With the rapid development in the region, conservation efforts to protect natural resources, habitats, biodiversity and local cultures in the Greater Mekong have become urgent. The most pressing current threats are hydropower development, climate change, illegal wildlife trade, and habitat loss.

== Environmental threats ==
The harvesting and production of natural resources in the Greater Mekong Subregion is of significant economic importance, with the retail value of Mekong river fisheries alone estimated at more than US$4 billion annually.

The Greater Mekong Subregion has become the site of large-scale construction projects and rapid economic development, including hydropower dams, mining, forestry, and industrial production. These factors have raised environmental concerns internationally since the mid-2000s. For now, it has resulted in formulation of environmental programs and strategy proposals and strategy developments of a sustainable green growth economy for this region. It has been attained by influential organizations like the United Nations (UNEP and FAO), WWF, PROFOR and others, in high-level collaboration with the governmental ministries of the countries comprising the Greater Mekong Subregion.

Solar and wind energy offer solutions to the environmental and social challenges posed by coal power and hydropower projects. The Mekong countries have substantial potential for solar and wind power. With the support of off-river pumped hydro energy storage, solar and wind power emerge as promising and sustainable alternatives for meeting the energy needs of the Mekong region.

=== Deforestation ===
In the 1970s, the Greater Mekong Subregion was one of the world's most densely forested areas. However, deforestation has reduced its forests by a third and is on a trajectory to lose another third by 2030. The highest rates of deforestation in the GMS are found in Cambodia, Laos, Thailand, Vietnam, and Myanmar.

Deforestation in the GMS has many causes, including the expansion of unsustainable rubber and palm oil plantations, dam development, infrastructure development, illegal and unsustainable logging, forest fires, and natural resource exploitation. In effect, deforestation has impacted the environment, biodiversity, and inhabitants of the region. The increased pollution due to run-off has made the water of the Mekong unhealthy for the fish and for human consumption, while riverbanks have become more susceptible to the pressures of climate change and flash flooding because of missing protection tree roots provide. The loss of flooded forests has also impacted the aquatic food chain, putting further pressures on the fishing industry and the 40 million people who take part in fishing-related activities in the GMS.

The GMS is a hotspot for vector-borne diseases along its watershed, including malaria, but environmental changes such as deforestation have begun to change this reality. A study that compared malaria rates in the northern and southern regions of Laos found that deforestation increases malaria rates in the short term (1–3 years), but lessens them dramatically in the long term.

Deforestation in the GMS has the potential to become irreversible unless actions are taken and policy is implemented. Local community-supported initiatives, such as the many Community Protected Areas (CPAs) in Cambodia's Phnom Kulen National Park, have been established to stop illegal logging and poaching.

== Organizations ==
Organizations involved in the Greater Mekong Subregion include:

- Mekong River Commission (MRC)
- Asian Development Bank (ADB)
- Greater Mekong Subregion Academic and Research Network (GMSARN)
- Sustainable Mekong Research Network (SUMERNET)
- United Nations
  - Food and Agriculture Organization of the United Nations (FAO)
  - United Nations Environment Programme (UNEP)
  - United Nations Office on Drugs and Crime (UNODC)
- World Wide Fund for Nature (WWF)
- Programme on Forests (PROFOR)
- Open Development Mekong, founded by the EastWest Institute
- The Mekong Order
- Lancang-Mekong River Integrated Law Enforcement and Security Cooperation Center (LMLECC)

== See also ==
- Asian Development Bank
- GMS Environment Operations Center
- Indochina
- Mekong Delta
- Mekong Institute
- Mekong River
- Subregion
- Mekong–Ganga Cooperation
