= Ol Lalunga =

- Country: Kenya
- County: Narok County
- Time zone: UTC+3 (EAT)

Ol Lalunga is a settlement in Kenya's Narok County.

== Notable residents ==
- Naiyan Kiplagat, environmental activist.
