= Swedish International Agricultural Network Initiative =

Swedish agriculture

The Swedish International Agricultural Network Initiative (SIANI) is a network-based communications platform which works to bring food security and agricultural development. It operates in line with 2030 Agenda, under the vision of “Ending hunger, achieving food security, improving nutrition and promoting sustainable agriculture”. SIANI's mission is to facilitate inclusive and engaging dialogues around Sustainable Development Goal #2, with participation from academia, the private sector, public authorities and civil society.

SIANI seeks to generate impact by:

- creating opportunities for evidence-based, gender-balanced dialogues
- making knowledge available for informed decision-making in local, national and international arenas, and
- facilitating cross-sector, multi-stakeholder, joint action.

Launched in 2009, with core funding from the Swedish International Development Cooperation Agency and hosted by the Stockholm Environment Institute (SEI), SIANI provides an open, interactive and neutral platform for multi-sector engagement and dialogue. SIANI seeks to improve sustainability and gender equality, but does not take any ideological stance and does not lobby for any particular farming method or practice. Individual members may their opinions through SIANI activities and media. SIANI strives for gender balance and multi-stakeholder representation in its operation and activities.

== History ==
SIANI work was initiated at the consultative workshop in 2008, where a wide range of stakeholders discussed a noted lack of attention given to agriculture's role in sustainable development, both within Sweden and internationally. It was argued that a lot of agricultural expertise existed amongst the Swedish resource base, but that this expertise was not used to its full potential.

This led to the launch of SIANI in 2010, with the goal of establishing a platform for cross-sectoral knowledge exchange about agriculture, food and rural development. Since then, SIANI has been working on awareness raising and knowledge production and exchange about the critical role of agriculture for sustainable development.

Since then SIANI has proceeded to other development phases: Phase 2 (2013-2016) was centered on network expansion and consolidation. That is when the SIANI platform anchored its position as a facilitator of choice for anyone who works with and is interested in sustainable agriculture, food security and nutrition, particularly in low-income countries.

In the spring of 2016, an external evaluation concluded that the SIANI network should no longer be seen as an initiative, but rather as a long-term investment aimed at tackling issues of poverty reduction, food security and sustainable agricultural development. In January 2016, SIANI entered phase 3 (2016-2020). To better reflect the 2030 Agenda it was determined that SIANI will focus and orient its actions on SDG2: Zero Hunger.

== Governing body ==
=== Steering Committee ===
The SIANI Steering Committee is responsible for the strategic development of the SIANI network, making the major decisions concerning SIANI's general objectives, planning and program, and on issues of major importance regarding the organization, finances, administration and information activities.

The SIANI board is made up of a minimum of five and a maximum of ten members who must collectively comprise a broad and varied experience and expertise in aspects of international agricultural development. The Swedish Development Cooperation Agency (Sida), the Stockholm Environment Institute (SEI) and the Swedish University of Agricultural Sciences (SLU) are permanent members and can participate in debates, comment, and ask questions, but have no right to vote when decisions are made, with the exception of cases where full consensus is required.

== Executive Body - The Secretariat ==
The responsibility for the day-to-day functioning and financial management of SIANI as well as developing, coordinating and stimulating the network is carried out by the SIANI Secretariat. The secretariat is hosted by the Headquarters of the Stockholm Environment Institute in Stockholm.

== Membership ==
SIANI membership is free and open to all interested individuals working on issues of agriculture and food security and registered via the SIANI website. SIANI's membership base is primarily academics from Sweden but is open to anyone, and members can be found in both of the Americas, Africa and Asia. There are also a number of members from civil society organizations, government agencies and the private sector. Members have an opportunity to contribute to the formation of the annual work plan through the annual members’ meeting.

== Impact ==
In collaboration with its partners, SIANI has built a robust body of work and the network has a broad global outreach. Among other things, supporting Swedish work on antimicrobial resistance, initiated a strategy for developing urban agroforestry work in Gothenburg, and helped to create the Agroforestry Network. SIANI raised the issue of food waste with its implications for global food chains, and highlighted that social protection systems have a greater impact if they are designed with a food and nutrition perspective in mind. The SIANI event about soils in Malmö created interest among government officials and led to a request for training of decision-makers in southern Sweden.
