= Stockholm Environment Institute =

Nonprofit, independent research and policy institute

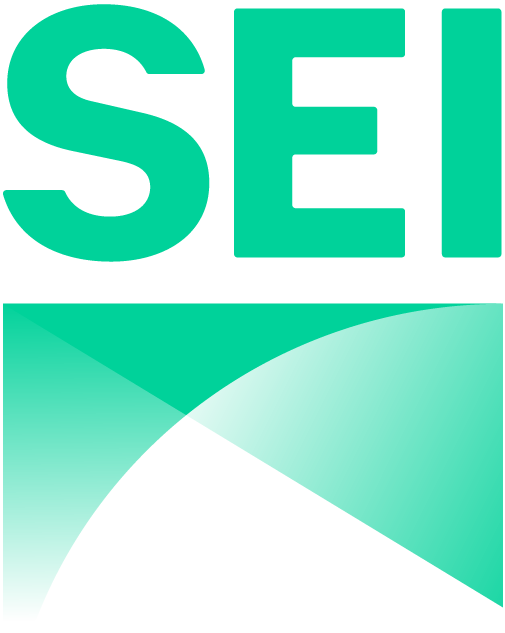
- bridging science, policy and practice
- Abbreviation: SEI
- Formation: 1 January 1989; 37 years ago
- Type: Foundation
- Purpose: International research and policy
- Headquarters: Stockholm, Sweden
- Location: Sweden, United Kingdom, United States, Estonia, Thailand, Kenya, Colombia
- Region served: International
- Official languages: English
- Executive Director: Eeva Primmer
- Main organ: Board of Directors
- Revenue: 468,000,000 SEK (Global) (2025)
- Staff: 381 (2025)
- Website: https://www.sei.org/

Stockholm Environment Institute, or SEI, is a non-profit, independent research and policy institute specialising in sustainable development and environmental issues, with seven affiliate offices around the world. SEI works on climate change, energy systems, water resources, air quality, land-use, sanitation, food security, and trade issues with the aim to shift policy and practice towards sustainability.

SEI wants to support decision-making and induce change towards sustainable development around the world by providing knowledge that bridges science and policy in the field of environment and development.

The institute's name derives from the Stockholm Declaration, adopted at the UN Conference on the Human Environment in Stockholm in 1972 — the first UN conference on the connections between human development and the environment — whose principles it was founded upon. These principles have since been reiterated and developed further in forums including the 1987 Brundtland Commission, the 1992 Rio Summit, and the 2015 articulation of the 2030 Agenda for Sustainable Development. SEI's strategy for the period 2025–2029, "Transitions in turbulent times", focuses on three main impact areas: climate transitions, nature and resources, and health and wellbeing.

== History ==
SEI was established in 1989 by the Swedish Parliament.

== Activities ==
=== Programs - Current and Past ===
- Ecological Sanitation Research Programme
- LEAP: Low Emissions Analysis Platform
- Regional Air Pollution In Developing Countries (RAPDIC)
- Resources and Energy Analysis Programme (REAP)
- SIANI Swedish International Agriculture Network Initiative (siani.se)
- Sustainable Mekong Research Network Programme (SUMERNET)
- TRASE Transparent supply chains for sustainable economies
- weADAPT
- WEAP: Water Evaluation And Planning System

=== Partnerships ===
- SEI was one of the organizations who founded the Sustainable Sanitation Alliance in 2007 together with the German Development Organization (GIZ)
- SEI collaborates closely with Stockholm University on research and education related to environment and development, including joint research applications and funding, guest lectures and seminars, postdoctoral mentoring, and reciprocal researcher affiliations. The agreement also allows Stockholm University researchers to be affiliated with SEI's offices in Estonia, Kenya, Thailand, the UK, and the US.

== Research ==
SEI researchers regularly take part in international research and policy collaborations. Two examples:

A study published in Science Advances in 2025, led by researchers at University College London (UCL) in collaboration with SEI, found that air pollution from oil and gas causes approximately 90,000 premature deaths in the United States each year, with disproportionate health impacts on communities of colour.

SEI has also supported Moldova's Ministry of Environment on a study of treated wastewater reuse in agriculture, launched in 2024 as part of the "Green Agenda" project for Armenia, Georgia, Moldova, and Ukraine, funded by the Swedish International Development Cooperation Agency (Sida). The study aims to support Moldova's alignment with EU Regulation 2020/741 on water reuse.

== Organizational structure ==
=== Board of Directors ===
SEI's board is international, with members appointed by the Government of Sweden. Under SEI's statutes, the Board is responsible for deciding the institute's long-term goals and strategy; ensuring proper management and control of finance, organization, and administration; appointing the Executive Director; and approving the annual budget of the SEI foundation. Two SEI employee representatives sit on the Board as non-voting members.

=== Board Chairs ===
The Chair of the Board is appointed by the Government of Sweden for a fixed term.

- 2004–2009 Lars Anell
- 2010–2021 Kerstin Niblaeus
- 2021–2022 Isabella Lövin
- 2023–present Lennart Båge

=== Executive Directors ===
- 1989–1990 Gordon T. Goodman
- 1991–1995 Michael J. Chadwick
- 1996–1999 Nicholas C. Sonntag
- 2000 Bert Bolin (interim Executive Director)
- 2000 Lars Nilsson (interim Executive Director)
- 2000–2004 Roger Kasperson
- 2004–2012 Johan Rockström
- 2012–2018 Johan L. Kuylenstierna
- 2018–2026 Måns Nilsson
- 2026-present Eeva Primmer

Måns Nilsson announced his plans to step down as Executive Director in September 2025. Eeva Primmer took over as Executive Director in May 2026, having previously served as Research Director at Finland's environment institute, SYKE.

=== Centres ===
SEI operates in seven countries: Sweden, United States, United Kingdom, Estonia, Thailand, Kenya, and Colombia.

== Funding sources ==
The Swedish International Development Cooperation Agency (Sida) is SEI's main donor. SEI also receives funding from development agencies, governments, NGOs, universities, businesses, and financial institutions.

For example, the Bill and Melinda Gates Foundation also provides funds to SEI in the area of maternal health and in sustainable sanitation. At the SEI Science Forum in 2015, Melinda Gates took part to discuss sustainability and gender together with SEI staff to help shape SEI's future research.
