= Southern Ewaso Ng'iro =

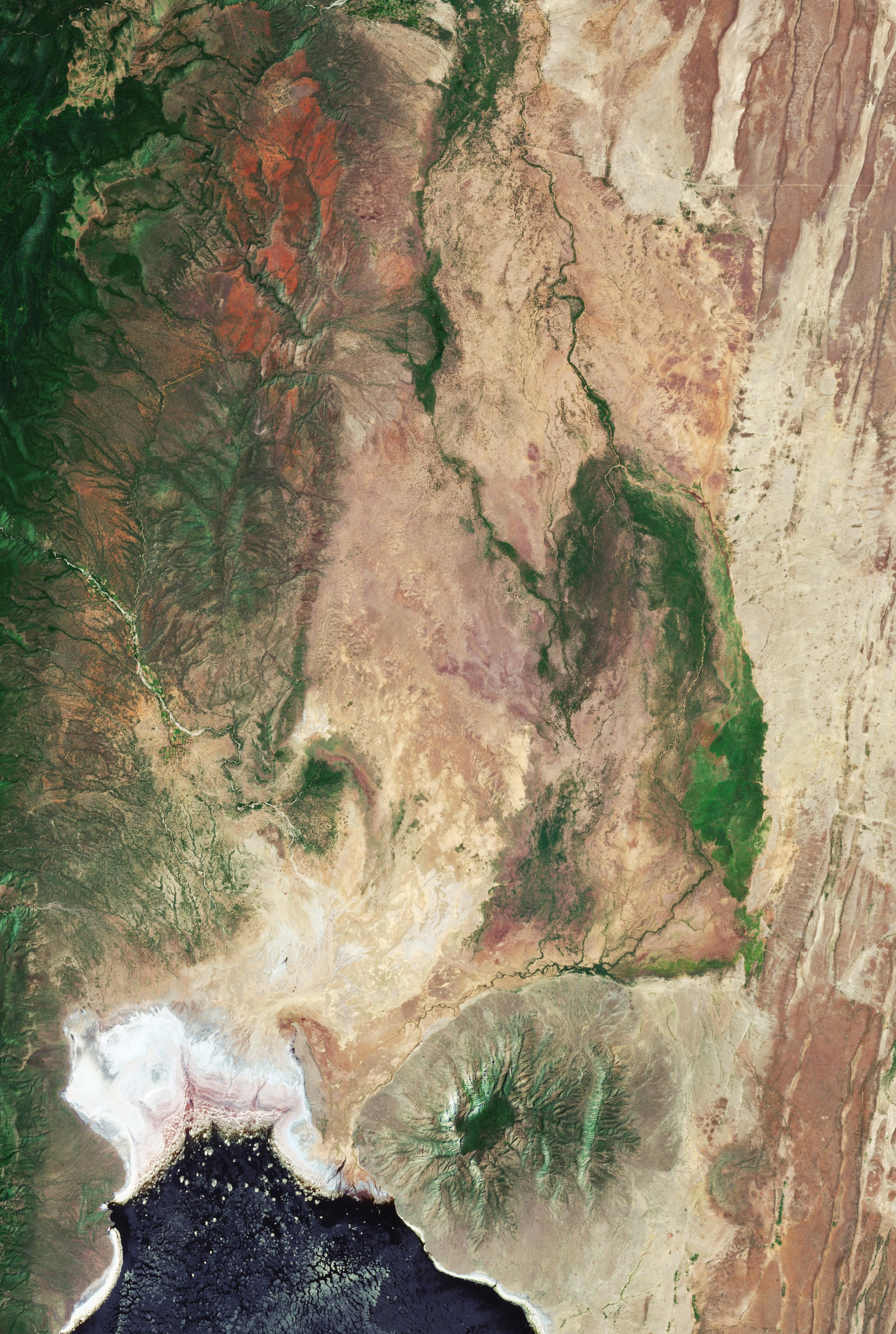
- Southern Ewaso Ng’iro from Kalema (Kenya) to its mouth into Lake Natron (Tanzania)

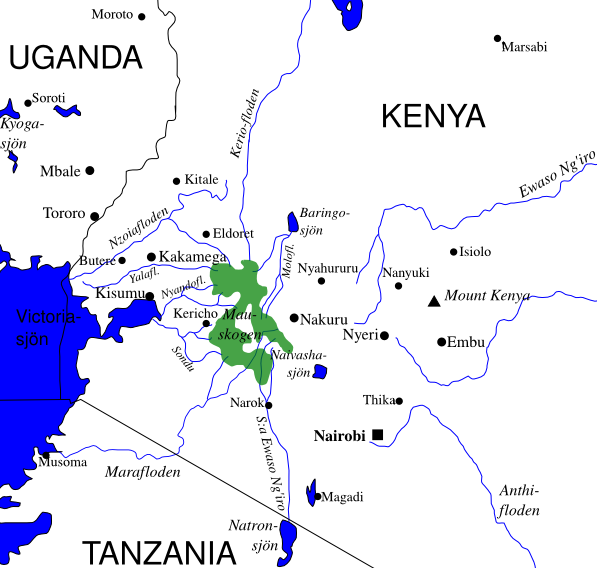
- Mau Forest (green) with Ewaso Ng'iro running south to Lake Natron at the foot of the map.

Location
- Country: Kenya

Physical characteristics
- Mouth
  - coordinates: 2.13691°S 36.05101°E
- Basin size: 7,600 square kilometres (2,900 sq mi)

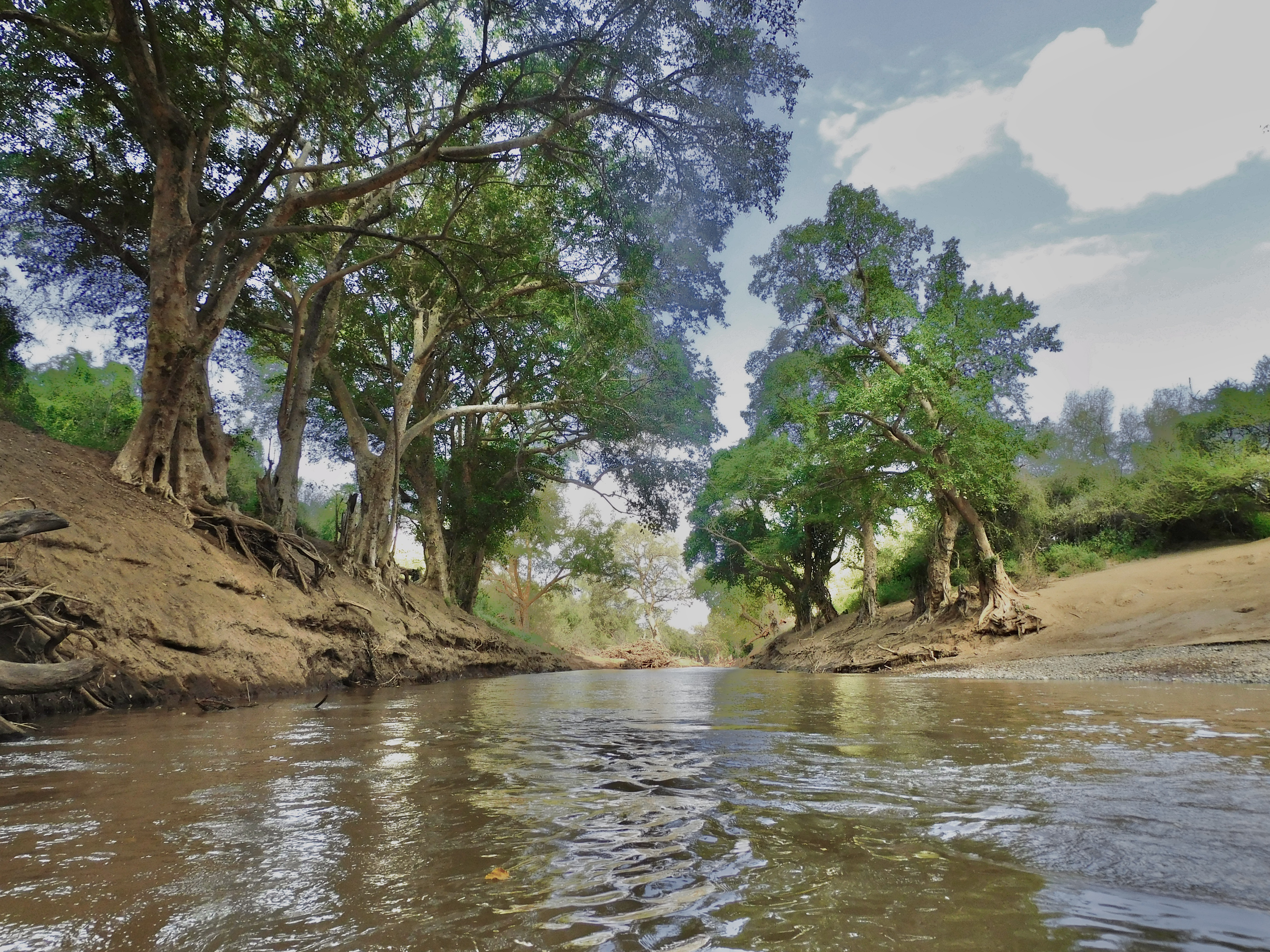
The River in Kenya's Shompole reserve.

The Southern Ewaso Ng'iro (Brown River) is a river in the Great Rift Valley in Kenya. It plays an important role in the ecology of Lake Natron, the main regular breeding site for near-threatened lesser flamingos. Changes to land use in the river's headwaters or in the marshes before the river enters the lake could have a serious impact on this species.

== Course ==
The Ewaso Ng'iro rises on the Mau Escarpment, where it drains the south part of the Mau Forest. The forest, which plays an important role in regulating and filtering the inflow to the river, is under threat from logging and land clearance for farming. Destruction would increase sediment loads in the river and cause greater seasonal variance in the volume of water. The river flows south through the rift valley to the east of the Nguruman Escarpment. It crosses the border into Tanzania, where it empties into Lake Natron. The river, which runs all year round, is the main inflow to the lake.

The river once flowed directly into the lake, but in geologically recent times it has been dammed by a horst beside the Shompole volcano. This has caused the waters to spread out into the steadily expanding Engare Ng'iro swamp, where the river deposits its sediment. The sediment-free river water then seeps into the brine lake. The permanent swamp covers about 4,000 hectares (9,900 acres). South of this a seasonal floodplain of about 8,000 hectares (20,000 acres) stretches down to Lake Natron and along its eastern shore.

== Possible changes ==
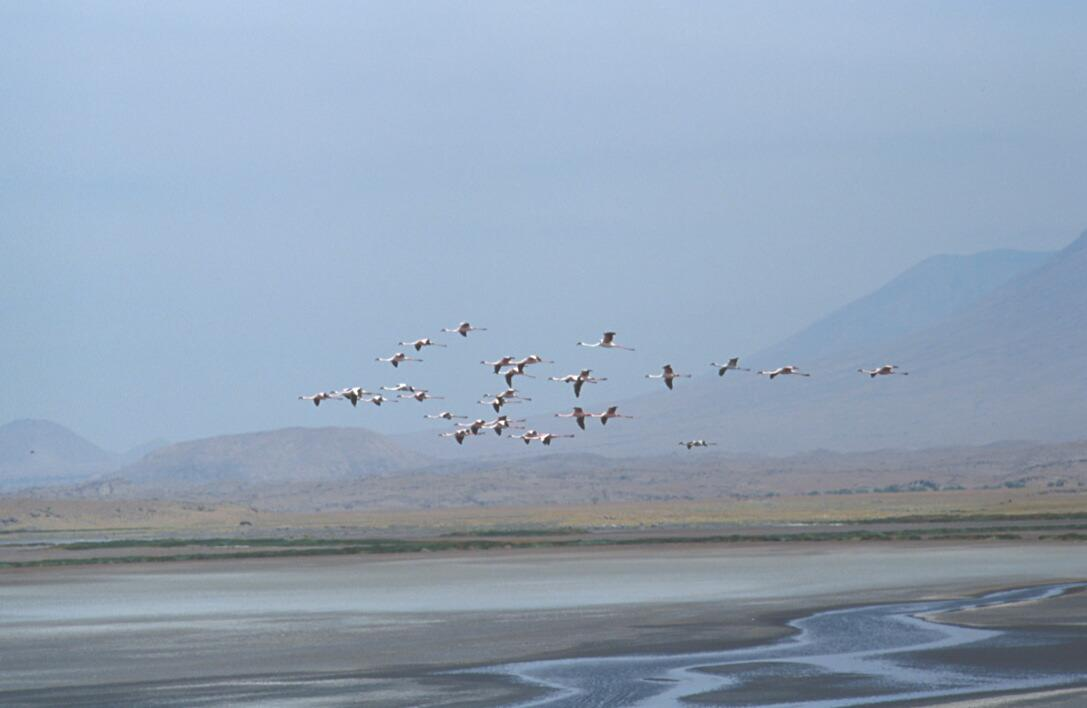
Lesser flamingos over Lake Natron

The Lake Natron basin has been designated a Wetlands of International Importance under the Ramsar Convention. However, in the past there have been plans to dam the Ewaso Ng'iro for hydroelectric power generation and for irrigation of the marshlands north of the lake, diverting water from other rivers to increase the flow. The plans would also include creating a variable freshwater lagoon with an area of about 50 square kilometres (19 sq mi).

If implemented, the impact on the lake's ecology could be drastic. Reduced salinity and pollution with agri-chemicals could wipe out the blue-green algae that provide food for the lesser flamingo. The lake is the main breeding ground for this near-threatened species. As of 2007 the dam project appeared to be on hold.
