= Franz Rottland =

German linguist (1934–2014)

- Born: 4 December 1934; Gelsenkirchen, Germany
- Died: 4 August 2014 (aged 79); Germany
- Occupation: Linguist

Academic background
- Education: Leiden University

Academic work
- Institutions: University of Bayreuth
- Main interests: Languages of Africa

Franz Rottland (4 December 1934 – 4 August 2014) was a German linguist and Africanist.

His interests included the historical linguistics of Nilotic languages and Cushitic languages.

== Biography ==
After receiving his doctorate on September 8, 1970, at Leiden University and his habilitation in 1979 at the University of Cologne, Rottland served as the Chair of African Studies II at the University of Bayreuth until 1998.

Rottland suffered from a fall in May 2014, then died in Germany on 4 August 2014, at the age of 79.

== Selected publications ==
- Die südnilotischen Sprachen. Beschreibung, Vergleichung und Rekonstruktion. Berlin 1982, ISBN 3-496-00161-5.
- editor, with Rainer Voßen: Afrikanische Wildbeuter. Internationales Symposion, Sankt Augustin, Januar 3–5, 1985 Tagungsberichte. African hunter gatherers. Hamburg 1986, ISBN 3-87118-761-5.
- editor: Festschrift zum 60. Geburtstag von Carl F. Hoffmann. Hamburg 1986, ISBN 3-87118-822-0.
- editor, with Lucia N. Omondi: Proceedings of the 3. Nilo-Saharan Linguistics Colloquium. Kisumu, Kenya, August 4–9, 1986. Hamburg 1991, ISBN 3-87548-001-5.
