= Akie language =

Endangered Kalenjin language of Tanzania

Akie
- Akiek, Mosiro
- kuuti táá akie
- Native to: Tanzania
- Region: Manyara Region
- Ethnicity: Akie
- Native speakers: <200 (2015)
- Language family: Nilo-Saharan?: Eastern Sudanic; Nilotic; Southern Nilotic; Kalenjin; Okiek–Akie; Akie

Language codes
- ISO 639-3: mwy (retired)
- Glottolog: mosi1247

Akie (Mosiro, Nandi, "(N)dorobo", Akie: kuuti táá akie 'mouth of the Akie people') is a Kalenjin language spoken in Tanzania. It is a moribund endangered language, with only a few elders who speak it. The Akie people have adopted Maasai and Swahili, and it was reported in 1981 that younger generations are becoming less fluent in Akie. No more than 200 people speak Akie as of 2015.

== Dialects ==
There is no dialectal variation in Akie.

== Phonology ==
=== Consonants ===
		Labial	Alveolar	Postalveolar	Retroflex	Palatal	Velar
Plosive	plain	p	t			c ⟨ch⟩	k
Plosive	geminated		tː ⟨tt⟩			cː ⟨cch⟩	kː ⟨kk⟩
Plosive	implosive	ɓ ⟨b⟩	ɗ ⟨d⟩			ʄ ⟨j⟩	ɠ ⟨g⟩
Fricative		(f)	s	ʃ ⟨sh⟩			
Nasal	plain	m	n			ɲ ⟨ny⟩	ŋ ⟨ng'⟩
Nasal	geminated	mː ⟨mm⟩	nː ⟨nn⟩				
Tap/Flap			ɾ ⟨r⟩		ɽ ⟨rr⟩		
Lateral	plain		l				
Lateral	geminated		lː ⟨ll⟩				
Approximant	plain	w				j ⟨y⟩	
Approximant	geminated					ⁱj ⟨yy⟩	

Geminated consonants /tː/, /cː/, /kː/, /mː/, /nː/ are not always distinguished by all speakers. /p/ is often realized as [ɸ], and also as [β] between vowels, but also as its basic value of [p] in all positions. Voiceless stops are typically realized as weak fortis consonants, however after nasals and intervocalically, they are voiced. [f] is only found in loanwords.

=== Vowels ===
	+ATR			-ATR		
	Front	Central	Back	Front	Central	Back
Close	i		u	ɪ		ʊ
Mid	e		o	ɛ		ɔ
Open		a				

Vowel length is distinctive.
