= Nguruman Escarpment =

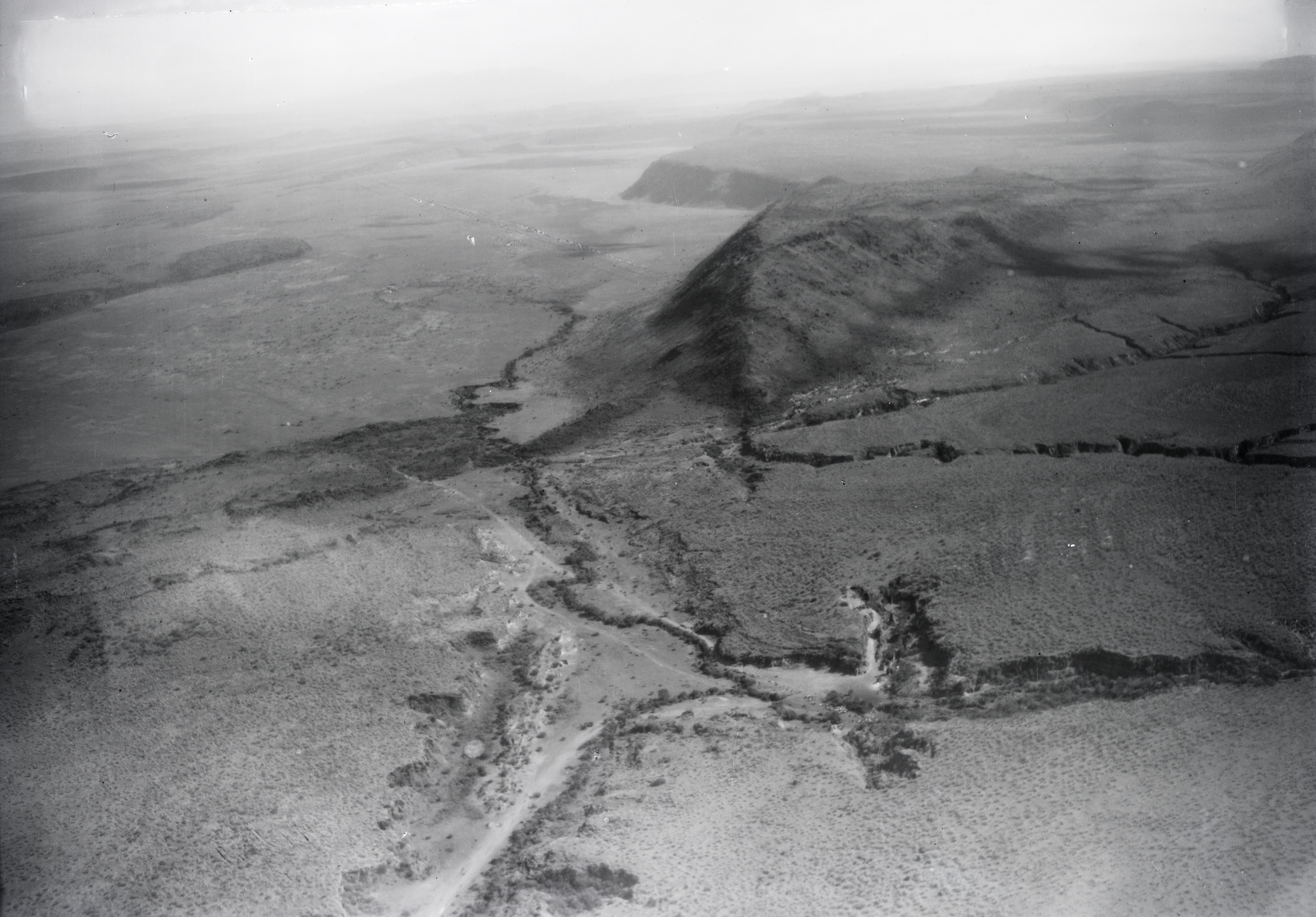

Highest point
- Coordinates: 1°45′42″S 36°01′32″E

Geography
- Location within Kenya
- Location: Kenya

Nguruman Escarpment is an escarpment in southern Kenya. The escarpment is around 50 kilometers long and elongated in the N-W direction. Its northern edge is approximately 120 km southwest of Nairobi, while the southern edge is near the Tanzanian border, at the northwestern corner of Lake Natron. The Southern Ewaso Ng'iro River flows southward along the foot of the escarpment, while Loita Hills are located west of the escarpment. The escarpment forms the western wall of the Great Rift Valley. Below it are the vast plains and the volcanic hills of the Great Rift Valley and in the distance are Lake Magadi and Lake Natron.

The valley floor is about 900m above sea level, while the elevation of the crest of the escarpment is about 2300m.

The Shompole Conservancy is located along the Nguruman Escarpment.
