= Akie people =

Ethnic group from Manyara Region of Tanzania

Akie
Waakie

Total population
- c. 5,268

Regions with significant populations
- Tanzania Manyara Region (Hanang District)

Languages
- Massai - adopted Akie

Religion
- Traditional African religions

Related ethnic groups
- Hadza, Sandawe, Ogiek - who like their relatives in Tanzania are one of the perls of originally khoisan-speaking hunter-gatherer cultures.

The Akie (sometimes called Mósiro, which is an Akie clan name, or Akiek, which is also used for the Okiek) are a Tanzanian ethnic and linguistic people living in south western Simanjiro District of Manyara Region. In 2000 the Akie population was counted at 5,268. The Akie, like other hunter-gatherer peoples in Kenya and Tanzania, are sometimes called by the derogatory and misleading term Dorobo or Wandorobo. The Akie were featured by Bruce Parry in the BBC series "Tribe" (10th episode, 2007). They live around 150 miles south east of Olduvai Gorge

== Exonym ==
The Akie are sometimes officially called Dorobo or Wandorobo, which is a derogatory Swahili exonym for them. This Swahili exonym is derived from the Maa words "Ol-dóróboni" and "Il-Tóróbo," which mean "people without cattle".

== Lifestyle ==
The Akie are one of the last actual hunter-gatherer groups left on the African savanna. Beside hunting they collect honey, which involves 'steaming' out the bees, making it possible for to reach into the hive and grab the honey. They enjoy beer which they make from honey. Due to competition for land with the Maasai, they have recently been more reliant on maize, although this rarely produces enough food to last year around.

The Akie's closest ethnic and linguistic relatives may be the Ogiek who live farther north in Tanzania and mainly Kenya. They may have been farmers, but were forced to migrate south and resume a hunter-gatherer lifestyle after some hardship. The Akie used to cover the Maasai Steppe, but now agriculture, poaching and other hunters have diminished the natural resources forcing the Akie into a bitter rivalry with the Maasai over land and water.
