= Okiek people =

Ogiek or Akiek or Okiek
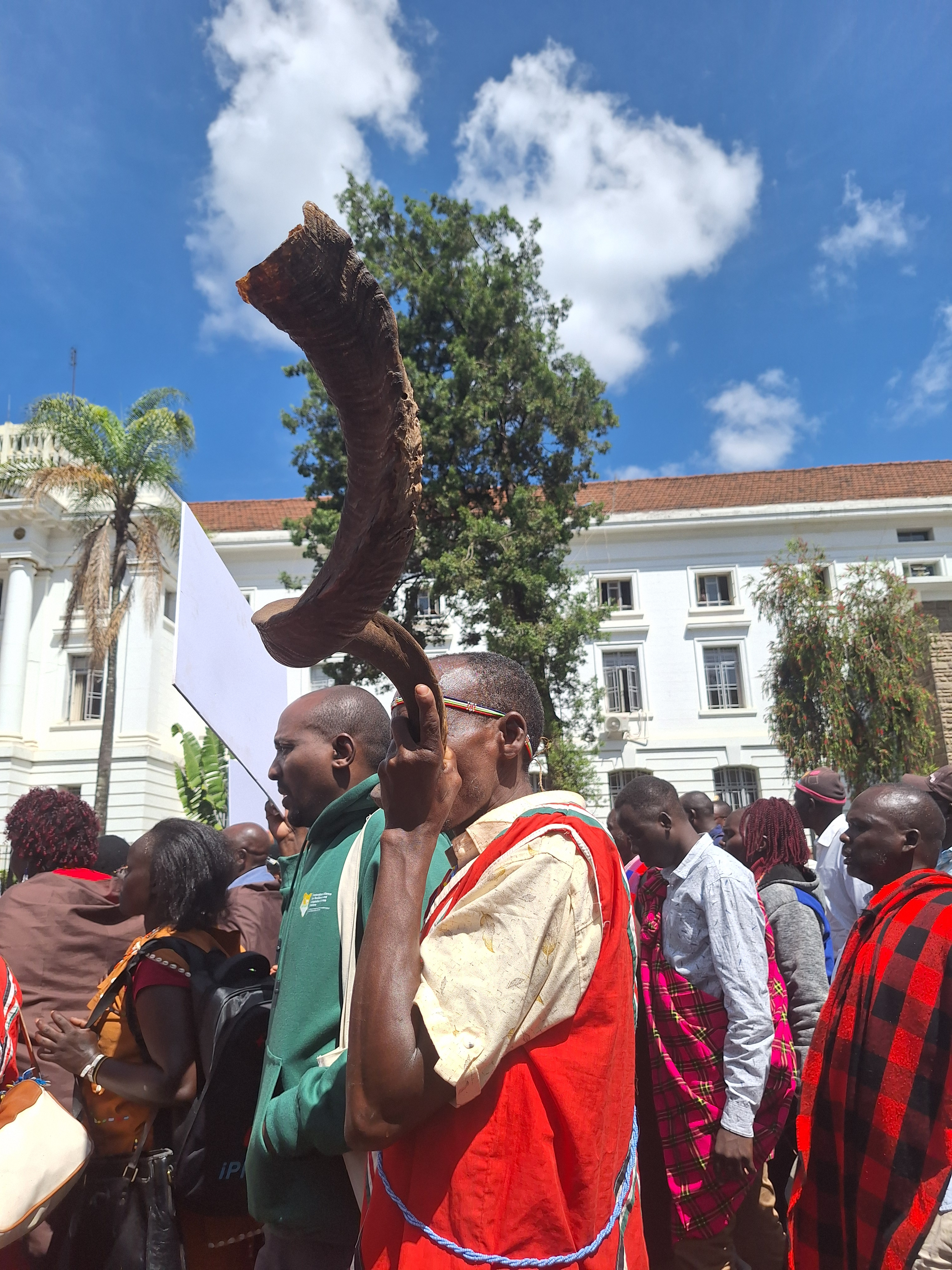
- The Ogiek community in Kenya blowing a horn during a procession in Nairobi City.

Total population
- Kenya 52,596 (2019, census)

Languages
- Ogiek, Kipsigis, Nandi and Swahili

Related ethnic groups
- Kipsigis people and Nandi people

The Okiek (also known as Ogiek or Akiek) are an autochthonous Southern Nilotic tribe of the Kalenjin speaking peoples and are among the oldest aboriginal inhabitants of East Africa. Primarily characterized as hunter-gatherers, they represent a distinct historical and cultural classification within the Kalenjin ethnic group. Inhabiting the highland forests of Kenya, primarily the Mau Forest and Mount Elgon, as well as parts of northern Tanzania, the Okiek are regarded as the foundational inhabitants of the region, predating most modern ethnolinguistic groups. Their presence in these highlands is described as being from time immemorial, with archaeological & historical estimates suggesting a lineage in the area dating as far back as 4000 BCE.

Within the Kalenjin identity, the Okiek are frequently identified as the linguistic and cultural "seedbed" of the Southern Nilotic collective, representing the aboriginal ties to the Mau Forest and Mount Kenya regions before the 17th century. Unlike other Kalenjin subgroups who trace their migrations from the Nile Basin, Egypt, Sudan, or Ethiopia, Ogiek oral traditions suggest they did not migrate from elsewhere but were already present in the highland forests since time immemorial. As one of the oldest surviving indigenous communities in East Africa, the Ogiek are often viewed as the aboriginal ancestors or predecessors of the modern Kalenjin people.

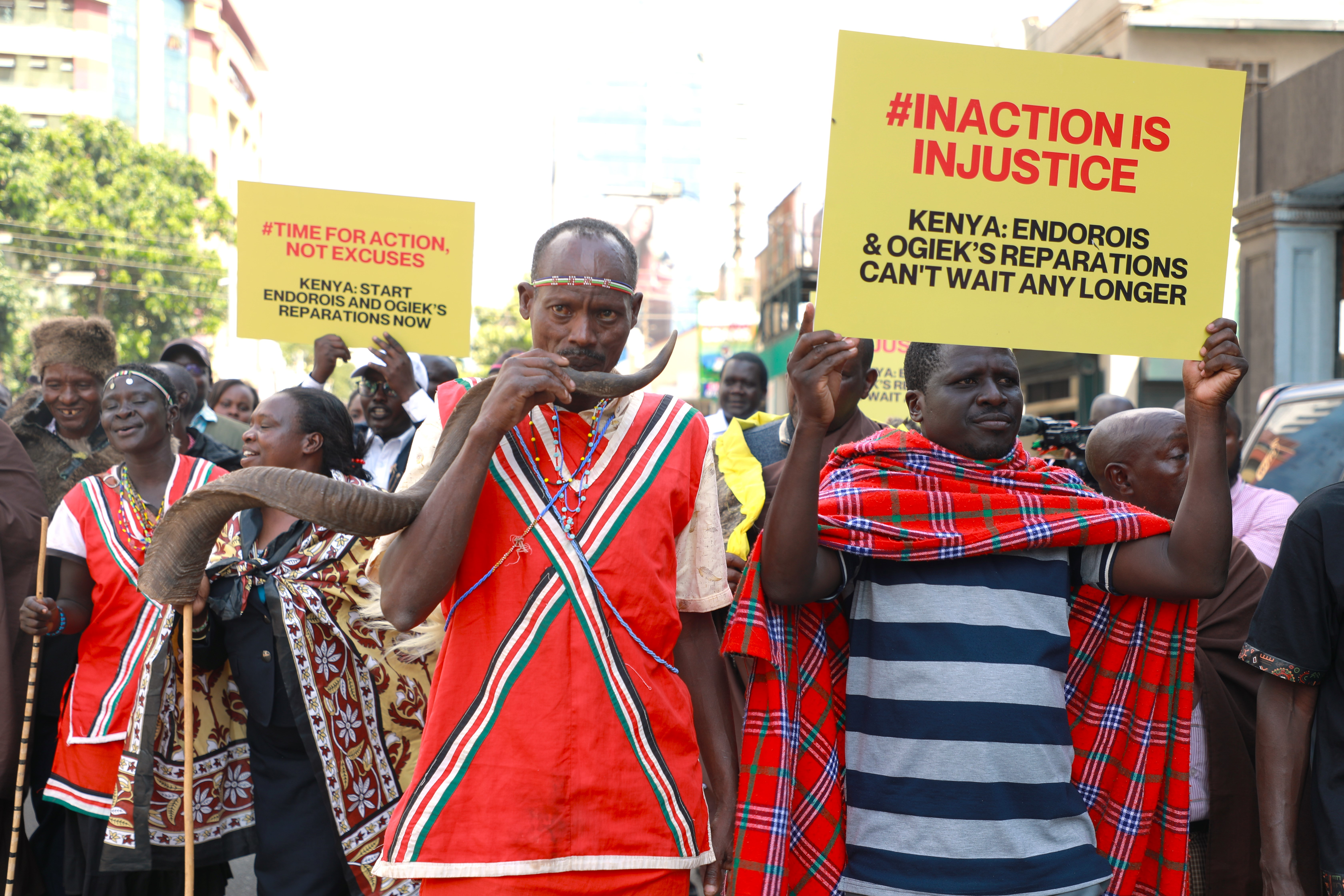
Ogiek Peoples of Kenya in a peaceful demonstration demanding for their land rights

Historically characterized as Southern Nilotic hunter-gatherers and honey-harvesters, the Okiek have maintained a distinct lifestyle centered on forest conservation and beekeeping. While the 2019 Kenya Census recorded their population of 52,596, their Ogiek dialect is highly endangered, with some estimates placing the number of fluent Akiek speakers as low as 500, many of them predominately speaking Kipsigis. In recent years, the community has secured landmark legal victories in the African Court on Human and Peoples' Rights, which officially recognized their status as indigenous owners of their ancestral lands and ordered the full recognition of their language and cultural practices.

== History ==
In 1903, C.W.Hobley recorded eleven Okiek communities, a hunter-gatherer society, living in western Kenya. He noted that a number of entire sections were bi-lingual, speaking either Kipsigis, Maasai or Nandi in addition to their own languages.

Hunter-gatherer communities also lived on the eastern highlands of Kenya where they were known in local traditions by the names "Gumba" and "Athi".

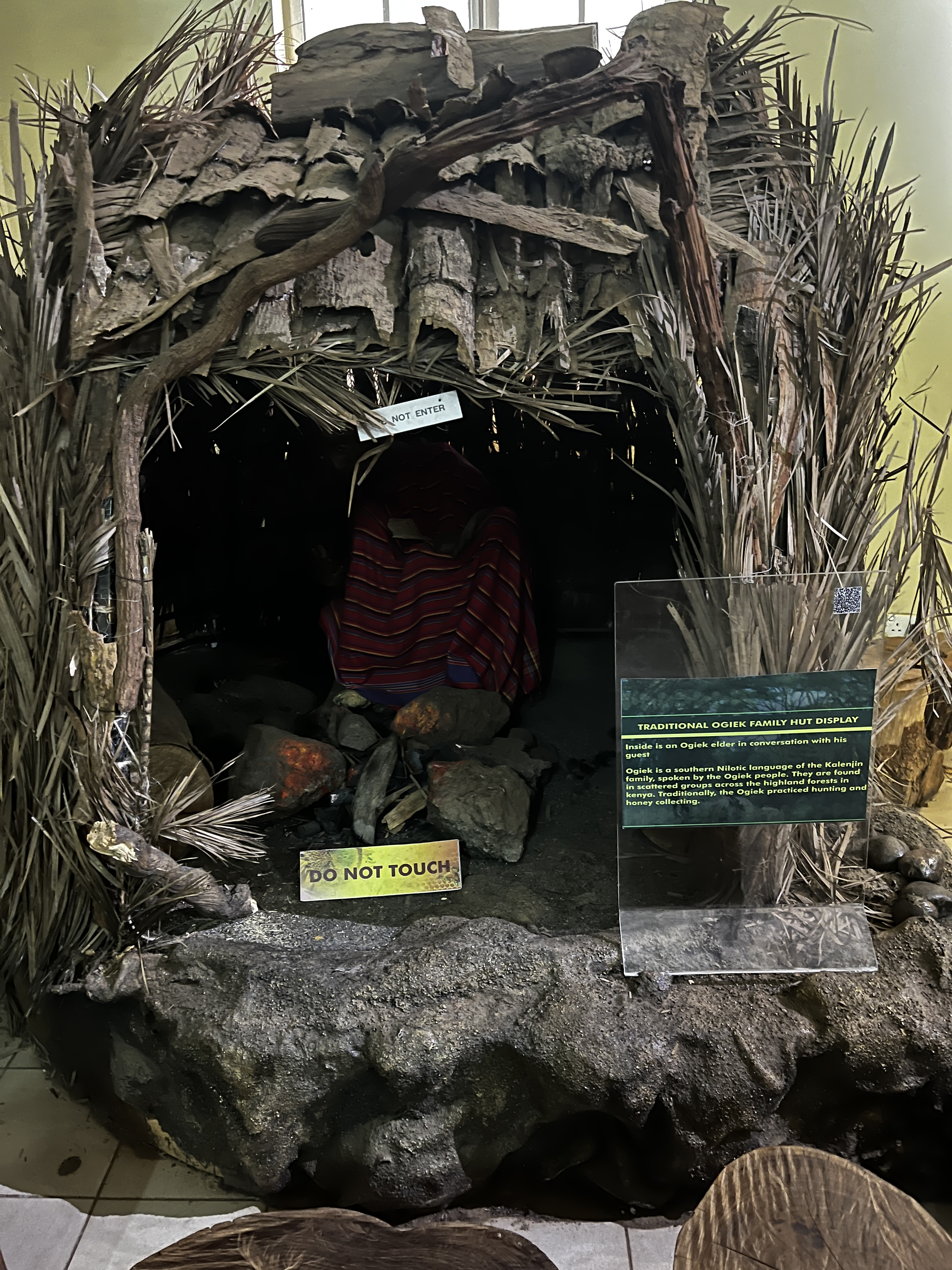
Traditional Ogiek family hut display at the Nairobi National Museum

== Language ==
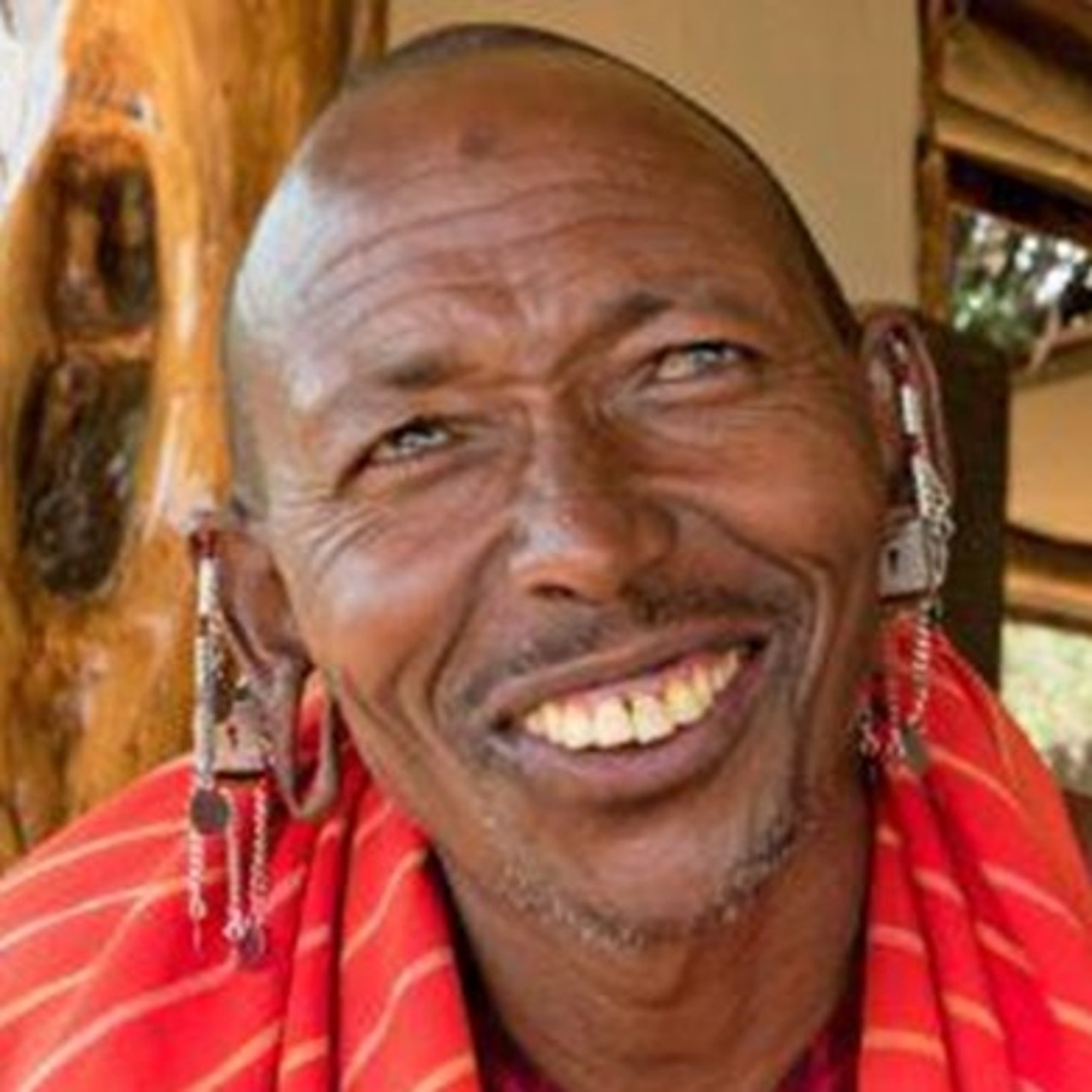
An Ogiek man from Kenya

Linguistically, the Ogiek (or Okiek) speak a collection of Southern Nilotic dialects within the Kalenjin macrolanguage, though their tongue is distinct for its specialized vocabulary regarding forest ecology and beekeeping—terms often absent in the pastoralist-focused dialects of their neighbors. While the ethnic population is over 52,000, the UNESCO Atlas of the World's Languages in Danger classifies their language as critically endangered, with fluent speakers possibly numbering as few as 500 as younger generations shift toward Kipsigis, Maasai, or Swahili. Despite this shift, the language remains a vital cultural marker of their identity as "caretakers" of the forest, preserving an ancient linguistic layer that predates the arrival of larger migratory groups in the East African highlands.

== Land disputes ==
The Ogiek have made numerous claims against the government of Kenya alleging unfair treatment, especially that they have been illegally dispossessed of their land. Timsales Ltd is active in deforestation in its area for long. It is partly owned by relatives of former presidents Kenyatta and Moi.

On June 23, 2022, the African Court on Human and Peoples' Rights ruled that the Kenyan government must pay the Okiek 157,850,000 shillings for decades of material and moral damages, recognize their indigeneity and help get them official titles to their ancestral lands.

== Notable Okiek people ==
- Naiyan Kiplagat, environmental activist.
