= Kalenjin people =

Kalenjin
Biikap Kuutiit ('Speech community'), Miot
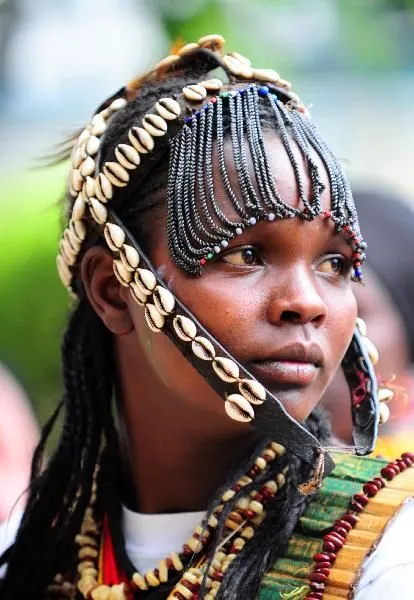

Total population
- approx. 7.5 million (East Africa)

Regions with significant populations
- East Africa (Kenya, Uganda, Tanzania, South Sudan, and Ethiopia)
- Kenya: 6,358,113 (2019 census)

Languages
- Kalenjin languages, English, Swahili

Religion
- Kalenjin Mythology, Roman Catholicism, Protestantism, African traditional religions, Asisian Religion; Minority: Irreligion & Islam

Related ethnic groups
- Kipsigis; Nandi; Pokot; Keiyo; Tugen; Marakwet; Sabaot; Sebei; Terik; Lembus; Ogiek; Sengwer; Endorois; Arror; Endo; Senger; Datooga; Barabaig; Daasanach; Omotik people; Murle; Didinga

The Kalenjin are a Southern Nilotic ethnic group native to East Africa, encompassing over 20 Kalenjin-speaking tribes and sub-groups sharing a common cultural and linguistic lineage. The primary tribes in Kenya, ordered by population, include the Kipsigis, Nandi, Pokot, Keiyo, Sabaot (including the Sebei of Uganda), Tugen, Marakwet, Arror, Lembus, Ogiek, and others. They represent Kenya's third-largest ethnic group, with a population of 6,358,113 per the 2019 census. The collective also includes the Endorois, Sengwer, Terik, Samor, Endo, and Senger, alongside Datooga clusters of Tanzania.

The Kalenjin-speaking peoples are descendants of the Maliri of Uganda, a lineage they share with the Daasanach (Marille) of the Omo Valley in Ethiopia. They were influenced culturally and genetically by Omotic-speaking populations, as well as the Iraqw and Maasai. Their linguistic seedbed is attributed to the autochthonous Ogiek (Dorobo) and Agumba/Umpua/Lumbwa inhabitants of the Mau Forest and Mount Kenya regions, who represent the aboriginal ties to the area prior to the 17th century.

Geographically and linguistically classified as Highland Nilotes, this group's designation is derived from their ancestral heartland within the high-altitude escarpments of Kenya's Rift Valley, though their presence extends across the diverse elevations of the region and beyond. The Kalenjin are globally recognized for their unparalleled success in international long-distance running, frequently cited as leading examples of athletic dominance in sports history; the community has produced many of the world's premier runners (e.g., Eliud Kipchoge, Faith Kipyegon, Beatrice Chebet.) They account for a significant majority of the country's elite international athletics medals.

Kalenjin people collectively share a distinct cultural and linguistic heritage. They have a very strong and direct connection to the Nile Valley and Ethiopian highlands, tracing their ancestral migration from these regions. The Kalenjin languages form a specific branch of the Southern Nilotic group within the broader Nilo-Saharan language family.

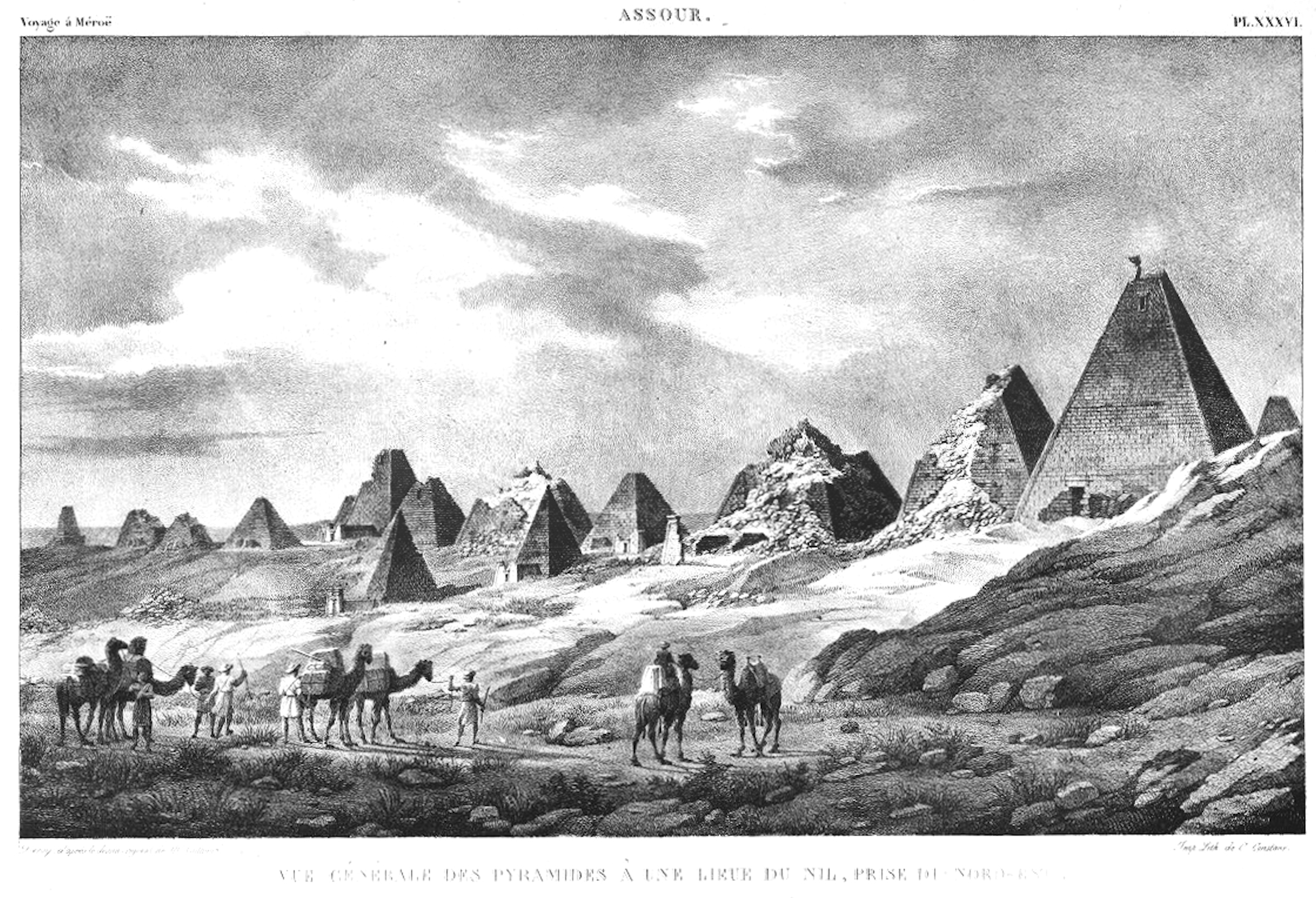
The Nubian pyramids of Meroë are a collection of over 200 steep-sided, stone-built tombs in modern-day Sudan, constructed between roughly 300 BCE and 350 CE by the rulers of the Kingdom of Kush. These smaller, UNESCO-listed monuments served as burial places for kings, queens, and officials, reflecting a blend of ancient Egyptian and Nilotic influences.

This history is defined by significant cultural interaction with Southern/Eastern Cushitic-speaking communities, from whom the Kalenjin adopted key social institutions, including the age-set system (ipinda), the practice of circumcision, and specific loanwords related to livestock and social organization. The Kipsigis tribe are believed to have originated further north, with traditional narratives linking them to the Pharaoh's army in Egypt. They reportedly grew disillusioned with the Pharaoh's inability to reliably win wars and forged their own path, embracing an independent "us against the world" attitude. The migration south involved significant territorial expansion at the expense of the Luo, Gusii (Kisii), and Maasai. This expansion was driven by a period of Kalenjin military dominance, specifically through the Kipsigis' use of superior weaponry and tactics, utilizing heavy buffalo-hide shields and advanced close-combat techniques to overwhelm local defenses. These historical shifts defined the current borders, with these tribes now situated as their western and southern neighbors. Scholars like Dr. Kipkoeech Arap Sambu have argued that many Kalenjin words have roots in ancient Egyptian or Semitic languages. For example, the Kalenjin word for land, Emet, is compared to the ancient Egyptian Kemet. Some theories suggest the ancestors of the Kalenjin left Egypt at the same time as the Israelites but migrated south toward the Rift Valley while the Israelites moved north.

According to Kalenjin oral traditions, their ancestors are linked to the ancient civilizations of the Nile Valley, specifically an origin point known as Misiri — often interpreted as ancient Egypt. Potential linguistic similarities, such as the Kalenjin sun deity Asiis being compared to the Egyptian goddess Isis, as evidence of a historical cultural link. Archaeological and linguistic evidence places the cradle of the Nilotic languages in the Nile Valley, which maintained strong cultural links with the societies of the Nubian Nile Valley further north. These connections were reinforced by thousands of years of social and genetic intermixing, as evidenced by significant Nilotic-related ancestry found in ancient Nubian populations. This shared heritage is reflected in similar pastoral traditions, pottery styles, and burial customs across the broader Nile Basin. Following a southward migration that began around 500 BCE, they settled predominantly in the Rift Valley region of Kenya, with significant populations also residing in Uganda, Tanzania and broader East Africa.

Prior to the 2010 Constitution, the Rift Valley was Kenya’s largest and most populous province, headquartered in Nakuru and spanning over 182,000 square kilometers. The region remains the primary homeland of the Kalenjin people, who represent the area's largest ethnic group across its now-devolved counties.

Native to Eastern Africa, the Kalenjin primarily reside in the Rift Valley region of Kenya, specifically in areas formerly encompassing the Rift Valley Province in Kenya with substantial populations in the counties of Kericho, Nandi, Bomet, Baringo, Uasin Gishu, Elgeyo-Marakwet, West Pokot, Trans Nzoia, Nakuru, and Narok. In Uganda the Kalenjin-related population primarily reside in the Eastern Region on the slopes of Mount Elgon (Sabiny/Sebei) and the Karamoja sub-region for (Pokot). They are estimated to be approximately 300,000 to 400,000 Kalenjin people in Uganda with most belonging to the Sabiny (Sebei) and Pokot ethnic groups. In Tanzania, they are concentrated in the Manyara and Singida regions, as well as areas around Lake Eyasi (represented by the related Datooga groups). The Datooga (includes Barabaig) approximately ~210,000 and are concentrated in the north-central regions of Tanzania. The Murle, Didinga, Tennet, and Laarim share a direct ancestral bond with the Kalenjin, having once lived as a single tribe in the Ethiopian highlands near the Omo River. Although they now belong to the Southwestern Surmic language branch, oral traditions from both South Sudan and Kenya and linguistic research identify them as descendants of a single ancestral entity and confirm that the Kalenjin split from this unified body during a southward migration to settle in their current territories in Rift Valley Kenya. This shared heritage is evidenced today by significant linguistic similarities and common cultural practices that persist across international borders.

== Proto-Kalenjin ==
=== Prehistory & Origin ===
The earliest ancestors of Nilotic-speaking peoples emerged from mobile pastoralists integrated with ancient Egyptian communities including the now-extinct river system of the Lower Wadi Howar (Yellow Nile) during the Early Holocene (c. 10000–6000 BCE). These groups practiced various traditions including cattle herding, fishing, and agriculture. Maintained strong cultural links with pre-Kerma societies of the Nubian Nile Valley.

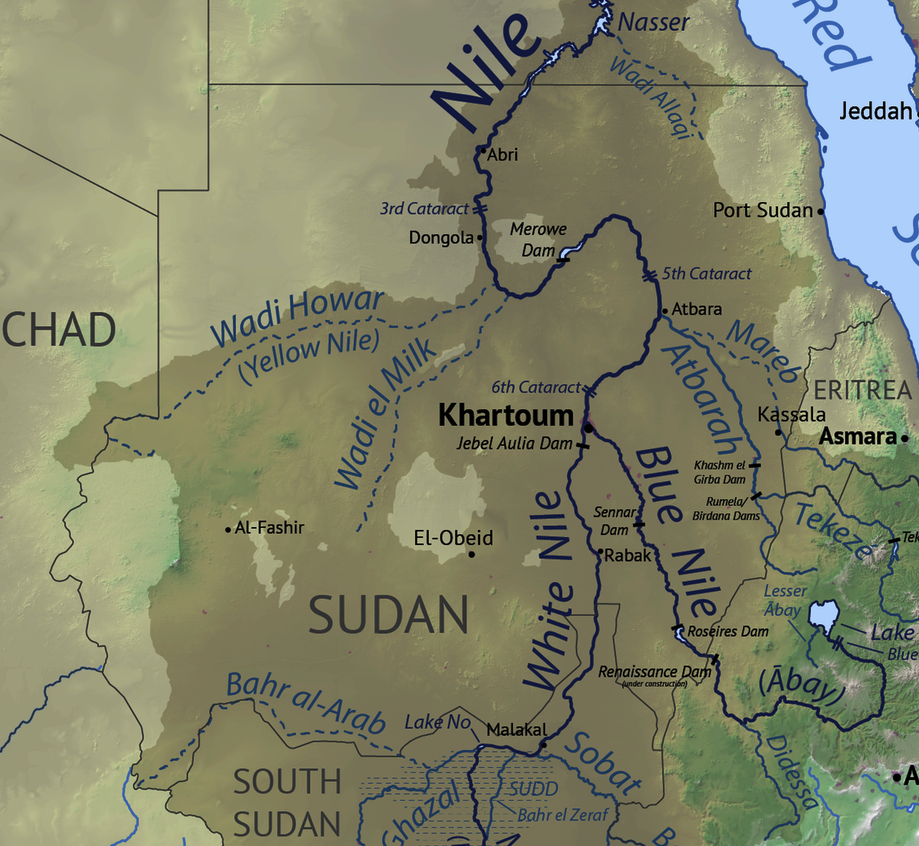
Map of Nile tributaries in modern Southern Egypt, Sudan, South Sudan and Ethiopia.

As the Sahara gradually became more arid after 4000 BCE, they migrated eastward into the Nile Valley and the White Nile basin, forming the demographic and cultural roots of what would become the Nilotic-speaking peoples. Composed of varied distinct identities, they were commonly collectively referred to as the Nehesy (southerners), descendants of the ancient Egyptian civilization, Aethiopians by the Greeks and Cushi (Cushites or Kushites) by the Israelites, a term that possibly derived from their own name for themselves.

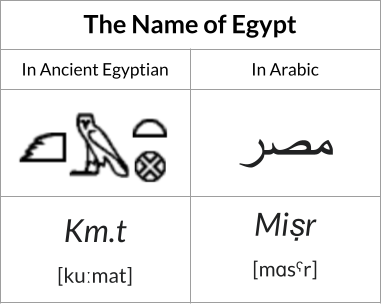
Kemet (km.t), or "Black Land," is the name ancient Egyptians used for their country, appearing regularly from the 11th-12th dynasty. Some evidence suggests it appeared as early as the Old Kingdom in the Nile Valley to emphasize the indigenous African roots of the civilization.

In Kalenjin folklore, the "Misiri" legend suggests their ancestors were part of the Pharaonic civilization and migrated southwards along the Nile. Some accounts even claim this migration occurred to escape invasions, such as the Persian invasion of Egypt around 525 BCE. Proponents of the Egyptian origin argue that Eurocentric bias has historically marginalized the connections between Ancient Egypt and sub-Saharan African cultures, and they view the proto-Kalenjin as a "living link" to that ancient civilization.

== Proto-Nilotic ==
By the third millennium BCE, a proto-Nilotic identity had taken shape, likely tied to the development of a cattle-based pastoral economy and growing social complexity. Linguistic evidence places the cradle of Nilotic languages in the eastern Middle Nile Basin, just south of the Abbai (Blue Nile) River—roughly southeast of present-day Khartoum. Archaeological sites such as Kadero—located north of Khartoum—demonstrate that communities associated with early Nilotic culture were already well established in the Nile Valley by this time.

These societies combined herding, fishing on the Nile, and cultivation, with long-distance trade and distinctive burial traditions, features that continued among Nilotic groups into later periods. These communities included early groups such as the Sapaei, Kolobi, and Nuba—of whom the latter are particularly noted for their involvement in the gold trade, which likely contributed to both their name and the later toponym Nubian.

== History ==
=== Antiquity ===
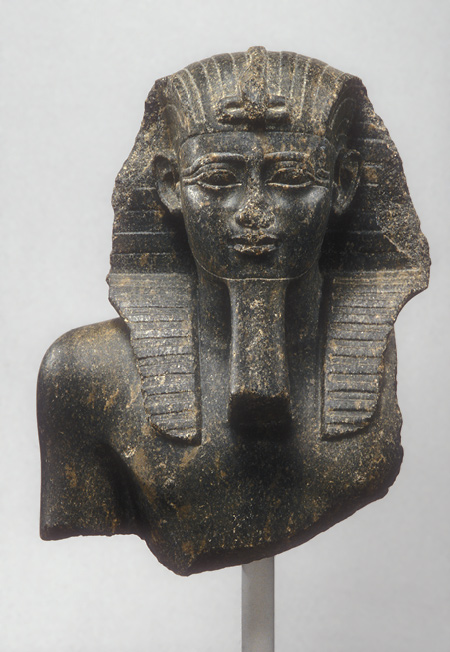
Psamtik I, pharaoh of Egypt 664–610 BC. According to Pliny, the Sape or Sapaei—also called 'Esar'— lived for 300 years in a town founded by Egyptians fleeing his rule.

Classical sources such as Ptolemy's Geography (c. 150 CE) refer to a people called the Memnones living between the Nile and the Blue Nile near Meroë, and south of them the Sapaei—areas and peoples that correspond closely to the archaeological and historical heartland of early Nilotic speakers. In Greco-Roman literature, the Memnones were often associated with the mythic "Ethiopians" or the descendants of Memnon—a Homeric figure said to rule over powerful, dark-skinned peoples of the Upper Nile. These designations, while partly mythological might reflect ancient recognition of an enduring Kushite elite in the region. The Sapaei whom he places south of his Memnones might perhaps be associated with, or find resonance in, the people referred to by Pliny (77 CE) as the Sape—a group described in relation to towns founded by Egyptian exiles. According to Pliny's source Bion, the Sape (called "Esar" by Aristocreon) were so named because the term meant "the strangers," and were said to have dwelt for three hundred years in a town originally established by Egyptians fleeing the rule of Psammetichus (Psamtik). Though speculative, this likely represents a historical reference to southern Nilotic speaking groups.

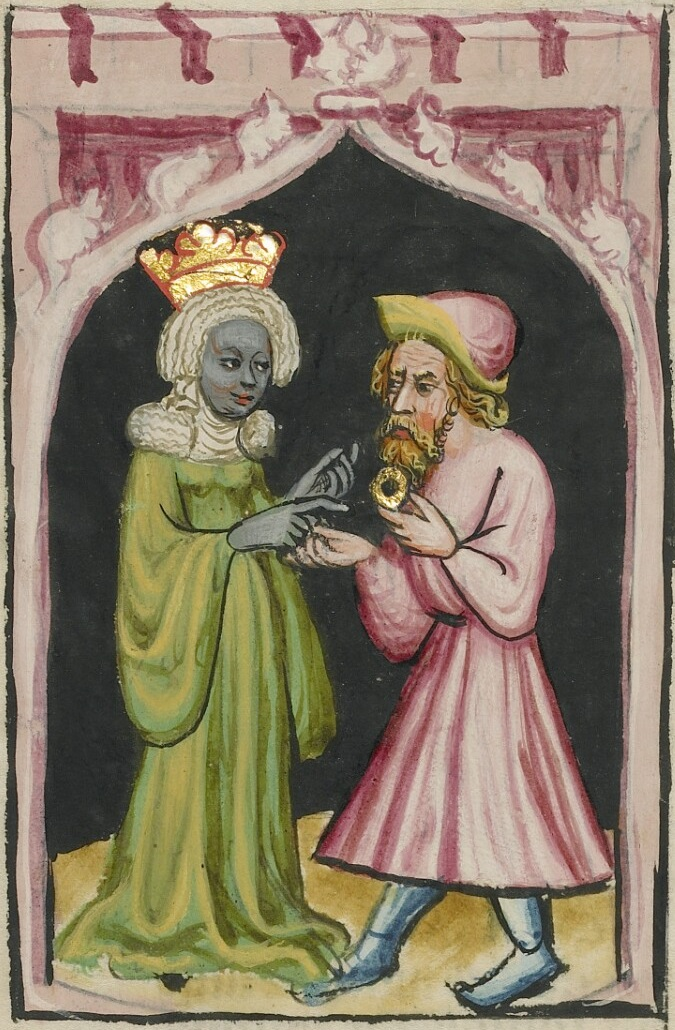
According to the first-century Romano-Jewish scholar Josephus, Tharbis was the daughter of an unnamed king of "Saba", which he claimed was in Ethiopia

Starting in about the 5th century CE, Nilotic speakers began moving south. This movement took place during a time of major political and cultural shifts across the Nile Valley. Even as late as the 4th century, the ancient Kushite kingdom still exerted influence in Lower Nubia, as seen in a joint embassy of Ethiopians (Kushites) and Blemmyes to Emperor Constantine around AD 336. But by the 5th century, Kushite political structures had collapsed, creating a power vacuum in the region.

=== Medieval ===
The Nilotic migrations gained momentum in the 11th century, coinciding with the arrival of Arab traders in central Sudan. Although these later migrations significantly predate the collapse of the Christian Nubian kingdoms of Makuria and Alodia (around 1500 CE), they occur after early contact with Arabs (c.9-10 century), a contact that may have introduced new cultural and technological elements, such as humpless cattle breeds. It was during this later stage that communities ancestral to the Southern Nilotes started moving into the grasslands and wetlands of what is now South Sudan, Uganda, and western Kenya—ushering in the cultural transitions that would define the early Pastoral Iron Age in East Africa.

== Modern history ==
=== Pre-19th century ===
A body of oral traditions from various East African communities points to the presence of at least four significant Kalenjin-speaking population groups present prior to the 19th century. The earliest mention appears to be of the Lumbwa. Meru oral history describes the arrival of their ancestors at Mount Kenya where they interacted with this community. The Lumbwa occupied the lower reaches of Mount Kenya though the extent of their territory is presently unclear.

North-east of this community, across the Rift Valley, a community known as the Chok (later Suk) occupied the Elgeyo escarpment. Pokot oral history describes their way of life, as that of the Chemwal whose country may have been known as Chemngal, a community that appears to have lived in association with the Chok. The Chemwal appear to have been referred to as Siger by the Karamojong on account of a distinctive cowrie shell adornment favored by the women of this community. The area occupied by the Chemwal stretched between Mount Elgon and present day Uasin Gishu as well as into a number of surrounding counties.

Far west, a community known as the Maliri occupied present-day Jie and Dodoth country in Uganda. The Karamojong would eject them from this region over the course of the century and their traditions describe these encounters with the Maliri. The arrival in the district of the latter community is thought by some to be in the region of six to eight centuries ago.

To the north of Chemngal were the Oropom (Orupoi), a late neolithic society whose expansive territory is said to have stretched across Turkana and the surrounding region as well as into Uganda and Sudan. Wilson (1970) who collected traditions relating to the Oropom observed that the corpus of oral literature suggested that, at its tail end, the society "had become effete, after enjoying for a long period the fruits of a highly developed culture". Bordering the Maliri in Uganda were the Karamojong, an Iron Age community that practiced a pastoral way of life.

Towards the end of 18th century and through the 19th century, a series of droughts, plagues of locusts, epidemics, and in the final decades of the 19th century, a rapid succession of sub-continental epizootics affected these communities. There is an early record of the great Laparanat drought c.1785 that affected the Karamajong. However, for communities then resident in what is present-day Kenya many disaster narratives relate the start with the Aoyate, an acute meteorological drought that affected much of East and Southern Africa. Nile records distinctly indicate a start about 1800 while oral narratives and the few written records indicate peak aridity during the 1830s resulting in a notable famine in 1836. This arid period, and the consequent series of events, have been referred to as (the first) Mutai.

A feature of the Mutai was increased conflict between neighboring communities, most noted of these has been the Iloikop wars.

== Biblical Parallels and "Lost Tribe" Theories ==
The "Lost Tribe" theory posits that the Kalenjin are descendants of one of the "Lost Ten Tribes of Israel," a narrative mirrored by other African groups like the Lemba. While many historians attribute these similarities to ancient cultural contact between Nilotic, Cushitic, and Semitic peoples in the Nile Valley, scholars like Dr. Kipkoeech araap Sambu argue for deeper linguistic and historical ties. In his foundational work, The Misiri Legend Explored (2011/2015), Sambu analyzes parallels such as the Kalenjin word for land, Emet, and the ancient Egyptian Kemet, suggesting the group migrated south from Egypt (Misiri) during the same era as the biblical Exodus. Complementing this view, Philip Ochieng’s 2020 article, Kalenjin: Another lost tribe of Israel?, explores shared ritualistic markers, specifically comparing the biblical mass circumcision at Gilgal to Kalenjin traditions at Gilgil, further reinforcing the theory of a migration that mirrored the Israelite journey.

=== Asiisian Spirituality of the Kalenjin People ===
Kalenjin oral traditions frequently claim ancestral origins in "Misiri" (ancient Egypt) and identify as the "lineage of Joseph." Proponents of the "Misiri" legend cite parallels between Kalenjin culture and ancient Egyptian or Hebraic practices—such as monotheistic worship of a supreme being called Asis (resembling Isis or Aten), strict circumcision rites, and specific dietary laws as evidence of a direct historical link.

== Pastoral Iron Age ==
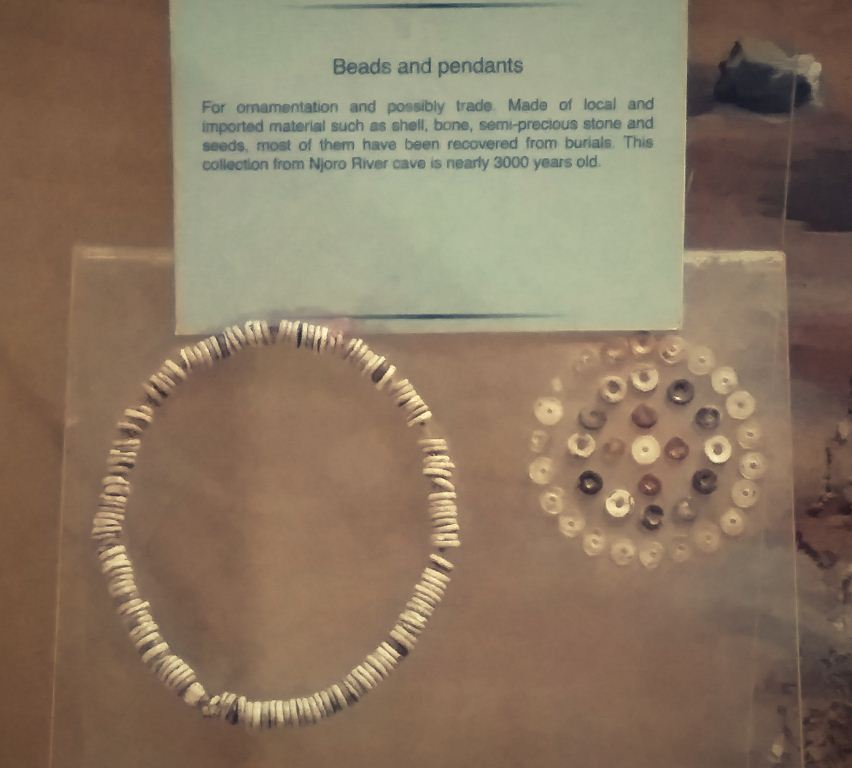
The beads and pendants forming this c. 3,000-year-old neck chain are of the Elmenteitan culture and were among the finds at Njoro River Cave.

The Elmenteitan culture, named after Lake Elmenteita by Louis Leakey, flourished during the East African Pastoral Neolithic (c. 3300–1200 BP) across the western plains of Kenya. It represents a distinct archaeological tradition characterized by a unique lithic industry, specialized land use, and a blend of hunting and early pastoralism. Beads, pendants, and burials found at sites such as the Njoro River Cave reflect a sophisticated material culture and ritual life.

Genetic studies of individuals from Elmenteitan sites reveal a strikingly homogeneous population, composed predominantly of Early Northeastern Pastoralist (ENP) ancestry—linked to Afro-Asiatic (Cushitic) speakers—blended with a minority of forager-related ancestry. This ENP group emerged from a prior admixture between ancient northeast Africans (possibly with ties to the Nile Valley or Egypt) and Dinka-related populations of Sudan, likely taking place north of Lake Turkana between 6000 and 5000 BP. The southward expansion of Elmenteitan and contemporaneous Savanna Pastoral Neolithic herders after ~3300 BP involved limited interaction with foragers, suggesting that despite economic exchanges, significant cultural boundaries remained intact.

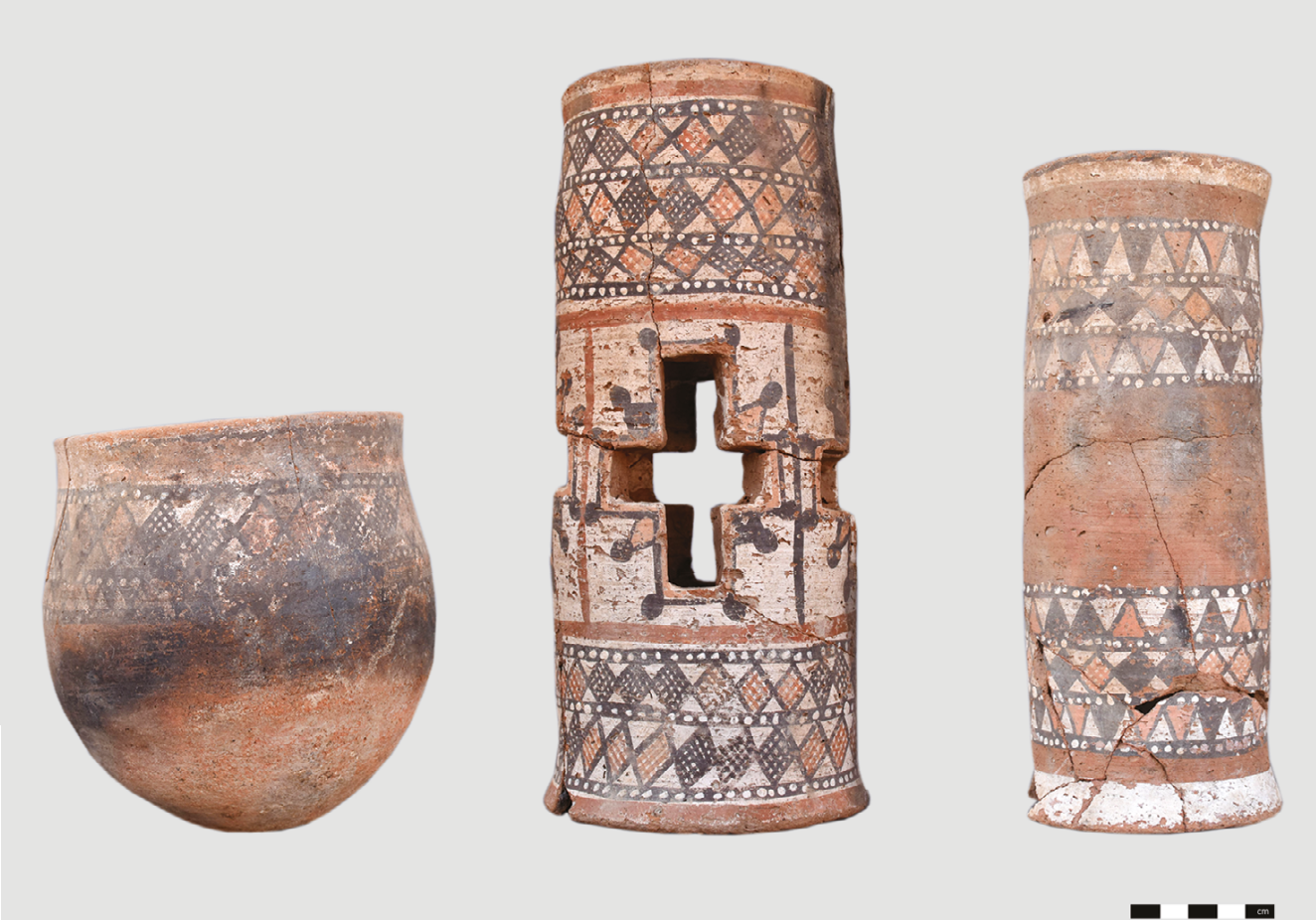
Pottery from Soba (Soba ware)

By the Pastoral Iron Age (c. 1200–1600 CE), genetic profiles shift notably, with up to 60% Nilotic-related ancestry among populations in Kenya and Tanzania—indicating renewed demographic expansion by Nilotic-speaking groups. Archaeological evidence records a transition toward more fortified and sedentary lifeways, culminating in the emergence of the Sirikwa culture, viewed as a direct outgrowth of Elmenteitan traditions shaped by ongoing Nilotic influence.

The Sirikwa archaeological tradition, prominent in the Kenyan highlands, is marked by fortified homesteads, internal livestock pens, and structured gate systems—features suggesting concerns with security and herd management rather than warfare. These communities occupied a wide territory stretching from the Mau and Chepalungu forests to Mount Elgon and the Cherangany Hills. Oral traditions preserved by Kalenjin-speaking groups like the Nandi, Pokot, and Kony remember the Sirikwa as a multi-ethnic plateau society, known variously as Sirikwek, il-Mukwan, or Uasin Gishu, and often linked to the earlier Uasin Gishu culture.

Material remains—including coins of Indian and English origin found at Hyrax Hill—reveal participation in regional trade networks, while enduring structures such as Sirikwa holes, tumuli, and megaliths reflect a rich and persistent cultural legacy. Over time, the distinct Sirikwa identity was absorbed into emerging Kalenjin polities such as the Nandi, Kipsigis, and Pokot. However, their imprint endures in oral history, lineage systems, and the archaeological landscape.

In sum, the transition from the Elmenteitan to the Sirikwa tradition encapsulates a long arc of population movement, cultural fusion, and technological transformation that underpins the origins of Southern Nilotic communities in the East African highlands.

== Tribes and sub-groups ==
The Kalenjin-speaking peoples consist of over 25 distinct tribes and sub-groups distributed across East Africa. Historically and linguistically, these communities are organized into several major clusters based on geographical distribution and ancestral ties:

=== Central and Southern Clusters ===
- Kipsigis: The most populous Kalenjin tribe, primarily inhabiting the southern Rift Valley namely Bomet, Kericho and Nakuru counties, with significant presence in Nandi, Uasin Gishu, Trans Nzoia and Laikipia counties (approx. 1,905,983).
- Nandi: Historically centered in Nandi County, Uasin Gishu and Trans Nzoia Counties with some in Nakuru and Laikipia (approx. 949,000).
- Terik: An ancestral group historically integrated with the Nandi but maintaining a distinct identity.

=== Northern and Eastern Clusters ===
- Pokot: A large cross-border group inhabiting both pastoral and agricultural zones such as Wast Pokot and Baringo East in Kenya and some areas in Uganda (approx. 800,000+).
- Marakwet: Including the Endo, Talai, and Almo sub-groups of the Kerio Valley. Many have moved to Uasin Gishu County.
- Sengwer: Also known as the Cherang'any, traditionally residing in the Cherang'any Hills.

=== Highland and Escarpment Clusters ===
- Keiyo: Centered in the highlands and the Elgeyo Escarpment (approx. 495,000). They are one of the dominant people of Uasin Gishu alongside the majority Nandi, Kikuyu and Luhya.
- Tugen: A diverse cluster including the Arror, Samor, and Lembus sub-groups of Baringo County.
- Endorois: A community traditionally residing around Lake Bogoria and the Muchongoi Forest.

=== Mount Elgon and Western Clusters ===
- Sabaot: Includes the Bong'omek, Book, and Somek sub-groups on the Kenyan side of Mount Elgon.
- Sebei: Known as the Sabiny in Uganda, they reside on the northern slopes of Mount Elgon (approx. 300,000).

=== Tanzanian and Ancestral Clusters ===
- Datooga: An ancient Southern Nilotic cluster in Tanzania including the Barabaig, Gisamjanga, and Akie.
- Ogiek: The aboriginal hunter-gatherer group of the Mau Forest and Mount Kenya regions.
- Daasanach: An ancestrally related group residing in the Omo Valley of Ethiopia.

== Etymology and Modern Identity ==
The Kalenjin represent a unified cultural and linguistic collective, a primordial "Speech Community" known in the vernacular as Biikap Kuutiit. Originally classified by scholars and British colonial administrators as the "Nandi-speaking peoples," the Nandi and Kipsigis were historically the most prominent groups. Due to their military dominance and size during the early colonial period, their ethnonyms were frequently used by outsiders to represent the entire collective. The formal adoption of the name Kalenjin in the 1940s and 1950s was not the creation of a new identity, but rather the organic continuation and modern consolidation of ancient ancestral and linguistic bonds that have defined the southern Nilotic highland peoples for centuries.

=== National Recognition and Census Classification ===
This collective identity encompasses related sub-groups located primarily in the Rift Valley of Kenya, consisting of 17 tribes officially recognized in the KNBS census (Kipsigis, Nandi, Pokot, Sabaot, Keiyo, Tugen, Marakwet, Arror, Lembus, Ogiek, Endorois, Terik, Samor, Sengwer, Cherangany, Endo, and Senger). Additionally, 1,553,057 individuals ethnically identified "Kalenjin (So Stated)" category without specifying a particular sub-tribe, reflecting the consolidation of the unified Kalenjin identity per the 2019 Kenya National Bureau of Statistics (KNBS) report.

=== Regional and Cross-Border Distribution ===
The broader Kalenjin cultural and linguistic sphere extends across East Africa, including the Sebei (Sabiny) and Pokot of Uganda, and the Datooga clusters (such as the Barabaig and Akie) in Tanzania. Ancestrally related groups also include the Daasanach (Marille) of the Omo Valley in Ethiopia and northern Kenya.

=== Origins of the "Kalenjin" name ===
In 1944, a group of fourteen students at Alliance High School, led by Taaitta Arap Toweett, proposed and adopted the name "Kalenjin" (a Nandi expression meaning "I tell you") to foster solidarity. The term had gained currency during World War II through the influence of John Arap Chemallan, a prominent radio broadcaster who used "Kalenjin" (or the plural "Kalenjok") as a catchphrase for African soldiers. Nandi and Kipsigis servicemen began adopting the term as a collective identity on the battlefield. This identity was formally consolidated in 1948 with the founding of the Kalenjin Union in Eldoret.

The name "Kalenjin" is a Nandi expression meaning "I tell you" had already gained currency during World War II through the influence of John Arap Chemallan. A prominent radio broadcaster, Chemallan frequently used "Kalenjin" (or the plural "Kalenjok") as a catchphrase in his vernacular programmes for African soldiers. His popularity was so significant that Nandi and Kipsigis servicemen began adopting the term as a collective identity on the battlefield. This burgeoning identity was formally consolidated in 1948 with the founding of the Kalenjin Union in Eldoret. That same year, due to his leadership and literacy, Chemallan was nominated by Governor Philip Mitchell to the Legislative Council (LegCo) to represent the Rift Valley, later serving as a Parliamentary Secretary for Agriculture. According to Yale University's eHRAF World Cultures, this shift from external classification to internal self-identity better represents the organic linguistic and ancestral relationships of the Southern Nilotic peoples.

Ethnographic Records: Yale University's eHRAF World Cultures provides an Okiek/Kalenjin summary that explains the linguistic relationships and the former "Nandi-speaking" classification used by colonial administrators.

== Linguistic Landscape and Dialect Clusters ==
The Kalenjin languages constitute the southern branch of the Nilotic family's Southern Nilotic subgroup. This linguistic bond is the foundational pillar of the Biikap Kuutiit (People of the Mouth), reflecting an ancient shared heritage that predates modern administrative labels.

The collective is divided into several distinct but mutually intelligible dialect clusters, which were historically used by scholars to classify the "Nandi-speaking peoples":

- The Highland Cluster: Comprising the Kipsigis, Nandi, Keiyo, Tugen, Marakwet, and Terik.
- The Elgon Cluster: Including the Sabaot (Bungoma/Trans-Nzoia) and the Sebei (Sabiny) of Uganda.
- The Northern Cluster: Represented primarily by the Pokot (Kenya/Uganda), which exhibits the most significant linguistic divergence from the southern clusters.

Despite these regional variations, the "modern consolidation" of the 1940s was largely driven by the high degree of lexical similarity across these groups, allowing for the unified "Kalenjin" identity to be broadcast effectively through vernacular radio by John Arap Chemallan.Rottland, Franz (1982). Die Südnilotischen Sprachen. Dietrich Reimer.

== Y-DNA ==
A weighted analysis of Y-chromosome data across Kalenjin subgroups reveals a complex paternal landscape. The most frequent paternal lineage observed was Haplogroup E1b1b (M35), found in 32.6% of the studied Kalenjin men; this marker is associated with Afro-Asiatic (Cushitic) influence and indicates significant historical contact with Southern Cushitic populations in the Rift Valley. The second most prevalent lineage was Haplogroup E-M41, observed in 30.3% of the samples, which serves as a primary genetic marker for Highland Nilotic groups also common among the Nilo-Saharan populations of Ethiopia.16.0% of tested Kalenjin men carried Haplogroup E-M2, a lineage dominant among Bantu-speaking populations, suggesting substantial intermarriage and gene flow with neighboring Bantu groups. Furthermore, Haplogroup B-M60 was observed in 9.1% of the samples, representing ancient indigenous hunter-gatherer lineages, while Haplogroup A-M13 (A3b2), common among other Nilotic peoples like the Maasai and Dinka, was found in 5.7% of the Kalenjin participants. Smaller frequencies of E-P2 (4.6%) and F-M89 (1.7%) were also recorded (Add source to these claims).

Avoidance of Unverified Precision: Because published Y-DNA frequencies vary sharply across individual Kalenjin subgroups depending on whether they border Bantu or Cushitic neighbors, listing a single set of exact numbers without that caveat would overstate the precision of the current academic record.

Possible source:

Hirbo, Jibril Boru. "Complex Genetic History of East African Human Populations". Dissertation. Departments of Biology, University of Maryland, College Park. Page 202, 206

Marakwet:

• 10% A3b2,

• 5% B2a1, 5% B2b*, 10% B2b1, 10% B2b2,

• 25% E2a

• 5% E3b1a1, 5% E3b1a3, 35% E3b6

Pokot:

• 13.2% A3b2

• 10.5% B2a1, 2.6% B2a3, 2.6% B2b*

• 31.6% E2a, 2.6% E3*

• 2.6% e3b1a1, 2.6% e3b5, 18.4% e3b6,

Sabaot:

• 9.2% E2a,

• 36.3% E3a7, 4.5% E3a8, 9.1% E3a8a*

• 4.5% e3b1a1, 36.4% e3b6

Sengwer:

• 3.4% A3b2,

• 17.2% B2a1

• 37.9% E2a,

• 3.4% E3a7

• 13.8% e3b1a1, 20.7% e3b6,

Tugen:

• 2.9% A3b2

• 55.9% E2a, 5.9% E2b,

• 8.8% E3a7

• 17.6% E3, 5.9% E3b6

== Contributions to the Republic of Kenya ==
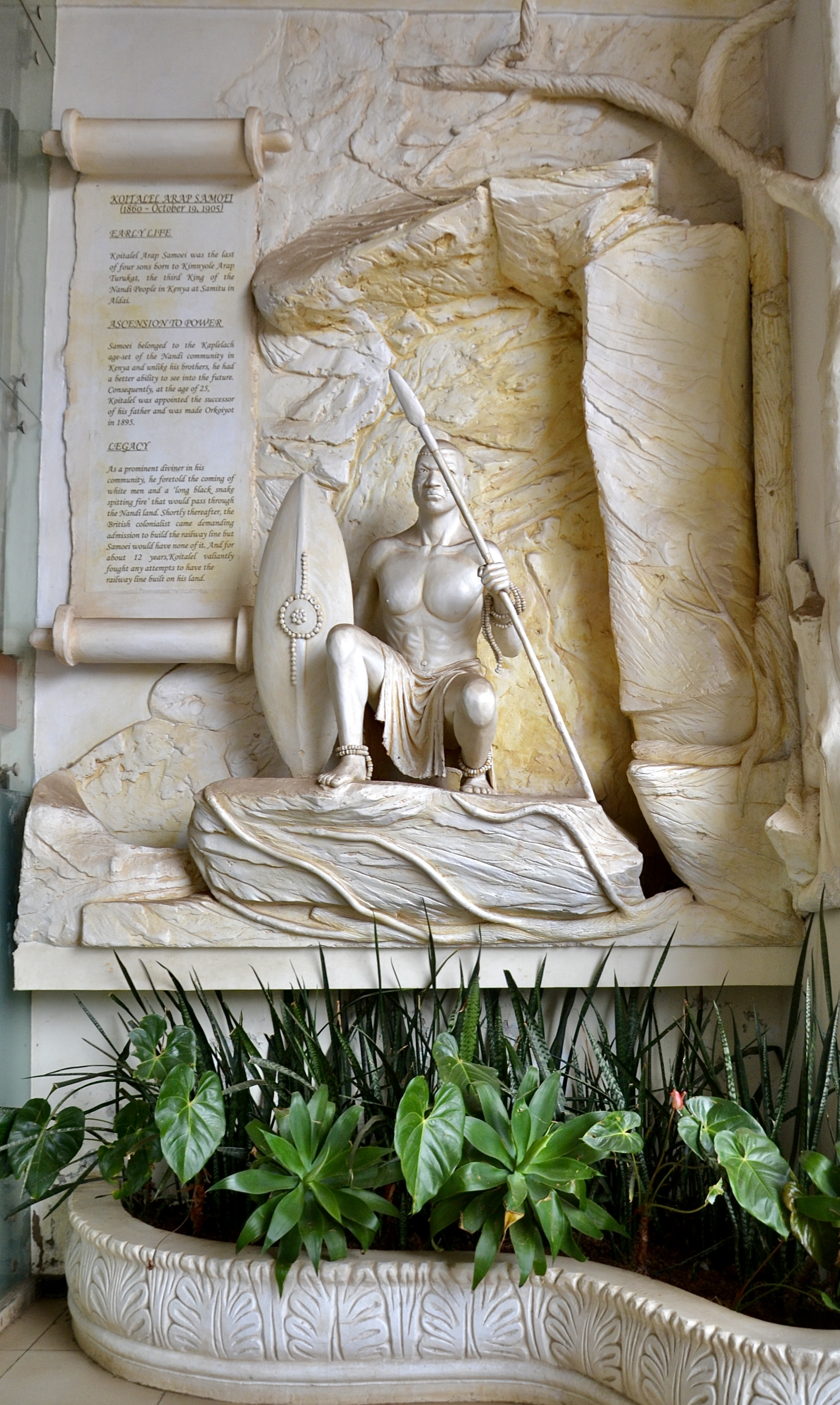
A statue of Koitalel Arap Samoei, the Kalenjin leader who spearheaded one of Kenya's earliest, longest and most effective military resistances against British colonial rule.

The Kalenjin community plays a central role to the political and economic development of Kenya characterized by leadership, economic stewardship of the Rift Valley region, and unparalleled global representation in sports. Historically, the Kalenjin under Orkoiyot Koitalel Arap Samoei led a fierce armed resistance against British colonial rule in East Africa, utilizing guerrilla tactics to sabotage the construction of the Uganda Railway and delaying effective colonial administration for over a decade (1895–1905). In Kenya's post-independence era, the Kalenjin maintain a significant presence in the National Police Service and the Kenya Defence Forces (KDF). Politically, the community has influenced Kenya through the presidency of Daniel arap Moi, Kenya's longest-serving head of state for 24.4 years (1978–2002), and the current administration of President William Ruto. Economically, they engage in large-scale commercial agriculture in maize, wheat, and dairy, while also controlling vast tea estates that contribute to Kenya's export economy.

Culturally, the Kalenjin are synonymous with Kenya's global identity in athletics, consistently producing world-record holders and Olympic champions that have represented Kenya on the international stage in long-distance running. Kenya is a known worldwide for her athletic prowess.

== Recent history ==
=== Demographics ===
According to Kenya's 2019 census, Kalenjin people number 6,358,113 individuals, making it the third-largest ethnic group in Kenya after the Kikuyu and the Luhya.

==== Subdivisions ====
There are several ethnic groups within the Kalenjin: They include the Keiyo, Endorois, Kipsigis, Marakwet, Nandi, Pokot, Terik, Tugens, Sengwer (Cherengany), Lembus and Sabaot.

=== Economic activity ===
The Kalenjin community contributes significantly to the Kenyan economy, primarily through leadership in agriculture, global sports tourism, and public sector representation. Their economic footprint is most visible in the Rift Valley region of Kenya, where they engage in a mix of large-scale commercial farming and pastoralism, providing a steady supply of beef and dairy products to the national market. As farmers, they cultivate grains such as maize and wheat and, to a lesser extent, sorghum and millet or practice a pastoralist lifestyle; rearing beef, goats and sheep for meat production. Equally large numbers practice a combination of both farming and livestock (often dairy cattle) rearing. The counties of Uasin Gishu, Trans Nzoia and Nakuru are often referred to as Kenya's grain-basket counties and are responsible for supplying much of the country's grain requirements. The Kalenjin-dominated counties are known as Kenya's "grain basket" for their massive production of maize and wheat. As Global Export Earners, The Kale community is central to the tea industry, particularly in the Kericho and Nandi highlands, which helps maintain Kenya's status as a leading global tea exporter.

Meat products from the northern areas of West Pokot and Baringo are particularly appreciated for their flavor and are favored in the Rift for the preparation of nyama choma.

A significant number of Kalenjin have moved to Kenya's cities where large numbers are employed in the Kenyan Government, the Army, Police Force, the banking and finance industry as well as in business.

=== Politics ===
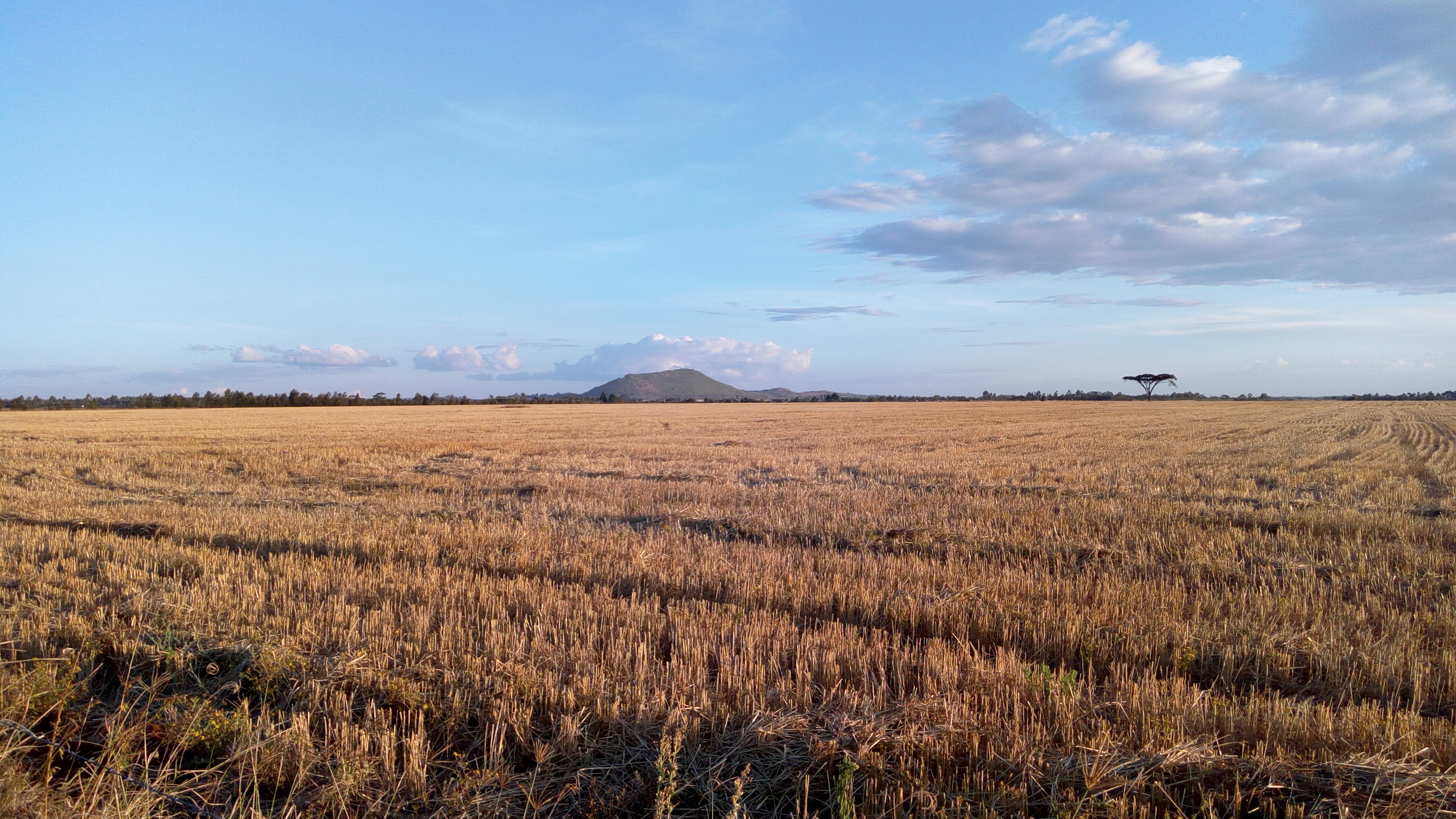
Wheat plantation in Uasin Gishu

Since the establishment of the Republic in 1964, the Kenyan presidency has been held exclusively by individuals from the Kikuyu and Kalenjin ethnic groups. While Kenya comprises over 40 distinct ethnic groups, including the populous Luo, Luhya, and Kamba communities, none of these groups have held the executive office to date. This concentration of executive power has led to sustained national debate regarding ethnic inclusivity and the equitable distribution of state resources.

The Kalenjin community has produced two presidents: Daniel arap Moi (a Tugen), who served as the nation's second and longest-tenured president for 24 years (1978–2002), and the incumbent, Dr. William Ruto (a mixed Kipsigis/Nandi). Due to the 2010 Constitution of Kenya, which imposes a two-term limit on the presidency, Moi's record as the longest-serving head of state remains unique in Kenya's political history. This historical dominance has established the Kikuyu and Kalenjin as the primary architects of the country's post-colonial political landscape.

In 2007, a disputed presidential election in Kenya triggered a two-month political crisis marked by widespread violence, resulting in the deaths of over a thousand people and the displacement of nearly seven hundred thousand. Much of the unrest unfolded along ethnic lines, particularly in the Rift Valley, where members of various communities—including Kalenjin warriors—were involved in attacks and reprisals. According to Gabrielle Lynch (2011), what distinguishes this episode from other instances of ethnic conflict is the relatively recent formation of the broader Kalenjin identity, because the collective ethnonym 'Kalenjin' did not exist before 1940 though the community remained culturally and linguistically connected.

== Culture ==
The Kalenjin have a long history of nomadic herding, though many groups especially the highland Kipsigis and Nandi now rely on farming. Contemporary Kalenjin culture is a product of its heritage, the suite of cultural adoptions of the British colonial period and modern Kenyan identity from which it borrows and adds to.

=== Language ===
The Kalenjin speak Kalenjin languages as mother tongues. The language grouping belongs to the Nilotic family. The majority of Kalenjin speakers are found in Kenya with smaller populations in Tanzania (e.g., Akie) and Uganda (e.g., Kupsabiny).

Kiswahili and English, Kenyan national and official languages respectively, are widely spoken as second and third languages by most Kalenjin speakers and as first and second languages by some Kalenjin.

=== Names ===
Kalenjin names are primarily used by the Kalenjin people of Kenya and Kalenjin language-speaking communities such as the Sebei of Uganda and the Akie of Tanzania.

The Kalenjin traditionally had two primary names for the individual though in contemporary times a Christian or Arabic name is also given at birth such that most Kalenjin today have three names with the patronym Arap in some cases being acquired later in life e.g. Alfred Kirwa Yego and Daniel Toroitch arap Moi.

=== Customs ===
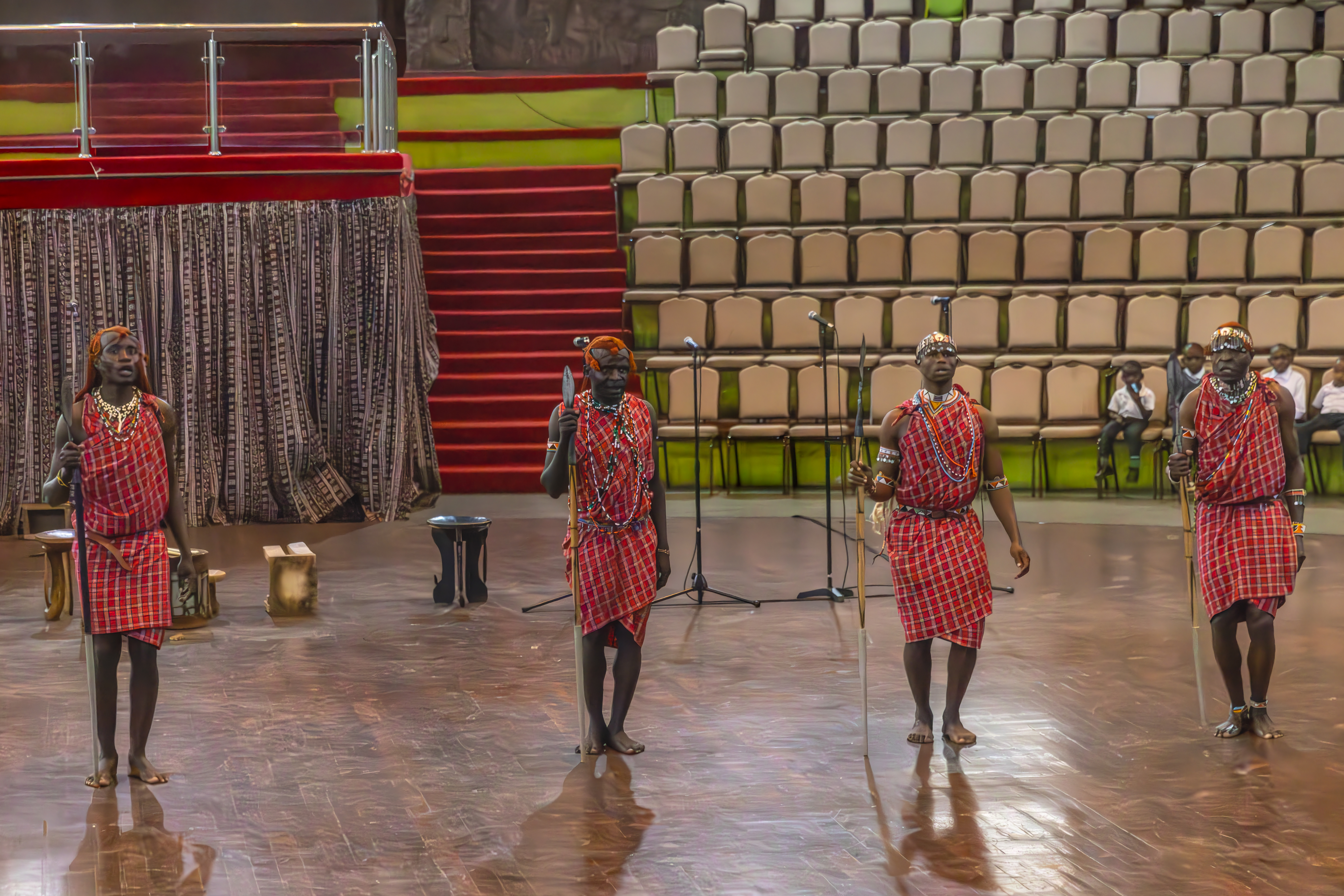

==== Initiation ====
The initiation process is a key component of Kalenjin identity. Among males, the circumcision (yatitaet) and initiation (tumdo) process is seen as signifying one's transition from boyhood to manhood and is taken very seriously. On the whole, the process still occurs during a boys pre-teen/early teenage years though significant differences are emerging in practice. Much esotericism is still attended to in the traditional practice of initiation and there was great uproar amongst Kalenjin elders in 2013 when aspects of the tradition were openly inquired into at the International Court. Conversely a number of contemporary Kalenjin have the circumcision process carried out in hospital as a standard surgical procedure and various models of the learning process have emerged to complement the modern practice. For orthodox, urban and Christian traditions the use of ibinwek is in decline and the date has been moved from the traditional September/October festive season to December to coincide with the Kenyan school calendar.

The female circumcision process is perceived negatively in the modern world (see: FGM) and various campaigns are being carried out with the intention of eradicating the practice among the Kalenjin. A notable anti-FGM crusader is Hon. Linah Jebii Kilimo.

==== Marriage ====
The contemporary Kalenjin wedding has fewer ceremonies than it did traditionally and they often, though not always, occur on different days;

During the first ceremony, the proposal/show-up (kaayaaet'ap koito), the young man who wants to marry, informs his parents of his intention and they in turn tell their relatives often as part of discussing suitability of the pairing. If they approve, they will go to the girls family for a show-up and to request for the girl's hand in marriage. The parents are usually accompanied by aunts, uncles or even grandparents and the request is often couched as an apology to the prospective brides parents for seeking to take their daughter away from them. If her family agrees to let them have their daughter, a date for a formal engagement is agreed upon. Other than initiating it, the intended groom and prospective bride play no part in this ceremony.

During the second ceremony, the formal engagement (koito), the bridegroom's family goes to the bride's home to officially meet her family. The groom's family which includes aunts, uncles, grandparents, etc. are invited into a room for extensive introductions and dowry negotiations. After the negotiations, a ceremony is held where the bridegroom and bride are given advice on family life by older relatives from both families. Usually, symbolic gifts and presents are given to the couple during this ceremony. The koito is usually quite colorful and sometimes bears resemblance to a wedding ceremony and it is indeed gaining prominence as the key event since the kaayaaet'ap koito is sometimes merged with it and at other times the tunisiet is foregone in favor of it.

The third ceremony, the wedding (tunisiet), is a big ceremony whereas many relations, neighbors, friends and business partners are invited. In modern iterations, this ceremony often follows the pattern of a regular Western wedding; it is usually held in church, where rings are exchanged, is officiated by a pastor and followed by a reception.

=== Religion ===
Almost all modern Kalenjin are members of an organised religion with the vast majority being Christian and a few identifying as Muslim.

=== Elders ===
The Kalenjin have a council of elders composed of members of the various Kalenjin clans and sub-clans and known as the Myoot Council of Elders. This council was formed in the Kenyan post-independence period.

=== Folklore ===
Like all oral societies, the Kalenjin developed a rich collection of folklore. Folk narratives were told to pass on a message and a number featured the Chemosit, known in Marakwet as Chebokeri, the dreaded monster that devoured the brains of disobedient children.

The Legend of Cheptalel is fairly common among the Kipsigis and Nandi and the name was adopted from Kalenjin mythology into modern tradition. The fall of the Long'ole Clan is another popular tale based on a true story and is told to warn against pride. In the story, the Long'ole warriors believing they were the mightiest in the land goaded their distant rivals the Maasai into battle. The Maasai, though at first reluctant eventually attacked wiping out the Long'ole clan.

As with other East African communities, the colonial period Misri myth has over time become popular among the Kalenjin and aspects of it have influenced the direction of folkloric and academic studies.

=== Arts & crafts ===
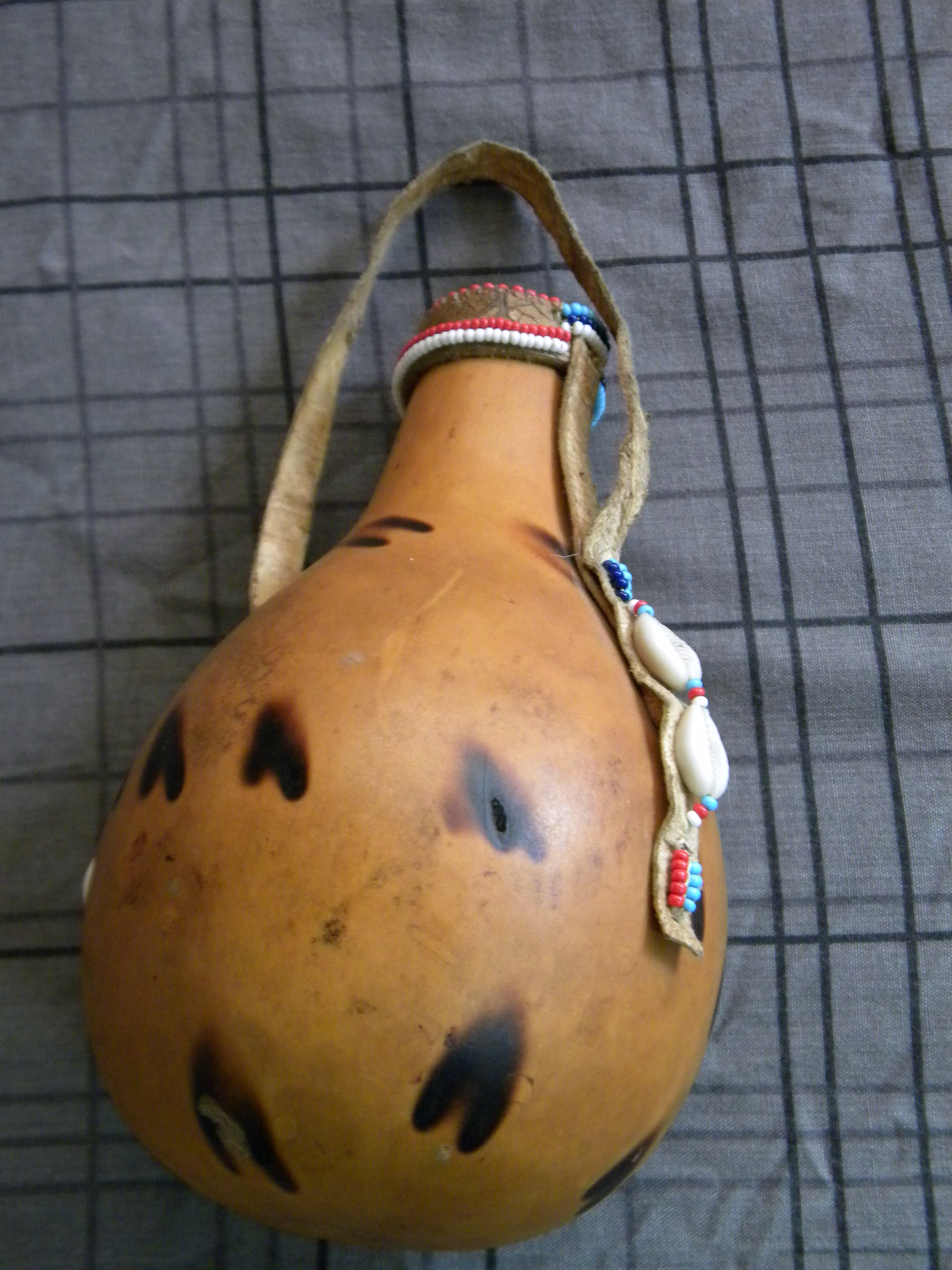
Sotet

The use of arts and crafts form part of Kalenjin culture with decorative bead-work being the most highly developed visual art. The Kalenjin are generally not well known for their handicraft's however, though women do make and locally sell decorated calabashes made from gourds. These gourd calabashes known as sotet are rubbed with oil and adorned with small colored beads and are essentially the same type of calabashes that are used for storing mursik.

=== Radio, television, and film ===
Up until the early 21st century, vernacular radio and television stations were essentially banned in Kenya. The liberalization of the media sector in Kenya which began in the 1990s has seen the growth of Kalenjin language content across most modern mediums. This period has seen the establishment of Kalenjin language media companies such as Kass Media Group, a Kenyan radio and television company, as well as Kalenjin language stations within diverse media groups e.g. Chamgei FM (Royal Media Services) and Kitwek FM (Kenya Broadcasting Corporation). There has been a concurrent proliferation of Kalenjin music, television programs and more recently the premier of the first Kalenjin language film, Ngebe Gaa, at the 2019 Eldoret Film Festival.

=== Music ===
Contemporary Kalenjin music has long been influenced by the Kipsigis leading to Kericho's perception as a cultural innovation center. Musical innovation and regional styles, however, abound across all Kalenjin speaking areas. Popular musicians include Pastor Joel Kimetto (father of Kalenjin Gospel), Mike Rotich, Emmy Kosgei, Maggy Cheruiyot, Josphat Koech Karanja, Lilian Rotich and Barbra Chepkoech. Msupa S and Kipsang represent an emerging generation of Kalenjin pop musicians. Notable stars who have passed on include Diana Chemutai Musila (Chelele), Junior Kotestes and Weldon Cheruiyot (Kenene).

=== Literature ===
A number of writers have documented Kalenjin history and culture, notably B. E. Kipkorir, Paul Kipchumba, and Ciarunji Chesaina.

=== Cuisine ===
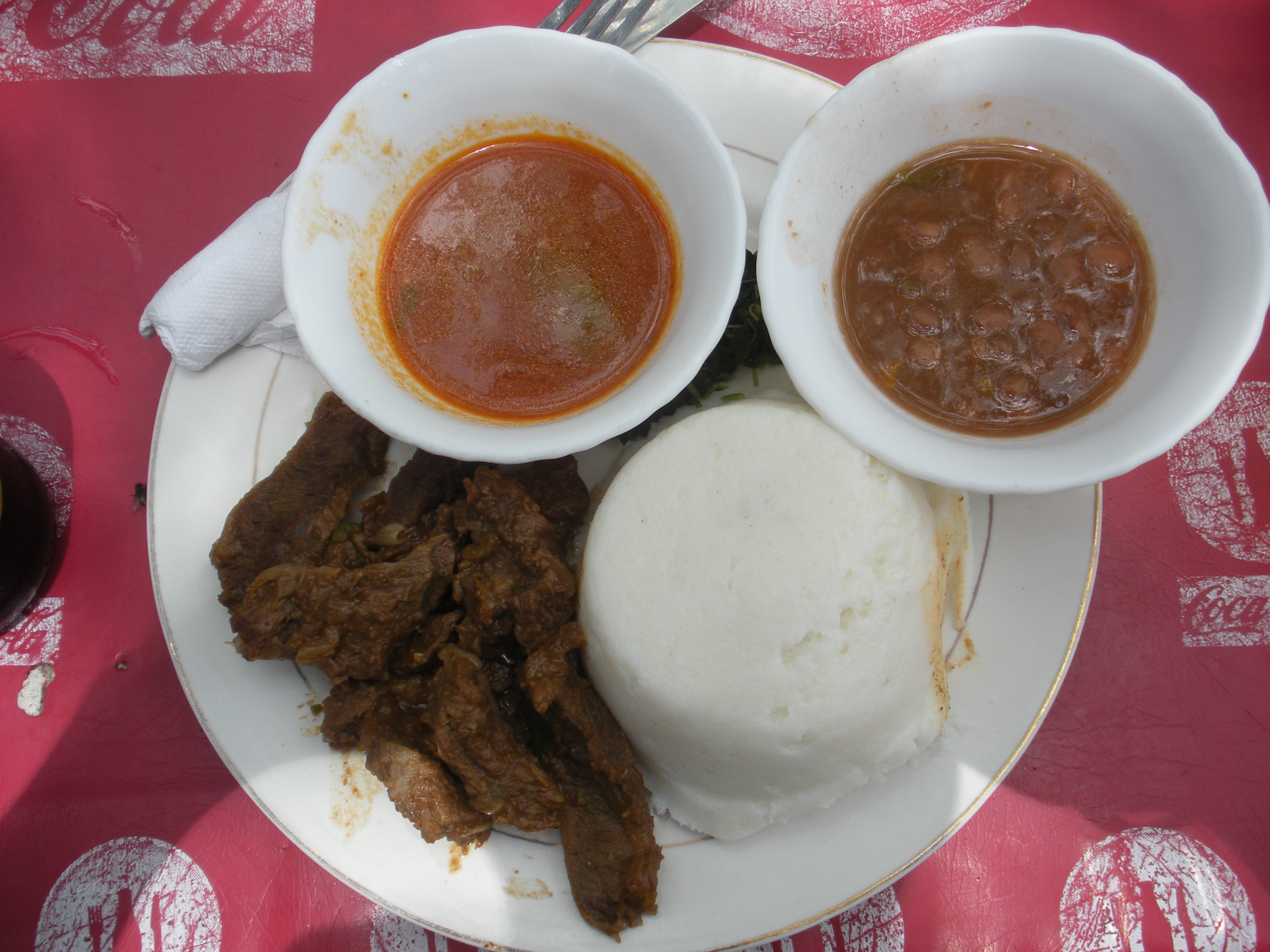
Ugali with beef and sauce is a common dish of Kalenjin and African Great Lakes cuisine.

Ugali, known in Kalenjin as kimnyet, served with cooked vegetables such as isageek (African cabbage) or sochot (African nightshade), and milk form the staples of the Kalenjin diet. Less often ugali, rice or chapati, is served with roast meat, usually beef or goat, and occasionally chicken. The traditional ugali is made of millet and sorghum and is known as psong'iot. It is considered healthier than ugali made of maize flour (similar to brown bread/white bread) and has seen a resurgence in popularity in tandem with global trends towards healthier eating. The traditional snack moriot (somewhat similar to corn tortillas) is obtained from the crust after cooking ugali and is still quite enjoyed. Similarly, the traditional drink mursik, and honey, both considered delicacies (karise/kariseyuek) for a long time remain quite popular.

Extensive use is made of dairy produce in traditional recipes such as socheek (a vegetable relish made with greens, milk and cream) as well as contemporary meals such as Mcheleng (rice with milk – a creamy smooth dish made as a delicacy for children but usually enjoyed by the entire family) and Bean stew with milk and cream.

Combination dishes/mixtures while not considered traditionally Kalenjin are encountered in more cosmopolitan areas. The most common of these is kwankwaniek, a mixture of maize and beans boiled together (githeri).

Milk or tea may be drunk by adults and children with any meal or snack. Tea (chaiik) averages 40% milk by volume and is usually liberally sweetened. If no milk is available tea may be drunk black with sugar though taking tea without milk is considered genuine hardship.

In addition to bread, people routinely buy foodstuffs such as sugar, tea leaves, cooking fat, sodas, and other items that they do not produce themselves.

=== Health & science ===
Traditional Kalenjin knowledge was fairly comprehensive in the study and usage of plants for medicinal purposes and a significant trend among some contemporary Kalenjin scientists is the study of this aspect of traditional knowledge. In more recent times, commercial enterprises have started blending and packaging traditional herbal remedies for the urban Kenyan market. Most noted of these is Harriet's Botanicals which packages Arorwet and Tendwet alternative remedies and distributes them via a number of shops spread across the country.

One of the more notable Kalenjin scientists is Prof Richard Mibey whose work on the Tami dye helped revive the textile industry in Eldoret and western Kenya in general.

=== Sport ===
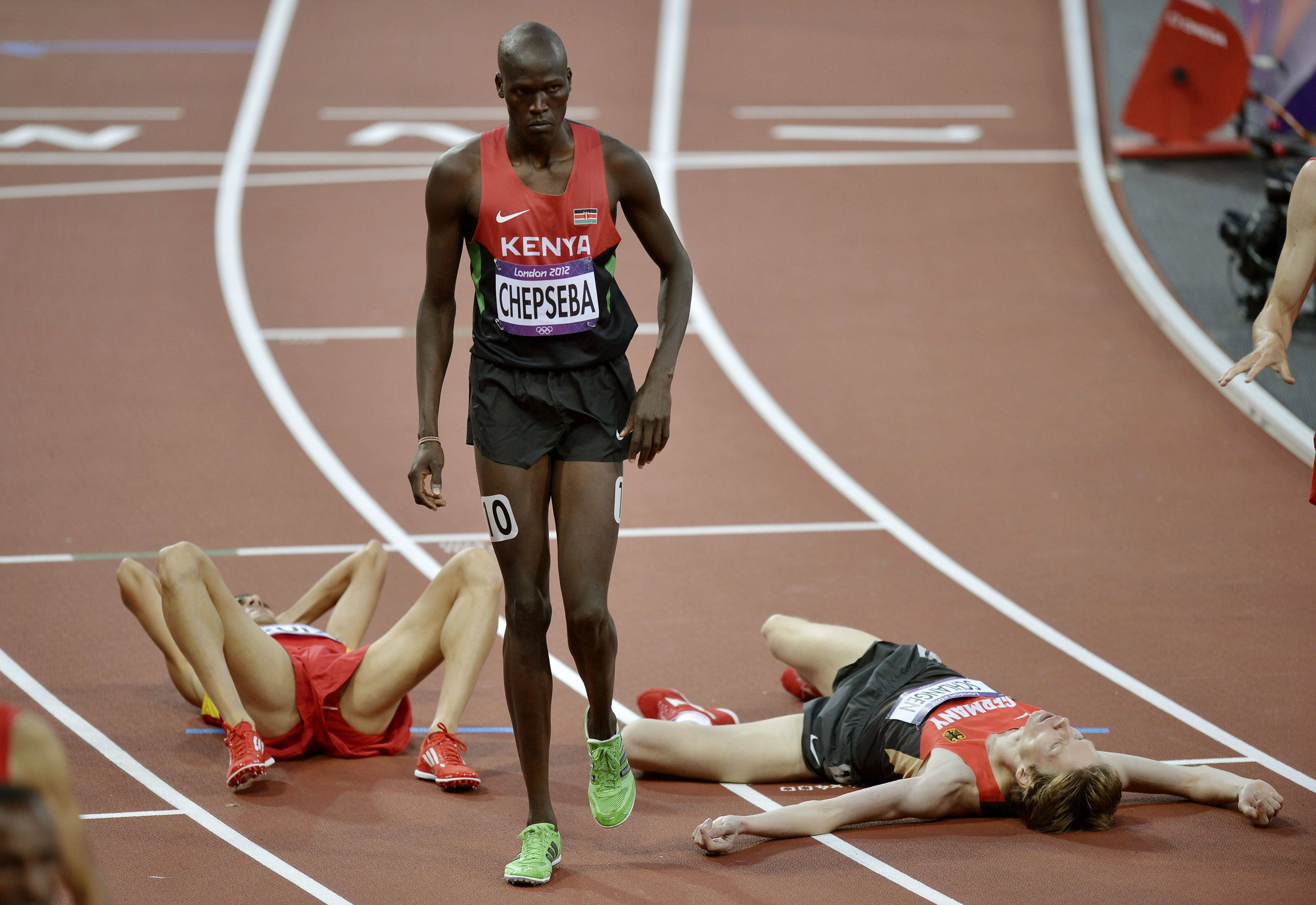
Nixon Kiplimo Chepseba (C) of Kenya steps over Diego Ruiz (L) of Spain and Carsten Schlangen of Germany after their round 1 men's 1500m heat during the London 2012 Olympics

The Kalenjin have been called by some "the running tribe." Since the mid-1960s, Kenyan men have earned the largest share of major honours in international athletics at distances from 800 meters to the marathon; the vast majority of these Kenyan running stars have been Kalenjin. From 1980 on, about 40% of the top honours available to men in international athletics at these distances (Olympic medals, World Championships medals, and World Cross Country Championships honours) have been earned by Kalenjin.

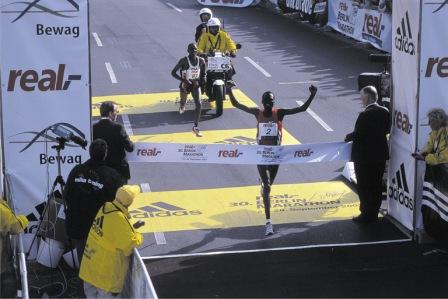
Paul Tergat set a new world record to the marathon at Berlin, 2003.

In 2008, Pamela Jelimo became the first Kenyan woman to win a gold medal at the Olympics; she also became the first Kenyan to win the Golden League jackpot in the same year. Since then, Kenyan women have become a major presence in international athletics at the distances; most of these women are Kalenjin. Amby Burfoot of Runner's World stated that the odds of Kenya achieving the success they did at the 1988 Olympics were below 1:160 billion. Kenya had an even more successful Olympics in 2008.

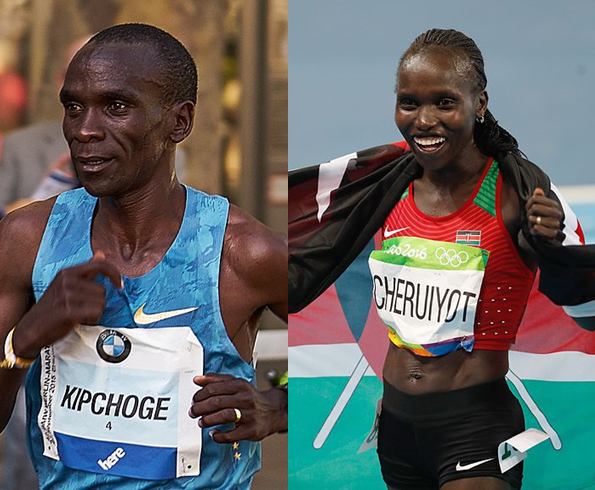
The Kalenjin people are renowned for their dominance in athletics specifically long-distance running, which has resulted in numerous accolades for Kenya, including Olympic and World Championship medals in both track events and cross country competitions.

A number of theories explaining the unusual athletic prowess among people from the Kalenjin-speaking people have been proposed. These include many explanations that apply equally well to other Kenyans or people living elsewhere who are not disproportionately successful athletes, such as that they run to school every day, that they live at relatively high altitude, and that the prize money from races is large compared to typical yearly earnings. One theory is that the Kalenjin have relatively thin legs and therefore do not have to lift as much leg weight when running long distances.

== Notable Kalenjin people ==
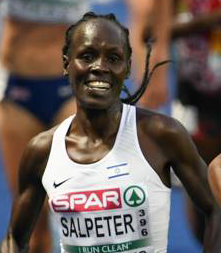
Lonah Chemtai Salpeter

- Daniel arap Moi (1924–2020), second President of Kenya (Longest-serving president in Kenya)
- William Samoei Ruto, fifth president of Kenya
- Eliud Kipchoge, two-time Olympic marathon champion & former world record holder for men's marathon
- Willy Bett, former Cabinet Secretary in the Ministry of Agriculture, Livestock and Fisheries
- Paul Bitok, two-time Olympic silver medalist in the 5,000 m (1992 and 1996)
- Mike Boit, Professor, Kenya's first Commissioner for Sport and Olympic bronze medalist in the 800 m (1972)
- Amos Biwott, winner of the 3000 metres steeplechase at the 1968 summer Olympic Games
- Nicholas Biwott (1940–2017), politician
- Jonathan Bii, Governor of Uasin Gishu County
- Vivian Cheruiyot, Kenyan long-distance runner
- Emmanuel Chemengich, Anglican Bishop of Kitale
- Joyce Chepchumba, Kenyan long distance athlete
- Joshua Cheptegei, 10,000 m world champion (Uganda)
- Joyciline Jepkosgei, Kenyan female long-distance runner
- Priscah Jeptoo, Kenyan long-distance runner
- Ben Jipcho, Olympic silver medalist in the 3000 metres steeplechase, 1972 Summer Olympic Games
- Kipchoge Keino (born 1940), former 1500 m world record holder
- Mary Jepkosgei Keitany, former professional long-distance runner
- Ezekiel Kemboi, multiple world and Olympic 3000 m steeplechase champion
- Jonathan Kimetet arap Ng'eno, 4th Speaker of the National Assembly of Kenya
- Emmanuel Kipchirchir Mutai, Kenyan long-distance runner
- Wilson Kipketer, multiple world champion and world record holder in 800 meter
- Edna Kiplagat, Kenyan professional long-distance runner
- Moses Kiprono arap Keino, 3rd Speaker of the National Assembly of Kenya
- Amos Kipruto, Kenyan long-distance runner
- Chris Kiptoo, Principal Secretary for National Treasury in Kenya
- Kelvin Kiptum (1999–2024), world men's marathon record holder between 2023 and 2026
- Faith Kipyegon, 1500 m world and Olympic running champion; record holder in 1500 m, mile, and 5000 m
- Timothy Kitum, Kenyan middle-distance runner
- Benjamin Kogo, Kenyan athlete
- Betty Korir, Kenyan lawyer and corporate executive, Credit Bank
- Cornelius Korir, Catholic Bishop of the Diocese of Eldoret
- Paul Korir, inaugural Anglican Bishop of Kapsabet
- Brigid Kosgei, record holder in women's marathon
- Pamela Kosgei, Kenyan track and field and cross-country athlete
- Sally Kosgei, former Minister for Higher Education in Kenya
- Felix Koskei, Head of Public Service (Kenya)
- Joyce Laboso, Governor of Bomet County, Kenya
- Martin Lel, Kenyan professional long distance and marathon runner
- Felix Limo, former long-distance runner
- Paul Malakwen Kosgei, Kenyan long-distance runner and marathoner
- Jackson Mandago, first Governor of Uasin Gishu County
- Paul Masaba, Anglican Bishop of Sebei
- Gideon Moi, former Kenyan Senator, Baringo County
- Mercy Moim, Kenyan volleyball player
- Alexander Muge, former Anglican Bishop of the Diocese of Eldoret
- Kipchumba Murkomen, Cabinet Secretary, Ministry of Interior & National Administration of Kenya
- Ernest Ng'eno, Anglican Bishop of Kericho
- Henry Rotich, former Cabinet Secretary for National Treasury (Kenya)
- Wisley Rotich, Governor of Elgeyo Marakwet County
- Rachel Ruto, First Lady of Kenya
- Isaac Ruto, first Governor of Bomet County
- Lonah Chemtai Salpeter (born 1988), Kenyan-born Israeli Olympic marathon runner
- Koitalel Arap Samoei, the Orkoiyot and leader of the Nandi resistance against British colonialism
- Patrick Sang, Kenyan running coach
- Jemima Sumgong, Kenyan long-distance runner
- Taaitta Toweett, former Minister of Education, Kenya
- John Kipchumba Tanui, visionary leader driving Kenya's Cyber space. (Principal Secretary, State Department for ICT and Digital Economy)
- Oscar Kipchumba Sudi, member of the Kenyan National Assembly representing Kapseret constituency
- Aaron Kipkirui Cheruiyot, Majority Leader of the senate, senator for Kericho County

== Kalenjin's in diaspora ==
The Kalenjin diaspora numbers in North America is approx. ~20,000 residents across the USA and Canada, is primarily organized under Gotabgaa International, a national organization founded in 1993 by Prof. John Rugutt and Amb. Peter Rono. Dedicated to inspiring, connecting, and economically empowering its members through education, networking, and cultural awareness, Gotabgaa operates registered chapters in states with significant populations, including Minnesota, Texas (Dallas and Houston), Kansas (Kansas City and Wichita), North Carolina, Oklahoma, Wisconsin, Ohio, Iowa, and the Washington D.C. area.

Australia is the second leading continent for the Kalenjin diaspora, with an estimated population of 15,000+ residents primarily concentrated in , Western Australia. Most Kalenjin's in Australia live in the city called Perth, which serves as the community's national headquarters. The community is unified through the Kitwek Association Inc, a registered community-based organization dedicated to fostering positive integration, celebrating cultural heritage, and supporting the welfare of Kalenjin migrants across Australia. Through initiatives like "Kitwek Connect" and annual gala events, the association strengthens social bonds and provides essential networking opportunities for its members. Kalenjin people in the diaspora are also located in regions such as Victoria (Melbourne), New South Wales (Sydney), Queensland (Brisbane), and South Australia (Adelaide).

== See also ==
- Kalenjin languages
- History of the Kalenjin people
- Kalenjin folklore
- Kalenjin culture
- Nandi Resistance
- Koitalel Arap Samoei

== Bibliography ==
- Evans-Pritchard, E.E. (1965) 'The political structure of the Nandi-speaking peoples of Kenya', in The position of women in primitive societies and other essays in social anthropology, pp. 59–75.
- https://www.amazon.de/Kalenjin-Grammar-Beginners-Complete-Textbook-ebook/dp/B09VLL15M7
- Entine, Jon. (2000) 'The Kenya Connection', in TABOO: Why Black Athletes Dominate Sports And Why We're Afraid to Talk About It. https://web.archive.org/web/20081209004844/http://www.jonentine.com/reviews/quokka_03.htm
- Kipchumba Foundation (2017) Aspects of Indigenous Religion among the Marakwet of Kenya, Nairobi: Kipchumba Foundation, ISBN 978-1-9732-0939-3 ISBN 1-9732-0939-X
- Omosule, Monone (1989). "Kalenjin: the emergence of a corporate name for the 'Nandi-speaking tribes' of East Africa". Genève-Afrique. 27 (1): 73–88.
- Sutton, J.E.G. (1978) 'The Kalenjin', in Ogot, B.A. (ed.) Kenya before 1900, pp. 21–52.
- Larsen, Henrik B. (2002) 'Why Are Kenyan Runners Superior? '
- Tanser, Toby (2008) More Fire. How to Run the Kenyan Way.
- Warner, Gregory (2013) 'How One Kenyan Tribe Produces The World's Best Runners'
