= Kalenjin culture =

Contemporary Kalenjin culture is a product of its heritage, the suite of cultural adoptions of the British colonial period and modern Kenyan identity from which it borrows and adds to.

== Norms & lifestyle ==
Maintaining peace and amity, especially between relations, is particularly important for the Kalenjin and ranks high on their scale of values. This type of peaceful relationship is known as Tiliet and is rooted in ancient Kalenjin culture. It is the root word of Tilionutik a person's wider relationship circle.

== Customs ==
The Kalenjin, like most other Kenyan and East African communities will usually shake hands when exchanging greetings. It is considered important to demonstrate respect for an elder or someone of higher social status by supporting the right forearm with the left while shaking hands.

Hospitality to guests is very important and it is quite customary to offer tea, snacks and entertainment even to unexpected visitors. The magnanimity often reflects the closeness and/or status of those involved.

== Cuisine ==
Pastoral culture has contributed significantly to Kalenjin cuisine; mursik, a fermented milk delicacy, is emblematic of Kalenjin culture as a whole and is still quite appreciated in contemporary times. Roast meat particularly beef, goat and less often mutton, known as nyama choma in Kenya, has long been a key feature of Kalenjin celebrations and get-togethers, most famously the Kipsundet roast in olden times which involved the use of four different and specific types of wood to fuel the fire.

The Kalenjin generally grow and prepare grains, principally maize, as the main starch with the accompaniments being served onto individual plates from a central serving dish. The accompaniments usually comprise vegetable relishes though meat stews and roasts are had on occasion.

Ever since the colonial period; sitting on a chair while eating at a table has become customary. Eating with the hands and using a knife, fork and spoon are both practiced and are largely determined by the meal and setting. Having a meal together and sharing food between members of the family has also become very much the norm.

== Birth traditions and beliefs ==
Traditional principles concerning pregnancy and childbirth are largely influenced by folk beliefs, especially in rural areas. Modern practices follow the Western medical model.

== Coming of age ==
=== Initiation ===
The initiation process is a key component of Kalenjin identity. Among males, the circumcision (yatitaet) and initiation (tumdo) process is seen as signifying one's transition from boyhood to manhood and is taken very seriously. Linguistic modelling suggests that the Southern Nilotes practiced circumcision as part of initiation rites into adulthood by the early first millennium A.D., a custom likely influenced by contact with Eastern Cushitic speakers. This timeline corresponds with early Arab interactions with the medieval Nubian kingdoms of, as well as proposed periods of Southern Nilotic migration southward from that region.

On the whole, the process still occurs during a boys pre-teen/early teenage years though significant differences are emerging in practice. Much esotericism is still attended to in the traditional practice of initiation and there was great uproar amongst Kalenjin elders in 2013 when aspects of the tradition were openly inquired into at the International Court. Conversely a number of contemporary Kalenjin have the circumcision process carried out in hospital as a standard surgical procedure and various models of the learning process have emerged to complement the modern practice. For orthodox, urban and Christian traditions the use of ibinwek is in decline and the date has been moved from the traditional September/October festive season to December to coincide with the Kenyan school calendar.

The female circumcision process is perceived negatively in the modern world and various campaigns are being carried out with the intention of eradicating the practice among the Kalenjin. A notable anti-FGM crusader is Hon. Linah Jebii Kilimo.

== Marriage ==
The contemporary Kalenjin wedding has fewer ceremonies than it did traditionally and they often, though not always, occur on different days;

During the first ceremony, the proposal/show-up (kaayaaet'ap koito), the young man who wants to marry, informs his parents of his intention and they in turn tell their relatives often as part of discussing suitability of the pairing. If they approve, they will go to the girl's family for a show-up and to request for the girl's hand in marriage. The parents are usually accompanied by aunts, uncles or even grandparents and the request is often couched as an apology to the prospective bride's parents for seeking to take their daughter away from them. If her family agrees to let them have their daughter, a date for a formal engagement is agreed upon. Other than initiating it, the intended groom and prospective bride play no part in this ceremony.

During the second ceremony, the formal engagement (koito), the bridegroom's family goes to the bride's home to officially meet her family. The groom's family which includes aunts, uncles, grandparents, etc. is invited into a room for extensive introductions and dowry negotiations. After the negotiations, a ceremony is held where the bridegroom and bride are given advice on family life by older relatives from both families. Usually, symbolic gifts and presents are given to the couple during this ceremony. The koito is usually quite colorful and sometimes bears resemblance to a wedding ceremony and it is indeed gaining prominence as the key event since the kaayaaet'ap koito is sometimes merged with it and at other times the tunisiet is foregone in favor of it.

The third ceremony, the wedding (tunisiet), is a big ceremony whereas many relations, neighbors, friends and business partners are invited. In modern iterations, this ceremony often follows the pattern of a regular Western wedding; it is usually held in church, where rings are exchanged, is officiated by a pastor and followed by a reception.

== Arts ==
=== Traditional arts ===
Kalenjin visual arts are traditionally heavily influenced by the practice of applique beadwork, with beadwork from different regions displaying a number of distinctive styles.

=== Dance ===
Traditional Kalenjin dances included structured performances such as the kambakta (a warriors dance performed during the eponymous event) and sondoiyo (an old peoples dance).

Today, modern dance styles influenced by Kenyan, African and American trends tend to be the norm with the traditional styles largely confined to cultural events such as weddings and cultural performances at the Kenya Music Festivals and at cultural venues such as Bomas of Kenya.

=== Music ===
Kalenjin music includes folk music traditions as well as contemporary pop music. Traditional music played on the sukutit drum and the various stringed lyres is quite rare and is played only at cultural events and venues.

Contemporary Kalenjin music derives from the benga sound whose defining feature involves playing the guitar principally by plucking as opposed to strumming the strings. The sound arose from the transition from traditional African stringed instruments which were played by plucking to western stringed instruments. The first of the Kenyan communities to develop the sound were the Luo community. Though there were earlier experiments and developments, the major shift occurred soon after the end of the Second World War when a handful of demobilized soldiers who had been conscripted from Luoland arrived back home with an instrument that would herald new practices of entertainment amongst their people—the Spanish guitar.

The veteran music producer and retailer A.P. Chandarana set up base in the town of Kericho, which lies in the lush tea-growing regions east of the Rift Valley. It was at his studios that a vast number of musicians from western Kenya first put their work on spool tapes. Chandarana's business acumen was in large part responsible for the replication of the Benga sound by singers from the mid-Rift Valley region. His shop and recording premises in the town are still in operation.

== Sports among the Kalenjin ==
=== Middle & long distance running ===
The Kalenjin have been called by some "the running tribe." Since the mid-1960s, Kenyan men have earned the largest share of major honors in international athletics at distances from 800 meters to the marathon; the vast majority of these Kenyan running stars have been Kalenjin. From 1980 on, about 40% of the top honors available to men in international athletics at these distances (Olympic medals, World Championships medals, and World Cross Country Championships honors) have been earned by Kalenjin.

In 2008, Pamela Jelimo became the first Kenyan woman to win a gold medal at the Olympics; she also became the first Kenyan to win the Golden Leaguejackpot in the same year. Since then, Kenyan women have become a major presence in international athletics at the distances; most of these women are Kalenjin. Amby Burfoot of Runner's World stated that the odds of Kenya achieving the success they did at the 1988 Olympics were below 1:160 billion. Kenya had an even more successful Olympics in 2008.

A number of theories explaining the unusual athletic prowess among people from the Kalenjin-speaking people have been proposed. These include many explanations that apply equally well to other Kenyans or people living elsewhere who are not disproportionately successful athletes, such as that they run to school every day, that they live at relatively high altitude, and that the prize money from races is large compared to typical yearly earnings. One theory is that the Kalenjin have relatively thin legs and therefore do not have to lift as much leg weight when running long distances.

This sustained athletic excellence has transformed Iten, a small town in Elgeyo-Marakwet County, into a global sports tourism destination known as the "Home of Champions." Iten attracts thousands of elite runners, coaches, and enthusiasts from around the world who seek to train at high altitude—about 2,400 meters above sea level—in the ideal environment that has produced countless Olympic and World Championship medalists. The influx of international athletes and visitors has fueled the growth of local industries including specialized sports training camps, fitness centers, accommodation services, and sports apparel businesses. This ecosystem has also attracted sports scientists and researchers investigating the physiological and environmental factors behind Kalenjin dominance in distance running. Beyond boosting the local economy, Iten's rise as a training hub has inspired youth participation and helped preserve running as a core cultural identity among the Kalenjin, creating a virtuous cycle of sporting excellence and community development.

=== Non-traditional sports ===
While the Kalenjin community is known for its presence in athletics, a number have ventured into new disciplines including—field events, martial arts, mountaineering, and team sports.

Among the most prominent is Julius Yego, a Kalenjin from Nandi County who made history as the first Kenyan to compete in javelin at the Olympics. In a sport long dominated by Europeans, Yego earned the nickname "Mr. YouTube" after teaching himself how to throw the javelin using online videos due to the absence of local coaches. His unconventional training methods led to global acclaim: Commonwealth gold in 2014, World Championship gold in 2015 (with an African record of 92.72 meters), and Olympic silver in 2016.

Yego's story inspired others, including Zeddy Cherotich, also of Kalenjin heritage and from Kericho County. She initially took up javelin before transitioning to judo, a sport with limited infrastructure in Kenya. In 2024, she became the first Kenyan woman to compete in Olympic judo, qualifying through international rankings just two years after she began training. Though she was defeated in her opening match at the Paris Games, her mere qualification was a historic breakthrough.

Another standout is Paul Bitok, born in 1974 in Simat, Uasin Gishu County. Bitok made history as the first Kenyan to play professional volleyball abroad, with stints in Tunisia and Croatia. After returning home, he coached Kenya Commercial Bank's team to an African Clubs Championship title in 2006. He later transformed Rwanda's national team by establishing grassroots programs and regional camps. In 2019, Bitok returned to Kenya to lead the Malkia Strikers, guiding the national women's team to Olympic qualification and a gold medal at the 2019 African Games. His election as Deputy President of the Kenya Volleyball Federation in 2023 signaled a shift into high-level sports leadership.

Equally compelling is the story of Joshua Cheruiyot Kirui, a mountaineer whose passion for endurance took him far beyond tracks and trails. Born in 1984 in Nairobi, Kirui climbed Mount Kenya over 20 times, completed ultramarathons across four continents, and became the first African to summit Mt. Manaslu (8,163 meters) without supplemental oxygen. In 2024, he attempted to become the first African to summit Mount Everest under the same conditions. Tragically, he and his Sherpa guide perished during the final ascent.

== Pastimes ==
=== Viewerthons ===
A viewerthon is a spectator event, usually on a screen in a social setting, of a long distance athletics event. They are often sponsored by a government or corporate entity and may have appearances by past successful athletes. The term is a portmanteau of the words ‘view’ and ‘marathon’ and the event arose from the success of Kalenjin athletes in these types of events giving rise to widespread viewership of notable races. Viewerthons are particularly noted in the town of Eldoret and it is not uncommon to find large screens being installed around town during Olympic and World Athletic Championship races. They attained notability during Eliud Kipchoge's attempt at running a marathon under 2 hours, an event publicized as the Ineos 1:59, which gained global prominence leading to much local interest.
