= Kipsang =

Kipsang is a masculine given name among the Kalenjin people in Kenya. It means "born outside the house". Kalenjin naming customs and methods are mainly aligned to the events, scenarios or the environment at the time a person was born. A baby born outside the house would be named Kipsang if they were a male and Chesang if they were a female.

- Emmanuel Kipsang (born 1991), Kenyan long-distance track runner
- Geoffrey Kipsang (born 1992), Kenyan cross country and half marathon runner
- Hillary Kipsang Yego (born 1992), Kenyan steeplechase runner
- James Kipsang Kwambai (born 1983), Kenyan marathon runner
- John Korir Kipsang (born 1975), Kenyan road runner
- Salim Kipsang (born 1979), Kenyan marathon runner
- William Kipsang (born 1977), Kenyan marathon runner
- Wilson Kipsang Kiprotich (born 1982), Kenyan marathon runner
- Abel Kipsang (born 1996), Kenyan middle-distance runner
