= Chelele =

Kalenjin singer-songwriter

- Born: Diana Chemutai Musila; Mugango Village, Bomet County
- Died: January 2016 (aged 27–28) Unknown, body planted posthumously at own home
- Spouse: Erick Makau Musila

Diana Chemutai Musila, known by her stage name, Chelele, was a Kalenjin secular music singer and songwriter. She sang in Kipsigis, a dialect of Kalenjin language. The Kalenjin are a Southern Nilotic ethnicity that inhabits the former Rift Valley Province of Kenya and a number of districts in the Mount Elgon area in Uganda. Chelele's songs were ranked top the charts on Kalenjin radio and TV stations during her years of fecund music production. She is reminisced for her feisty demeanor during all her recording and stage performances.

Chelele was born in 1988 at Mugango village in Bomet County, Kenya. Between 1994 and 2006, she attended Njerian Primary before progressing to Chebonei Girl's High School in Bomet. She discovered her talent at the school in Form 3 while participate in the country's music festivals competition for secondary schools. She was married to Erick Musila Makau, the then Administration Policeman under Kenya Police. They had two daughters.

In 2012, Chelele was suspected and charged alongside her husband, Erick Musila over the murder of a Kenyan businessman and land surveyor. Both were suspected by police to have killed the businessman over relationship brawls.

In October 2015, the singer made a suicide attempt on her life while on her way from a performance in Eldoret; she was nursed and hospitalized in Nakuru as a result and discharged upon quick recovery. In Kenya, cultural views on mental health hold sway and as a result, people do not seek help. Kenya is also infamous for having poor mental health system and a derisive pop-culture attitude towards the practice.

Chelele and her husband were both embroiled in a case at the Kericho court after her husband, a police officer by profession, took their children away from her. She confided in her friend that her husband had become licentious. She was reported missing on Jan 7th 2016, with her then estranged husband seen with her shortly before her disappearance. On 10 Jan 2016, her body was discovered plunked at the veranda of her own home, killed in cold blood. Her body had deep cuts and her intestines were gutted out. The police remarked that her body might have been staged posthumously, with the actual murder probably having transpired elsewhere. She was given an emotional send off on 21 January 2016 at her residential home at Kapkwen in Bomet. The burial was attended by thousands of mourners and a majority of Kalenjin leaders.

In 2019, Erick Makau Musila, the husband, was found guilty of having killed the Eldoret-based surveyor and businessman. He was also charged for the murder of his wife, Diana.
