= Lembus people =

Lembus is one of the sub-tribes of Kalenjin people. They are sub-divided into Kamaruso, Somek, Murkaptuk, Agiekablembus,Kakimor Chepkero, Kapkosom and Emom. They settled in Emom, Chepkero, ElKamaruso, Kakimor, Lembus Mosop, Lembus Soin, Lembus Kongasis (east), and Lembus Kiptuiya (west). Other areas are Keiyo and Laikipia, etc..

The Lembus people are perceived to be Tugen people, but this assertion has been rejected by the Lembus themselves, and their Lembus Council of Elders based on migration history, cultural practice and language Members of the Lembus community insist that Tugen is just a name coined in the 1960s to unite the small communities living in Baringo. In 2019, the Lembus people moved to court demanding to be recognized as a distinct ethnic group and not as a sub-tribe of the Tugen.

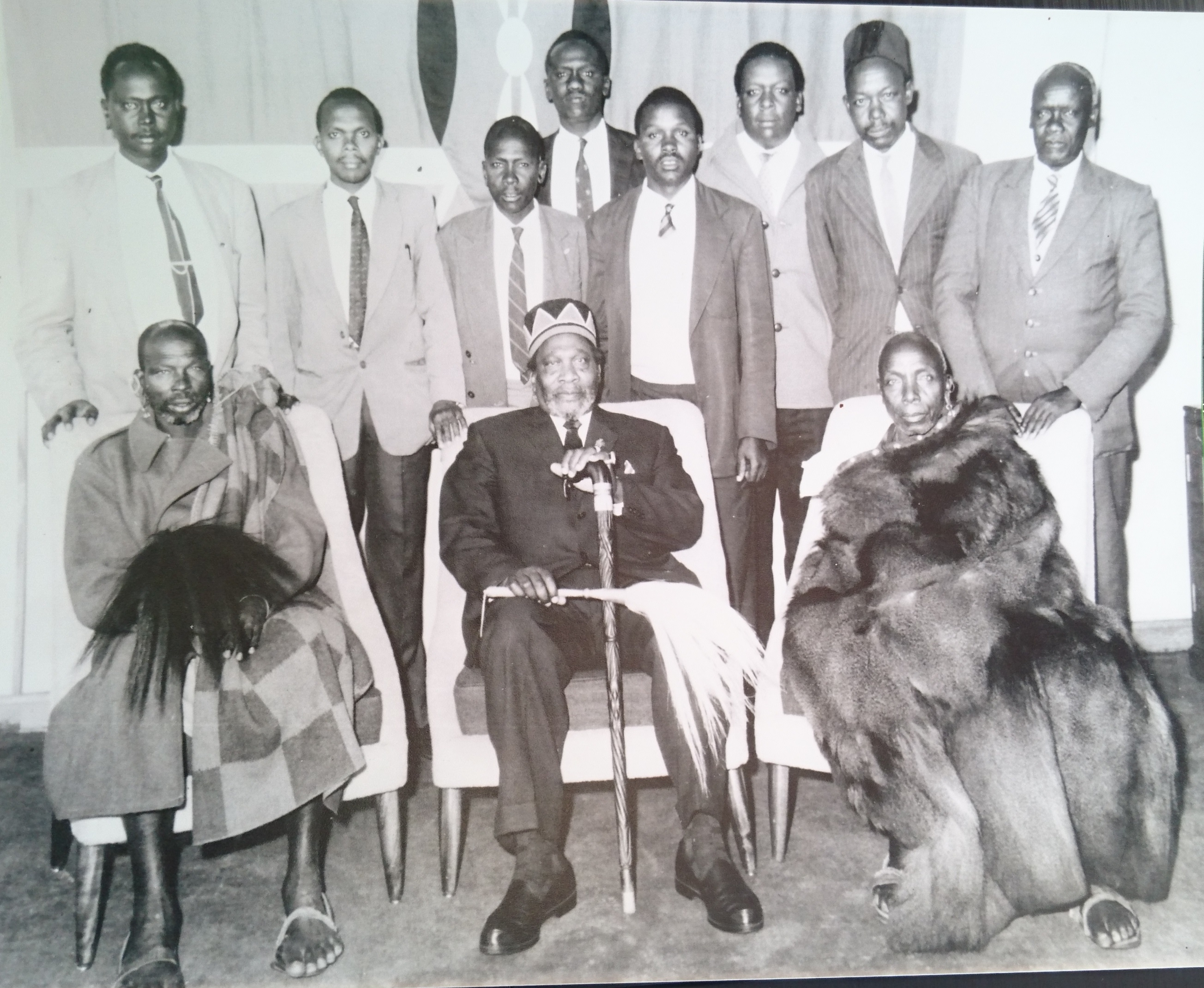
Lembus Council of Elders with Mzee Kenyatta when they visited him in his Gatundu home

== The Lembus and Nandi peoples ==
The Lembus people have had close relationship with the Nandi, dating back to the precolonial period. It is also notable that the Lembus and the Nandi share a lot of cultural, language and religious similarities. In the 1890s, the Lembus resisted the British entry into Lembus territories and especially the Lembus Forest. The resistance by the Lembus also coincided with the Nandi Resistance to the British in the late 1890s to 1906. The British administrators in Eldama Ravine also accused the Lembus of collusion with the Nandi to fight the British.
