= Almo =

Almo may refer to:

- Almo (god), a river deity from Roman mythology
- Almo, the ancient name for the River Almone near Rome (whence the name of the above deity)
- Almo, Idaho, a town in the United States
- Almo, Kentucky, a town in the United States
- Almo Sounds, a record label
- Almo and Coco, two fictional characters from the manga and video game series Galaxy Angel
- Arms-length management organisation
