= Sapaei =

The Sapaei (also rendered as Sape, Saba, or Sembritae) were an ancient people mentioned in several Greco-Roman sources, situated in the region surrounding the island of Meroë in what is now central Sudan. While their precise identity remains uncertain, classical writers generally place them in the Nile Valley south of Egypt, within or near the Meroitic sphere, and sometimes associate them with Egyptian exiles or local hunting communities.

== Origins ==
The roots of the people later known as the Sapaei, Sape, or Sembritae may trace back to an episode recorded by Herodotus concerning a mass migration of Egyptian soldiers into Ethiopia. These troops, originally part of a vast garrison system under Pharaoh Psamtik I in the 7th century BCE, had been stationed along Egypt’s frontiers to guard against incursions by Kushites, Libyans, Assyrians, and Arabians. After serving for three years without rotation or relief, some 240,000 soldiers revolted and marched south. Herodotus refers to them by the Egyptian designation Asmach, meaning “those who stand on the left hand of the king,” while also using the Greek term Automoli, meaning “deserters” — a name reflecting their renunciation of loyalty to Egypt.

On reaching Ethiopia, these ex-soldiers were welcomed by the local king and granted land previously inhabited by rebellious subjects, whom they were tasked with expelling. Their settlement was not just military but civilizational: they introduced Egyptian customs and institutions that, according to Herodotus, had a “sensible effect in civilising the Ethiopians.” This moment of desertion and re-foundation echoes through later Greco-Roman accounts of southern Nubian polities ruled by “strangers.”

Herodotus places the Automoli at the southern limit of Nile geography known to the Egyptians, stating that the journey from Elephantine to their territory required no less than four months, “partly by land and partly by water.” This travel description aligns most closely with the course of the Blue Nile, whose cataracts and terrain would have necessitated alternating between boat and overland travel. Classical geography defines the Island of Meroë as the land enclosed between the Nile, Atbara, and Blue Nile rivers—within which the Automoli would therefore fall. Given the distance and directional cues, their placement lies likely within the southern reaches of the Island of Meroë, just before a territory Herodotus describes as an uninhabitable and unknown desert.

== Classical references ==
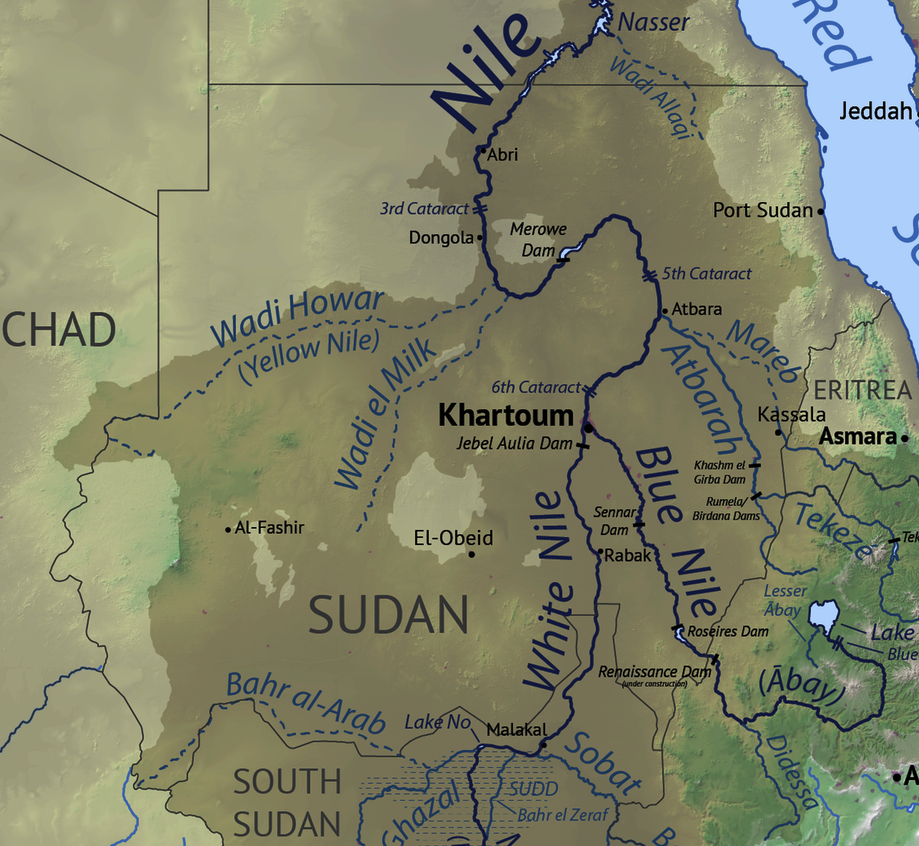
Nile Map Sudan

Among the earliest references to the Sapaei is that from Geography by Claudius Ptolemy (2nd century CE), who locates them in Middle Ethiopia, south of the island of Meroë (historically the region between the Atbarah and the Nile).

...toward the island of Meroe, are the Memnones and more to the south are the Sapaei. In the remaining parts of the land toward the west from the Ethiopian mountains next to the sandy and dry region dwell the Phazaniai and the Bakalitides races;

— Ptolemy; Geography

He places them between the Nile and the river Astapos (likely the Blue Nile), among other groups such as the Memnones and the Elephantophagi. The Sapaei are described as inhabiting the area beyond the Sebridai and Ptoemphanai, in proximity to the Cinnamon-bearing lands. This geographic framing situates them firmly in the upper Nile Valley, in the borderlands between Nubia and inner Sudan.

In Natural History, Pliny the Elder (1st century CE) cites the writer Aristocreon, who describes a place called Esar, twelve days' journey beyond Meroë. According to a second source, Bion, this settlement was called Sape, a name said to mean “the strangers.”

...at a further distance of twelve days' journey (from Meroë), Esar, a town founded by the Egyptians who fled from Psammetichus;" he states also that they dwelt there for a period of three hundred years, and that opposite, on the Arabian side, there is a town of theirs called Daron. The town, however, which he calls Esar, is by Bion called Sape, who says that the name means "the strangers"

— Pliny; Natural History

Pliny adds that the Sape had their capital at Sembobitis, located on an island, and other settlements such as Daron and Sinat, one of which lay on the Arabian side of the Red Sea.

Strabo, writing around the same time, refers to a port named Saba near the Sabaitic mouth of the Red Sea and notes a hunting ground for elephants of the same name.

...next Saba a port, and a hunting-ground for elephants of the same name. The country deep in the interior is called Tenessis. It is occupied by those Egyptians who took refuge from the government of Psammitichus.

— Strabo; Geography

These exiles, Strabo further states, were known as Sembritae, interpreted to mean “strangers,” and were said to be ruled by a queen whose domain included Meroë and nearby river islands. Strabo’s account reinforces the idea of a distinct group with Egyptian origins establishing residence in the Meroitic heartland.

A later tradition recorded by Josephus presents a variant origin for the city of Meroë itself. He states that the city had originally borne the name Saba, named after the founder of the region, and that it was later renamed Meroë by the Persian king Cambyses in honor of his sister.

=== Identity and interpretation ===
While the names Sapaei, Sape, Saba, and Sembritae may reflect transliteration differences among Greek and Latin sources, it remains unclear whether they refer to a single people or overlapping designations for different elements of a broader population. What is more certain is that these names consistently describe a group located in or near the island of Meroë, engaged in elephant hunting and possibly involved in trade along both the Nile and Red Sea corridors.

The frequent description of these people as “strangers,” especially in the accounts of Bion and Strabo, suggests they were an exilic or migrant community, possibly descended from Egyptians who fled south during political upheaval in the Late Period, notably during the reign of Psammetichus I (7th century BCE). Their integration into local political systems, including queenship and settlement on Nile islands, suggests a degree of accommodation and possibly hybrid identity within the broader Kushitic cultural sphere.

=== Geographic setting and lifeways ===
The Sapaei—variously referred to as Sape, Saba, and Sembritae—are consistently situated by classical sources within the southern Nile Valley, in a region bounded by the Nile’s great tributaries: the Nile and the Blue Nile (Astapos), occupying a stretch of land south of the classical island of Meroë (area bounded by Atbarah and Blue Nile). Their association with elephant hunting, noted by Pliny and Strabo, implies sustained interaction with the wooded and savannah regions of the southern Nile corridor, and possibly involvement in long-distance trade through both African and Arabian routes.

Pliny names their capital as Sembobitis, located on an island, a description that may refer to Meroë itself or to another fluvial island further upriver. Classical writers also mention other settlements such as Daron and Sinat, possibly located east of the Nile or in regions associated with Red Sea trade. The consistent emphasis on insular or river-bound geography supports the view that the Sapaei inhabited a nexus of major waterways, fertile floodplains, and strategic trade corridors.

The location and toponyms of this polity of the classical era overlaps with medieval accounts of the Christian kingdom of Alwa, whose capital at Soba lay near the confluence of the White and Blue Niles. A particularly large and fertile "island" between these rivers—extending southward into modern-day South Sudan—appears to echo the classical motif of riverine polities ruled by foreigners or “strangers,” providing a possible cultural and geographical continuation of the earlier Sapaei tradition.

=== Ezana's campaign and the post-Meroitic transition ===
The period between the fall of the Kingdom of Meroe and the emergence of the Christian Nubian kingdoms remains poorly documented. One of the few contemporary sources is a 4th-century inscription left by the Aksumite king Ezana, conventionally dated to around 350 CE. Composed in Ge‘ez, the inscription describes a military campaign launched by Ezana into the Nile Valley, including areas associated with the former Meroitic heartland. It references both the Noba, who appear to have occupied parts of this region, and Kasu, a term possibly related to the legacy of Kush.

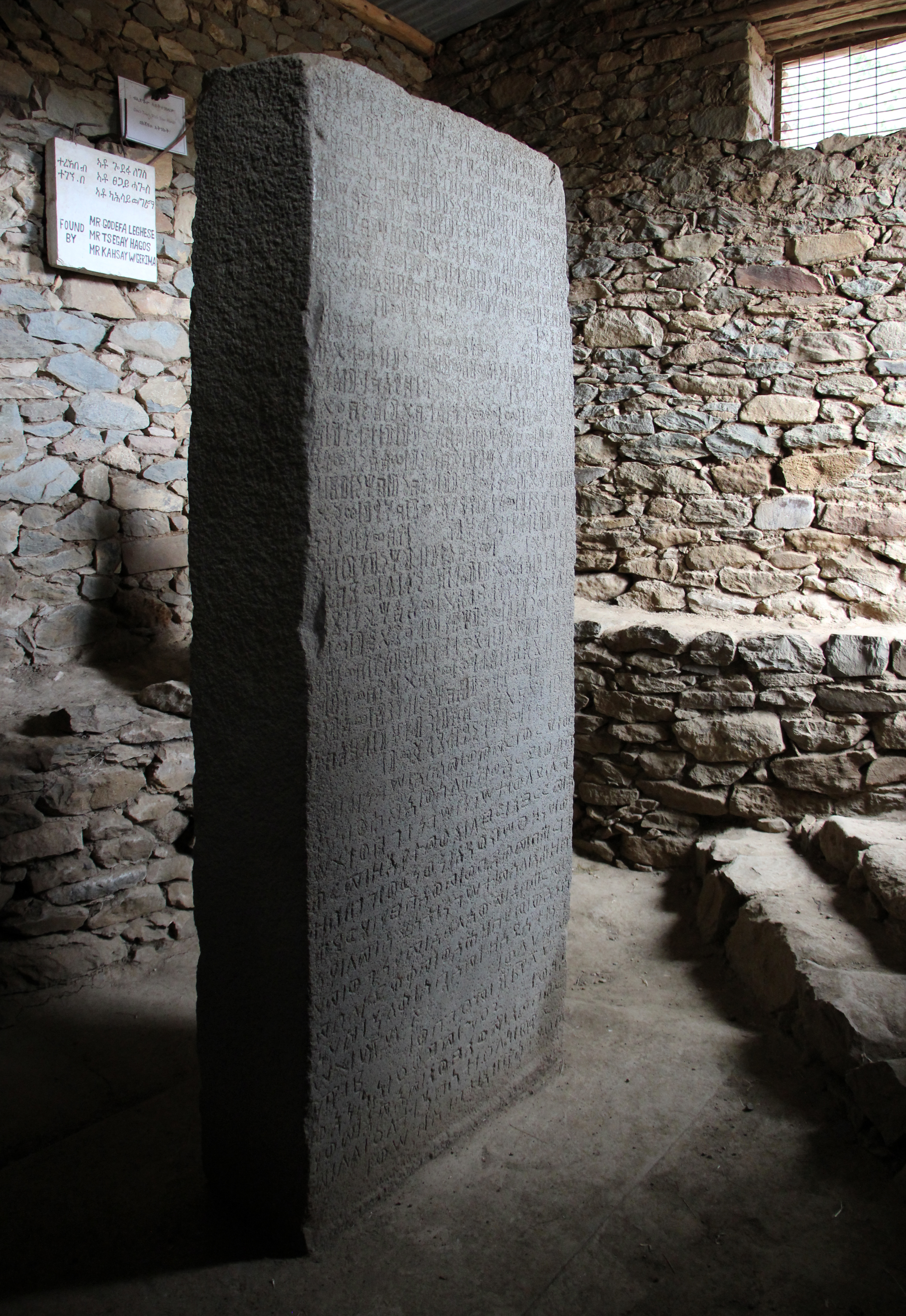
The Ezana Stone

The passage, translated by Littmann (1913), offers rare insight into the political and cultural changes unfolding in the Butana (Island of Meroe) and surrounding areas during this transitional era:

The son of Ella Amid, king of Axum (and from)... . By the might of the Lord of the all, I made war upon the Noba for the peoples had rebelled and made a boast of it. And they were in the habit of attacking the peoples of Mangurto and Hasa and Barya and the blacks and made war upon the Red Peoples. And as they broke the oath a second and a third time and they refused to cease from killing their neighbors and our messenger and our envoy. And as I again sent and they did not listen but rejected and then betook themselves to fight I made war upon them ... and fought war with them on the Takkaze (Atbara River) at the ford of Kemlke. Thereupon they took flight and would not make a stand. And I followed after for twenty and three days, killing some and capturing others. . . . Meanwhile I burnt their towns both those built of bricks and those built of reeds and my soldiers carried off their food and copper and iron ...and destroyed the statues of their temples and their stock of corn and cotton trees and tumbled them into the River Seda (Nile). And I came to Kasu and fought a battle and made prisoners at the junction of the Rivers Takkaze and Seda. The names of the cities built of bricks were Alwa and Daro. The towns which the Noba had taken were Tabiro and Fartoti.

The inscription describes a campaign that reached as far as the confluence of the Nile and Atbara rivers, listing several towns — including Alwa and Daro — as being built of brick and previously under Noba control. These place names suggest the continued occupation of urban centers associated with the former Meroitic realm, albeit now under different political authorities. The appearance of Alwa in this context, centuries before the rise of the medieval Christian kingdom of the same name, suggests some degree of continuity in settlement or toponymy.

Though the precise identity and relationships of the Noba and Kasu remain debated, the inscription reflects a moment of upheaval in which new groups were asserting authority in former Meroitic territories. It stands as one of the few historical records bridging the post-Meroitic gap and provides a valuable, if partial, glimpse into the region's transformation during Late Antiquity.

== Medieval references ==
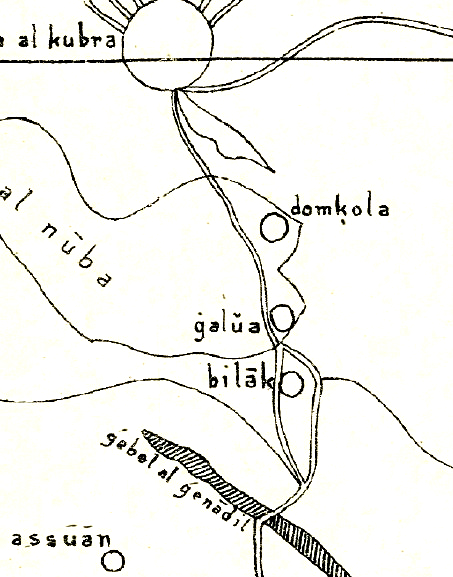
South-up map of Nubia by al-Idrisi (1192 AD). Alodia ("galua") is erroneously depicted as being north of Makuria ("domkola", after Dongola, the Makurian capital).

In the 10th century, the Arab geographer Ibn Hawqal recorded a vivid description of the Christian kingdom of Alwa (also known as Alodia), the southernmost of the three medieval Nubian kingdoms in the Nile Valley. Drawing on first-hand accounts from his travels and local informants, Ibn Hawqal depicted Alwa as a thriving and expansive state, more populous and wealthier than its northern counterpart, Muqurra (Makuria). With its capital at Soba, near modern-day Khartoum, Alwa was characterized by fertile agricultural land, prosperous villages, and a cohesive Christian polity. The longevity and stability of Alwan kingship is emphasized, with Ibn Hawqal detailing a dynastic succession from 'King' Karijawa, who had succeeded his father, to his nephew 'King' Kerit.

Ibn Hawqal also provides a geopolitical map of Alwa’s reach, mentioning the king’s authority over a vast island situated between the White Nile and Green (Blue) Nile, at the heart of the Kingdom of Alwa. This “island,” reportedly so extensive that its southern extent could not be reached even by royal expeditions, was populated by diverse groups and served as a major center of agriculture and royal provisioning. The capital of Alwa, Soba, was located near the northern tip of this landmass, at the rivers’ confluence. The description aligns closely with the area today bounded by the confluence of the White and Blue Niles to the north, and perhaps by the Sobat River to the south—a tract of fertile land enclosed by major waterways.

This same region corresponds remarkably well to the classical geographers’ accounts of the Sapaei, Sape, Saba, and Sembritae—groups variously placed south of the "island of Meroë" and between the Nile and Blue Nile. Strabo, in particular, notes a port and elephant-hunting ground called Saba, governed by a queen and settled by exilic Egyptians known as the Sembritae. These figures were described as living in an inland region accessible within fifteen days from Meroë, which closely matches the geographic position of Alwa’s heartland. The repetition of “islands” in classical and medieval accounts—one framed by the Atbarah and Nile (classical Meroë) and another by the Nile and Blue Nile (Alwa’s domain)—suggests a conceptual and geopolitical continuity, with each serving as the administrative and spiritual center of successive Kushite polities.

The placement of Alwa’s capital at Soba, a name possibly echoing ancient toponyms like Saba or Sape, reinforces the likelihood of historical continuity or cultural memory linking the two. The overlapping names, geographic congruence, and consistent association with riverine trade and structured governance imply that the Sapaei/Sape/Saba/Sembritae described in Greco-Roman texts may have inhabited or shaped the same environment later ruled by the Christian kingdom of Alwa.

=== Decline and dispersal ===
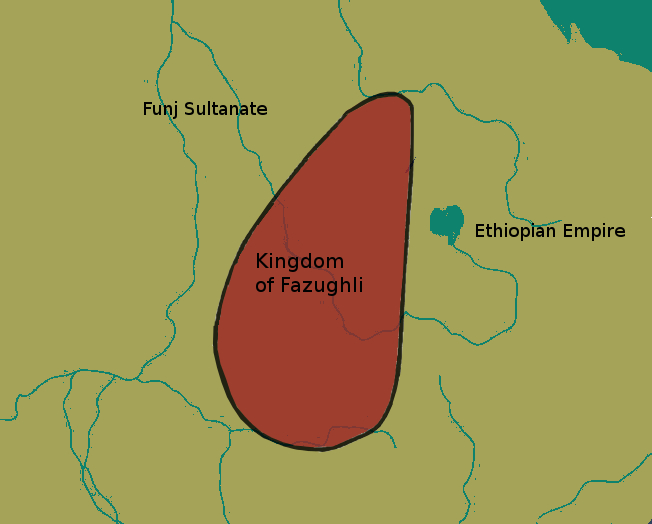
Estimation of the Kingdom of Fazughli, traditionally said to have been founded by Nubian refugees fleeing the fall of Alodia around 1500 CE

The final disappearance of the Sapaei from the historical record appears to coincide with the collapse of the Christian Kingdom of Alwa in the early 16th century. In Arabic chronicles of the Funj, the term ‘Anaj is used for the rulers of Soba, the capital of Alwa, and is interpreted in some traditions to refer to the Nubians of the Séba region.

According to the Funj Chronicles, a coalition between ‘Amara Dunqas‘ of the Funj and ‘Abdallah Jamma‘ of the Qawasma Arabs led to the conquest of Soba around 910 AH (1504–5 CE). The rulers of Soba—the ‘Anaj—were overthrown, and their Christian kingdom destroyed. Following their defeat, the remaining population—perhaps representing descendant communities of the Sapaei—dispersed in several directions. Some "fled to the hills of the south, Faziighli and elsewhere. Some fled by the west to the hills of Kordofan", while a few are noted to have remained in small communities in Shandi, Jarf Qamar, and scattered rural areas. The latter communities eventually assimilated into the growing Islamic and Arabic-speaking population, losing their distinct language and culture over time.

== Legacy ==
The memory of the Sapaei survives primarily through Greco-Roman and Arabic ethnographic writing, which preserves a layered account of migration, identity, and cultural adaptation in one of the most dynamic regions of the ancient Nile Valley.

== See also ==
- Kushites
