= Mursik =

Fermented milk product

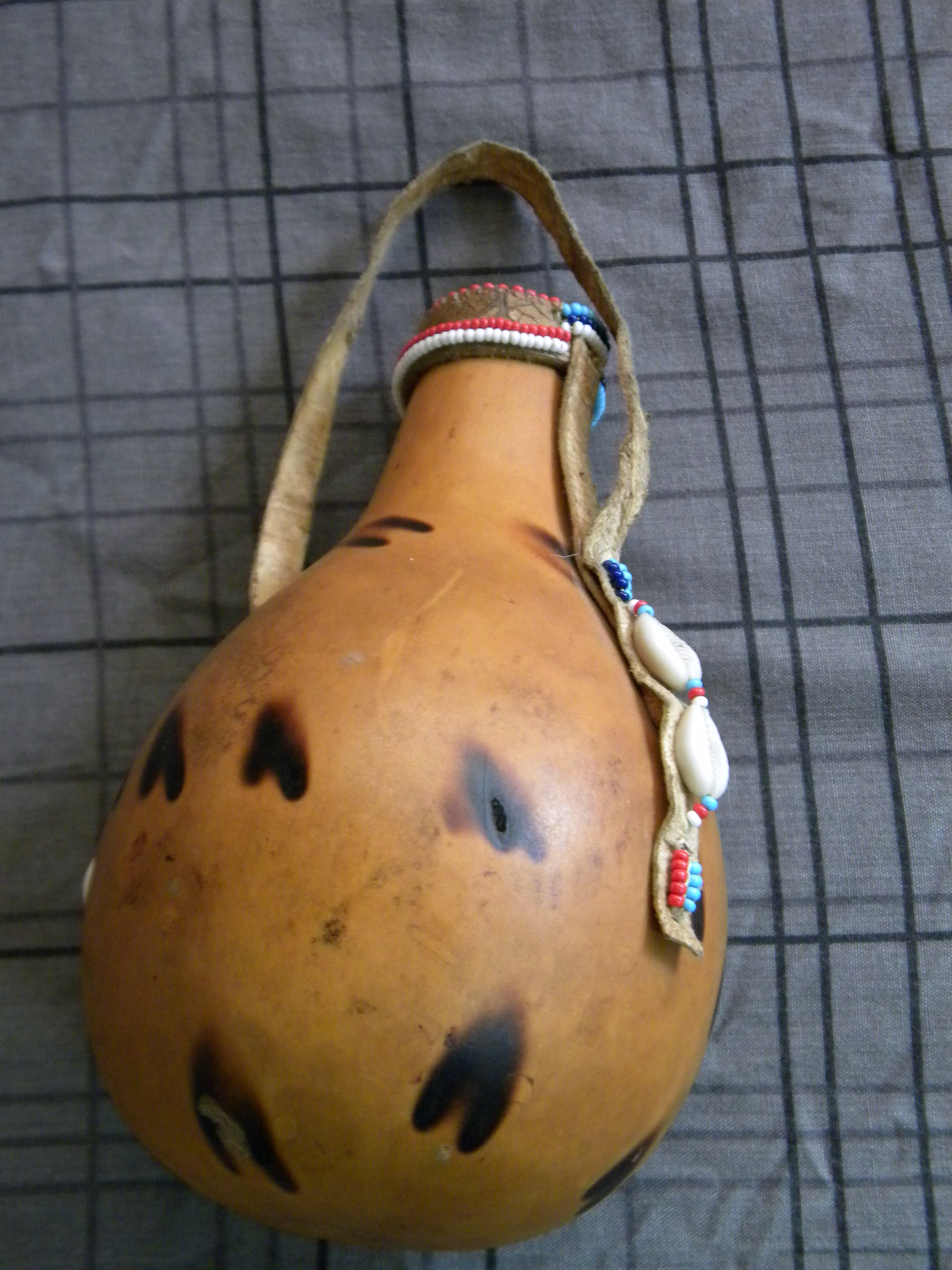
- Gourd used to make mursik
- Alternative names: Maziwa lala (Swahili)
- Type: Milk
- Course: Drink
- Place of origin: Kenya
- Region or state: Rift Valley
- Cooking time
- Serving temperature: Room temperature
- Main ingredients: Milk
- Ingredients generally used: Soot (optional), cow blood (optional)
- Similar dishes: Yogurt, sour milk

Mursik is a traditional fermented milk variant of the Kalenjin people of Kenya. It can be made from cow or goat milk and is fermented in a specially made calabash gourd locally known as a sotet. The gourd is lined with soot from specific trees, such as the African senna, which add flavor to the fermented milk. It is normally consumed with ugali or on its own and is served at room temperature or chilled.

== Culture ==
Mursik has strong cultural significance for the Kalenjin both in terms of identity as well as socially. It is a common drink in the Rift Valley region and is available in urban areas of Kenya. It has over time become synonymous with Kenyan athletics. A significant majority of Kenyan athletic heroes are Kalenjin and scenes of them receiving a sip of mursik at the airport having returned from international duty form part of Kenya's cultural tapestry.

When a couple gets married, dowry negotiations are held as part of the koito ceremony. At the end of the negotiations, mursik is served and drunk together by those present as a symbol of agreement and unity, it is considered crucial to the process.

== Preparation ==
Mursik is prepared primarily from cows' milk (but also less commonly goat's milk, or rarely sheep's milk) fermented in specially made seasoned milk gourds that are pre-treated with the smoke and charcoal of certain species of trees prior to each use. Fresh/raw milk (or, more commonly in modern times, milk that has been first boiled then cooled to ambient temperature) is poured into the specially prepared gourd. The gourd is then capped and placed in a cool dry place to undergo spontaneous fermentation for at least three to five days, through the action of lactic acid bacteria, yeast and mould species. Traditionally in some communities, but very rarely in modern times, fresh blood tapped from a cow may have been added to fresh milk before fermentation, or to already fermented milk. Lactobacillus plantarum was found to be the most dominant of the lactic acid bacteria involved in the production of mursik. Other lactic acid bacteria isolated from mursik are Leuconostoc mesenteroides and Enterococcus faecium. Saccharomyces sp. and Geotrichum candidum have also been isolated from mursik

Smoke and charcoal from specific trees has long been used in the traditional production of fermented milk products in Kenya. Among the common tree species used by farmers for milk treatment in production of mursik are Senna didymobotrya, Lippia kituiensis, Prunus africana and Olea europaea ssp. africana.

A gourd is smeared inside with special charcoal called "wosek"; from this, gray lines can be seen when pouring the thick, sour milk. In preparing the gourd, the Kalenjin women, for instance, make a brush (sosiot) from a branch of cycad tree used to clean the inside. Brushes made from this tree are hardy and may last for up to two years before replacement.

Charcoal "osek", formed from the smouldering embers of branches from the Ite or Itet tree (peanut butter cassia, scientifically known as Senna didymobotrya), is used as a milk preservative. Women use the embers to coat the inside of the cleaned gourd. The charcoal has various effects. It lines the inside of the gourd, reducing its porosity rendering it airtight. The smoke from the embers also has a preservative effect which prevents undesired bacterial multiplication that causes spoilage, while allowing natural souring. The charcoal smoke imparts a special flavour to the milk, and a bluish colour which is of high aesthetic value to the consumer. Having prepared the gourd, women pasteurize the milk by boiling. The pasteurized milk is left to cool before pouring into the gourd. Finally the gourd is corked to render it airtight, making it possible for the milk to be preserved for up to a month.

== Variations ==
There are various flavours of mursik, depending on how it is prepared and what quality of milk is used. Many tree species have been adjudged suitable for the purpose of imparting the preservative and aromatic effect to milk. There are many causes of unusual milk flavour, including the effect of plain gourd walls, which impart a bittersweet tang, and the plainness of white ripened milk, the role of itet is paramount. Several trees are good for the purpose. One characteristic is common though: high tannin content in the bark of the tree concerned. The popular ones include sertwet (acacia) and Cheblayat (wattle tree). Cheblayat is by far the most commonly used, on account of nearly universal availability, although sertwet is preferred by the purists.

Mursik can be prepared from a full gourd of milk corked all at once. Another method of preparing it is by pouring in a pint every three days or so. The fermented milk provides the culture for the new milk, and seems to accelerate its ripening. After the gourd is full, it is corked for a while, to achieve a varied consistency of proper sour milk, and results in a clear, sharp (almost bitter in some cases) liquid in which white globules of butter float, shaken well. Another type is the fast fermenting, even type, which gives a white, porridge like consistency.

Another variant of mursik is called rotik. This variant contains blood mixed with milk and let to ferment and has a slightly pink colouration. This variant is rare to come by as the practice of drawing blood from cattle is no longer being practiced widely. This variant is believed to be rich in iron and protein and was given to women who had just delivered or warriors who were wounded in battle.

== Health concerns ==
Consumption of mursik has been linked to a high incidence of esophageal squamous cell carcinoma, due to the presence of the carcinogen acetaldehyde in the drink.

== See also ==
- Cuisine of Kenya
- Amasi
