= Misri legend =

East African origin myth

The Misri legend is an origin myth common to a number of East African communities. In it, it is usually claimed that the community originated in a land called Misri located in the North of African continent. This land is in many accounts identified or associated with Egypt and sometimes an association with lost tribes of Israel is implied and occasionally directly stated.

== Prevalence ==
Dr Ochieng (1972) noted the legend among the Kisii people who claim that before they migrated to Mt Elgon, they lived in a country called 'Misri' that was located north of Mt Elgon. In the legend, the Kisii traveled south in the company of the Kuria, the Maragoli, Bukusu, and Meru. The Maragoli in turn claim that while they were at Misri, they lived with Arabs, the Kikuyu, Meru, Embu, Baganda, Basoga as well as the other Luhya subtribes. Dr Ochieng notes that the Misri legend had also been recorded among the other Luhya subtribes as well as the Haya, Alur, Kipsigis and the Marakwet.

== Origins ==
The concept of a 'migration' of a people south into Africa from Egypt originated in the mid-19th century with the development of the Hamitic hypothesis whose origins go further back to the development of the Hamitic race theory.

Of particular note in the development of the hypothesis was the examination of thousands of human skulls by Samuel George Morton who argued on this basis that the differences between the races were too broad to have stemmed from a single common ancestor but were instead consistent with separate racial origins. In his Crania Aegyptiaca (1844), Morton analyzed over a hundred intact crania gathered from the Nile Valley and concluded that the ancient Egyptians were racially akin to Europeans. His conclusions would establish the foundation for the American School of anthropology and would also influence proponents of polygenism.

=== Hamitic hypothesis ===
The British explorer John Hanning Speke popularized the ancient Hamitic peregrinations in his publications on his search for the source of the Nile River. Speke believed that his explorations uncovered the link between "civilized" North Africa and "primitive" central Africa. Describing the Ugandan Kingdom of Buganda, he argued that its "barbaric civilization" had arisen from a nomadic pastoralist race who had migrated from the north and was related to the Hamitic Oromo (Galla) of Ethiopia. In his Theory of Conquest of Inferior by Superior Races (1863), Speke would also attempt to outline how the Empire of Kitara in the African Great Lakes region may have been established by a Hamitic founding dynasty.

In his influential The Mediterranean Race (1901), the anthropologist Giuseppe Sergi argued that the Mediterranean race had likely originated from a common ancestral stock that evolved in the Sahara region in Africa, and which later spread from there to populate North Africa, the Horn of Africa, and the circum-Mediterranean region. According to Sergi, the Hamites themselves constituted a Mediterranean variety, and one situated close to the cradle of the stock. He added that the Mediterranean race "in its external characters is a brown human variety, neither white nor negroid, but pure in its elements, that is to say not a product of the mixture of Whites with Negroes or negroid peoples."

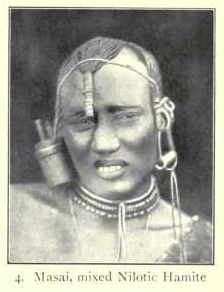
A Maasai, labelled a "mixed Nilotic Hamite" in Augustus Henry Keane's Man, Past and Present (1899). Writers such as Keane and C.G. Seligman believed that ethnic groups such as the Maasai and the Tutsi, traditionally considered Negro, were of partly Hamitic descent. Seligman used the term "Hamiticised Negro". He largely based this on their cattle-raising culture and comparatively narrower facial features than those of other neighboring Great Lakes tribes.

Sergi explained this taxonomy as inspired by an understanding of "the morphology of the skull as revealing those internal physical characters of human stocks which remain constant through long ages and at far remote spots[...] As a zoologist can recognise the character of an animal species or variety belonging to any region of the globe or any period of time, so also should an anthropologist if he follows the same method of investigating the morphological characters of the skull[...] This method has guided me in my investigations into the present problem and has given me unexpected results which were often afterwards confirmed by archaeology or history."

The Hamitic hypothesis reached its apogee in the work of C. G. Seligman, who argued in his book The Races of Africa (1930) that:

Apart from relatively late Semitic influence... the civilizations of Africa are the civilizations of the Hamites, its history is the record of these peoples and of their interaction with the two other African stocks, the Negro and the Bushmen, whether this influence was exerted by highly civilized Egyptians or by such wider pastoralists as are represented at the present day by the Beja and Somali... The incoming Hamites were pastoral 'Europeans' – arriving wave after wave – better armed as well as quicker witted than the dark agricultural Negroes."

Seligman asserted that the Negro race was essentially static and agricultural, and that the wandering Hamitic "pastoral Caucasians" had introduced most of the advanced features found in central African cultures, including metal working, irrigation and complex social structures. Despite criticism, Seligman kept his thesis unchanged in the 1939 second edition of the book.

=== Hamiticised Negroes ===
Seligman and other early scholars believed that, in the African Great Lakes and parts of Central Africa, invading Hamites from North Africa and the Horn of Africa had mixed with local Negro women to produce several hybrid "Hamiticised Negro" populations. The Hamiticised Negroes were divided into three groups according to language and degree of Hamitic influence: the Negro-Hamites (later Nilo-Hamities) or Half-Hamites (such as the Maasai, Nandi and Turkana), the Nilotes (such as the Shilluk and Nuer), and the Bantus (such as the Hima and Tutsi). Seligman would explain this Hamitic influence through both demic diffusion and cultural transmission:

At first the Hamites, or at least their aristocracy, would endeavour to marry Hamitic women, but it cannot have been long before a series of peoples combining Negro and Hamitic blood arose; these, superior to the pure Negro, would be regarded as inferior to the next incoming wave of Hamites and be pushed further inland to play the part of an incoming aristocracy vis-a-vis the Negroes on whom they impinged... The end result of one series of such combinations is to be seen in the Masai [sic], the other in the Baganda, while an even more striking result is offered by the symbiosis of the Bahima of Ankole and the Bahiru [sic].

== Historiography ==
=== Early accounts ===
The Misri legend is evident in the earliest accounts of various East African peoples. Merker's (1904) account on the Maasai, later quoted in Hollis' (1905) work on the Nandi states "that the Masai (and presumably with them the Nandi, Turkana &c.) are the remains of a Semitic race which has wandered southwards from Arabia and been mingled with African elements." In this instance, the origin of some clans in Mt Elgon gives the 'northern origin' theory credence.

Though lacking direct reference to Misri, Kenyatta (1938) gives an illustrative account of how Christian beliefs came to be localized during the 1920s. The fusion of old traditions and the new belief system resulted in the Watu wa Mungu view that they were the "chosen people of God", referred to by the old name but seen as the God of the Bible, and thus "they proclaim that they belong to the lost tribes of Israel."

=== Post-colonial accounts ===
Of the post-colonial accounts on the Misri legend, Dr Ochieng's (1972) was perhaps the most influential. In his analysis he details the prevalence as indicated above but also makes a subtle and notable observation. Of the Ganda, the Soga and the Gwe he states that "the traditions of these people do not specifically mention Misri but their migrations from the Elgon population and beyond would lend strong support to their earlier association with travelers from the mythical 'Misri'" implying that any community with a tradition of origin pointing to Mt Elgon originates in 'Misri'.

It is notable that he terms it the "mythical Misri" for by the time of his account the word Misri was prevalent in the lexicon of many of these communities. In regard to this he observes "The first point to take into account is that Misri as referred to in these traditions, denotes a specific territory to the north of Mount Elgon; it is not simply a direction. If it were a direction it is most unlikely that both the Bantu-speaking groups and the Rift Valley Nilotes would use the same term for it." In stating this he does not explain how Mt Elgon, a more recent 'stop-over', came to have different names among all these communities.

In his analysis of the legend, he does note that some East African historians, notably G. A. Anyona and Gideon Were had flatly rejected the claims as "legends smuggled into African traditions, by Christian elders, from the Old Testament. Other historians e.g B.E Kipkorir were somewhat ambivalent about the claims while others such as J.B Osogo and Cardale Luck accepted the traditions and "in fact, go to the extent of trying to prove that some of these East African groups, who claim to have come from 'Misri', actually did come from Egypt.

In Dr Ochieng's analysis "the explanation that these traditions have been influenced by the Bible...is too simple to be swallowed uncritically" primarily because of prevalence and as "there is no reason why the various African societies who profess these traditions should not have acquired them independently of the Bible". He also questions why is "'Misri'(Egypt) agreed on as the homelands of these groups?" in light of the fact that both the Old and New Testaments mention other places in Africa-for example Cush, Ethiopia and Punt.

His conclusion would hark back to Seligman's position as laid out almost forty years earlier, the most significant departure from Seligman's position being that the primary bearers of the tradition were in his account Bantu communities;

It may well be that these people were non-Bantu and non-Nilotic originally, and that they were Bantuised or Nilotised, as they entered East Africa...and in light of our profound ignorance of the early movements of the East African peoples, there is no reason why we should reject wholesale the possibility that some Egyptian and Jewish blood entered the veins of the early Logoli, Gusii, Bukusu, Tachoni and such tribes as claim origin from 'Misri'

== Contemporary interpretations ==
Generally, the concept of Hamitic languages and the notion of a definable "Hamite" racial and linguistic entity has been discredited. In 1974, writing about the African Great Lakes region, Christopher Ehret described the Hamitic hypothesis as the view that "almost everything more un-'primitive', sophisticated or more elaborate in East Africa [was] brought by culturally and politically dominant Hamites, immigrants from the North into East Africa, who were at least part Caucasoid in physical ancestry". He called this a "monothematic" model, which was "romantic, but unlikely" and "[had] been all but discarded, and rightly so". He further argued that there were a "multiplicity and variety" of contacts and influences passing between various peoples in Africa over time, something that he suggested the "one-directional" Hamitic model obscured.

The localized adaptations in the form of the Misri legend are still very much alive in East Africa, however.

Dr Kipkoech araap Sambu in his account (2015) of the Kalenjin Peoples Oral Tradition of Ancient Egyptian Origin makes reference to the Misri legend. He notes that "generation after generation of the elder's of the Kalenjin-speaking people have passed on to the youth the tradition that their ancestors of antiquity migrated to East Africa from Misri". His synthesis of the tradition essentially traces the build-up of the myth among the Kalenjin.

He notes that Sang (2000) in his oral fieldwork among the Kipsigis found that "...the majority maintain that we came from Misri (Egypt) or Southern Sudan, all these being desert lands".

He points to Chesaina's (1991) fieldwork all over Kalenjinland where she encountered the myth time and again in a popular narrative which states that "...the Kalenjin originated from a country in the north of Kenya known as "Emetab Burgei", which means the hot country. It is speculated that this country was either Sudan or Egypt".

He notes that it was indeed evident in Hollis' work on the Nandi and on this basis dates the tradition to the pre-Christian eras. Much as he applies the Misri label to it, the relevant section quoted is Hollis' observation that;

The ancestors of the main body of what constitutes the so called Nandi-Lumbwa group, came beyond doubt, from the north. There is a distinct tradition to this effect, and it seems probable that the tribes allied to the Nandi who live on or near Mount Elgon...are only section of the migrants, the remainder having pushed on to the south and east, and settled in Nandi, Lumbwa, Buret, Sotik, Elgeyo and Kamasia
