= Chesang =

Chesang is a surname of Kenyan origin that may refer to:

- Reuben Chesang (born 1962), Kenyan middle-distance runner
- Peter Chesang (born 1990), Kenyan half marathon runner and winner at the 2008 Nairobi Marathon
- Stella Chesang (born 1996), Ugandan long-distance runner and winner at the 2015 World Mountain Running Championships
