= Koito =

Kalenjin wedding ritual

Koito ("To give away") is a Kalenjin wedding ritual which involves the negotiation of a brides dowry.

== Practice ==
There are variations in practice between the various sub-tribes, with the Kipsigis for example having a smaller celebration where only one's immediate family and oreet members are invited while the Nandi on the other hand have large celebrations where the whole village is invited.

For all however the key elements are similar; that is the negotiation of the dowry payment which is done by a few select members/negotiators from both families in the privacy of a room separate from the other guests. Mursik is drunk at the end of negotiations by those present to symbolize agreement and is seen as being crucial to the process.

After the negotiations, a celebration is held where the bridegroom and bride are given advice on family life by older relatives from both families. Usually symbolic gifts and presents are given to the couple during this ceremony.

The koito is often quite colorful and sometimes bears resemblance to a wedding ceremony and it is indeed gaining prominence as the key event since the kaayaaet'ap koito is sometimes merged with it and at other times the tunisiet is foregone in favor of it.
