= Kolobi =

The Kolobi (also rendered Colobi) were an ancient people of northeastern Africa mentioned in both Ptolemy’s Geography and Strabo’s Geographica. Although classical sources provide only brief descriptions, both authors place the Kolobi near the Red Sea coast, and likely refer to the same group. Their name and position in ancient geographical texts suggest they were one of the coastal or near-coastal populations known to Greco-Roman writers navigating the African shorelines of the Red Sea.

== Classical Accounts ==
The earliest reference to the Kolobi appears in Geographica by Strabo (1st century AD), who names a “Grove of the Colobi” along the Red Sea route south of Egypt:

..."Next to the harbour of Antiphilus is a port called the Grove of the Colobi (or the Mutilated), the city Berenice of Sabae, and Sabae a considerable city; then the grove of Eumenes."

— Strabo; Geographica 16.4.10

The term kolobi (Greek: κολοβοί) may be derived from kolobos (κολοβός), meaning “mutilated” or “cut short.” This suggests that the Kolobi were known for bodily ritual practices, such as circumcision, castration, or asceticism, though no specific cultural practices are recorded. The mention of a grove suggests a ritual or cultic site, perhaps recognized by Red Sea travelers.

A century later, Claudius Ptolemy (2nd century AD) listed the Kolobi in Geography 4.7.21, as part of a geographic sequence of peoples from north to south in northeast Africa:

“The Kolobi occupy that part of the region toward the east from the river which is near the Bazium promontory; next to these toward the south are the Tabieni; then the Sirtibes; next to these are the Attiri; then the Babylleni and the Rhizophagi; then the Axoumitai…”

— Ptolemy; Geography 4.7.21

Ptolemy’s sequence positions the Kolobi in the northern Red Sea corridor, possibly near modern-day Eritrea or eastern Sudan, and notably north of the Axoumitai (Axumites). This geographic correspondence with Strabo’s “Colobi” further supports their identification as the same people.

== Geographic Context ==
In both accounts, the Kolobi are placed in the coastal or subcoastal regions of the western Red Sea, near known ancient ports and waystations used by Roman and pre-Roman maritime traffic.

Later in the same chapter (§§4.7.23–25), Ptolemy describes the sources of the Nile, including Lake Koloe, and interior cities such as Auxoume (Axum) and Koloe city. These southern inland regions lie significantly further south than the Kolobi. While the similarity between the names Kolobi and Koloe attracts attention, there is no clear evidence of a direct connection, and it is possible that the resemblance is merely linguistic.

== See also ==
- Kushites
