= Kalenjin name =

Names used by the Kalenjin people of East Africa

Kalenjin names (sing. kainet, pl. old Kalenjin - kainok pl. modern Kalenjin - kainaik) are primarily used by the Kalenjin people of Kenya and Kalenjin language-speaking communities such as Murle in Ethiopia, Sebei of Uganda, Datooga, Akie and Aramanik of Tanzania.

The Kalenjin traditionally had two primary names for the individual, though in contemporary times, a Christian or Arabic name is also given at birth, such that most Kalenjin today have three names with the patronym Arap (in some cases being acquired later in life, e.g Alfred Kirwa Yego and Daniel Toroitich arap Moi).

== Given name ==
An individual is given a personal name at birth and this is determined by the circumstance of their birth. For most Kalenjin speaking communities, masculine names are often prefixed with Kip- or Ki- though there are exceptions to the rule e.g Cheruiyot, Chepkwony, Chelanga etc. Feminine names in turn are often prefixed with Chep-, Che- , or Jee(p)- though among the Tugen and Keiyo, the prefix Kip- may in some cases denote both males and females. The personal name would thus be derived through adding the relevant prefix to the description of the circumstance of birth, for example a child born in the evening (lagat) might be called Kiplagat or Chelagat.

Names may be dervied from nouns, verbs, adjectives, adverbs, or noun and verb compounds.

=== Popular given names ===
Some examples of popular Kalenjin names and their meanings;

Male name	Female name	Meaning
Kimutai	Chemutai/Jemutai	Time based
Kipchirchir	Chepchirchir	From 'chirchir' implying haste e.g born earlier than expected or after a short labour
Kipchoge	-	From 'choge', store/granary i.e born near the granary/store
Kipchumba	Chepchumba	Implies relation to westerners (i.e Chumbin), e.g - born in a hospital, in a foreign country etc.
Kipkoech	Chepkoech	Time based; born during the first part of the day (kaech) i.e 5am to 6am
Kiprono	Cherono	Time based; born around dusk (rot nego) i.e 5pm to 6pm

== Last name ==
The tradition of giving a family surname to an individual dates to the colonial period and in most cases the surnames in use today were the second names of the family patriarch of two to four generations ago. Traditionally an individual acquired their father's name after their initiation. Females took on their father's name e.g Cheptoo Kiplagat being the daughter of Kiplagat while males took on just the descriptor portion of the father's name such that the Kiprono son of Kiplagat would become Kiprono arap Lagat.

=== Arap (patronym) ===
Arap is patronym meaning son of. It was traditionally given following the labetab eun (kelab eun) ceremony and all initiates would after the ceremony acquire their father's name e.g Toroitich son of Kimoi and Kipkirui son of Kiprotich would after the ceremony be Toroitich arap Moi and Kipkirui arap Rotich. In modern times it is confined to progressing age-sets independent of the individual initiation ceremony such that if the current age-set is Nyongi, all individuals of preceding age-sets may use the term Arap.

== Nicknames ==
=== Praise names ===
In the past, praise names were sometimes acquired through various acts of courage or community service. A previously common example of the former was Barng'etuny (one who killed a lion).

Among Tugen speakers, initiation/praise names were given after an individual underwent male or female circumcision. These names directly reference a person's unique characteristics, the characteristics of their cattle, or the circumstances of the community during an individual's initiation. With the decreasing prevalence of female circumcision, most Tugen women now do not receive an initiation/praise name.

== See also ==
- Kalenjin Naming System
