= Chirchir =

Chirchir may refer to:

== Geography ==
- Chirchir, Armenia
- Chirchir, Iran, a village in East Azerbaijan Province, Iran
- Chirchir secondary school. Located in Uasin Gishu county in Kenya, near Timboroa.

== People ==
- Cornelius Chirchir (born 1983), Kenyan middle-distance runner and 1998 world junior champion
- Davis Chirchir (born c. 1960), Kenyan politician and Cabinet Secretary for Energy and Petroleum
- Jafred Chirchir Kipchumba (born 1983), Kenyan marathon runner and 2011 Eindhoven Marathon winner
- Selina Chirchir (born 1968), Kenyan middle- and long-distance runner and two-time All-Africa Games champion
- William Chirchir (born 1979), Kenyan middle-distance runner and 1998 world junior champion
- Moses Chirchir (born 1985), Kenyan 800 metres runner for Qatar as Salem Amer Al-Badri

== See also ==
- Kipchirchir, a related Kenyan name
- Jepchirchir, a related Kenyan name
