= Paul Biwott =

Kenyan marathon runner (born 1978)

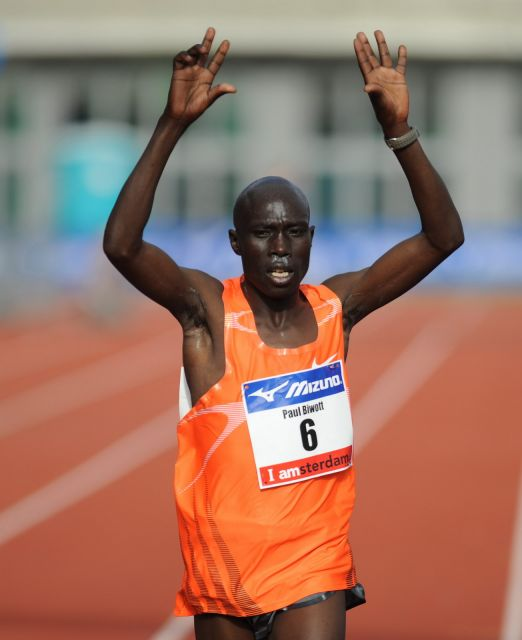
Biwott finishing at the 2009 Amsterdam Marathon

Paul Biwott (born 18 April 1978) is a Kenyan long-distance runner, who specialises in road running, particularly the marathon.

== Biography ==
Among his earliest victories was the 2001 Route du Vin Half Marathon, which he won in a time of 1:03:05. He was the winner of the Marseille-Cassis Classique Internationale in 2003. Biwott took on the marathon distance at the Paris Marathon in 2004 and, in spite of stopping mid-race due to cramp, he continued to record a time of 2:10:30, which was enough for third place behind Ambesse Tolosa and Raymond Kipkoech. He returned to Paris in 2005 and had a personal best run of 2:08.18, finishing second only to Salim Kipsang. He also managed to finish seventh at the 2005 World Championships that year.

At the 2007 Eindhoven Marathon Biwott took second place with a time of 2:09:56, finishing behind Philip Singoei who ran a course record. In 2009, Biwott won the Groet uit Schoorl Half Marathon. In the 2009 season he was third at both the Vienna Marathon and JoongAng Seoul Marathon. Biwott's personal best time is 2:07:02 hours, achieved when he finished third in the 2009 Amsterdam Marathon. He came close to winning the Eindhoven Marathon in October 2010, but was beaten in a sprint finish by both Charles Kamathi and Nicholas Chelimo and took third place behind them by a margin of two seconds.

Biwott was the runner-up behind Hailu Mekonnen at the 2011 Tokyo Marathon. His second marathon outing of the year came at the Amsterdam Marathon, where he ran a personal best of 2:06:54 hours, yet only came sixth in a fast finishing field. He was over three minutes slower at the 2012 Hamburg Marathon and finished in seventh place.
