= Chepchumba =

Chepchumba, or Jepchumba, is a surname of Kenyan origin meaning "daughter of Chumba". It may refer to:

- Beatrice Jepchumba (born 1983), Kenyan long-distance runner
- Joyce Chepchumba (born 1970), Kenyan marathon runner and past winner of the London, Chicago and New York marathons
- Pamela Chepchumba (born 1979), Kenyan half marathon and marathon runner
- Peninah Jepchumba (born 1985), Kenyan middle- and long-distance runner
- Peris Chepchumba (born 1968), Kenyan politician and Member of the National Assembly for the Orange Democratic Movement
- Rose Jepchumba (born 1979), Kenyan long-distance runner
- Salome Chepchumba (born 1982), Kenyan steeplechase runner
- Violah Jepchumba (born 1990), Kenyan half marathon runner

== See also ==
- Kipchumba, related name meaning "son of Chumba"
- Jepchumba, Kenyan artist
