= Kurgat =

Kurgat is a surname of Kenyan origin that may refer to:

- Eliud Kurgat (born 1973), Kenyan long-distance runner and winner of the Tilburg Ten Miles
- Lydia Kurgat (born 1976), Kenyan marathon runner
- Nickson Kurgat (born 1988), Kenyan marathon runner and winner of the Chuncheon Marathon
- Nicholas Kurgat (born 1979), Ugandan long-distance runner and winner of the 2009 Humarathon
- Titus Kurgat (born 1982), Kenyan marathon runner and 2012 winner of the Riga Marathon
- Ronald Kimeli Kurgat (born 1985), Kenyan marathon runner and course record holder of the Jerusalem Marathon
- Sammy Kurgat (born 1975), Kenyan marathon runner and 2008 winner of the Cologne Marathon
- Stanley Kurgat, Kenyan politician and member of parliament for Keiyo South Constituency
