= Langat =

Langat may refer to:

- Langat (surname)
- Langat River, a river in Malaysia
- Langat virus
- Langat (federal constituency), former federal constituency in Selangor, Malaysia

== See also ==
- Lagat, a surname
- Hulu Langat, a district and parliamentary constituency in Malaysia
  - 2011 Hulu Langat landslide
- Kuala Langat, a district in Malaysia
- Istana Daerah Hulu Langat, a palace in Malaysia
- Jalan Ampang-Hulu Langat, a major road in Malaysia
- Jalan Hulu Langat, a major road in Malaysia
- Jalan Kawasan Perindustrian Hulu Langat, a major road in Malaysia
