= Choge =

Choge is a surname of Kenyan origin that may refer to:

- Augustine Kiprono Choge (born 1987), Kenyan long-distance track runner and 2006 Commonwealth Games champion
- Barmani Choge (stage name of Hajiya Sa'adatu Ahmad; 1948–2013), Hausa singer

== See also ==
- Kipchoge, related name meaning "son of Choge"
