= Jelagat =

Jelagat, or Chelagat is a surname of Kenyan origin meaning "daughter of Lagat" that may refer to:

- Irene Jelagat (born 1988), Kenyan middle-distance runner and 2011 All-Africa Games champion
- Janet Jelagat Rono (born 1988), Kenyan marathon runner
- Jemima Jelagat Sumgong (born 1984), Kenyan marathon runner and 2012 Boston Marathon runner-up
- Maureen Jelagat Maiyo (born 1985), Kenyan 400 metres hurdler and 2012 Olympian
- Rose Jelagat Cheruiyot (born 1976), Kenyan long-distance runner and 2006 Amsterdam Marathon champion
- Viola Jelagat Kibiwot (born 1983), Kenyan middle-distance runner

== See also ==
- Alice Chelangat (born 1976), Kenyan marathon runner
- Tete Chelangat (born 1960), Ugandan politician
