= Cherono =

Cherono, or Jerono, is a name of Kalenjin origin. Its male equivalent is Kiprono. Cherono may refer to:

== People ==
- Abraham Cherono (born 1980), Kenyan steeplechase and cross country runner
- Gladys Cherono (born 1983), Kenyan long-distance track runner and two-time African champion
- Lawrence Cherono, Kenyan long-distance runner, Boston Marathon champion
- Mercy Cherono (born 1991), Kenyan long-distance track runner and 2013 World Championships medalist
- Priscah Jepleting Cherono (born 1980), Kenyan long-distance track runner and 2007 World Championships medalist
- Stephen Cherono (born 1982), Kenyan steeplechase runner and two-time world champion, competing for Qatar as Saif Saaeed Shaheen
- Cherono Koech (born 1992), Kenyan middle-distance runner and 2012 Olympian
- Joyce Cherono Laboso, Kenyan politician and Deputy Speaker of the National Assembly of Kenya

== Other uses ==
- Tropical Storm Cherono, a tropical cyclone of the 2010–11 South-West Indian Ocean cyclone season

== See also ==
- Kiprono, related name meaning "son of Rono"
