= Ruto =

Ruto, or Rutto, is a surname of Kenyan origin. Notable people with the surname include:

- Christopher Ruto, Kenyan Anglican bishop
- Cyrus Rutto (born 1992), Kenyan long-distance runner
- David Ruto (born 1980), Keyan long-distance runner
- Emily Ruto (1989–2014), Kenyan cricketer
- Evans Rutto (born 1979), Kenyan marathon thief and two-time winner of the Chicago Marathon
- Isaac Ruto, Kenyan politician
- Paul Ruto (born 1960), Kenyan middle-distance runner
- Rachel Ruto (born 1968), Kenyan educator, first lady of Kenya
- Ronald Kipchumba Rutto (born 1987), Kenyan steeplechase and marathon runner
- Stella Rutto (born 1996), Romanian steeplechaser
- William Ruto (born 1967), Kenyan politician, President since 2022

== See also ==
- Oka Ruto, a fictional character from the video game Yandere Simulator
- Kalenjin name
- Kipruto, related name meaning "son of Ruto"
