= Nicholas Chelimo =

Kenyan long-distance runner (born 1983)

Nicholas Chelimo Kipkorir (born 8 January 1983) is a Kenyan long-distance runner who specialises in road running, including the marathon. He has a personal best of 2:07:38, set at the Eindhoven Marathon in 2010. He took his first win at the 2010 Nagano Marathon and had two straight wins at the Honolulu Marathon. He was the 2013 winner of the Cologne Marathon.

== Career ==
He made his debut over the distance at the Edinburgh Marathon in 2006, finishing in fourth place with a time of 2:17:38. Under the tutelage of former world record holder Paul Tergat, Chelimo significantly improved upon this the following year. He ran a personal best of 2:11:56 for second place at the Belgrade Marathon, finishing three seconds behind John Maluni, and he felt it was clear he needed more training to improve further. He knocked two minutes off his best with of run of 2:09:42 at the JoongAng Seoul Marathon, although this was only enough for fifth place in a quick race won by Joshua Chelanga.

His first marathon of 2008 came at the Twente Marathon, where he was out of the medals with a fifth-place finish. He returned to Seoul for another attempt at the JoongAng Marathon race and the competition developed into a duel between Chelimo and Solomon Molla. He set a best time of 2:08:51 but it was his Ethiopian rival who took the honours, five second ahead. He began his 2009 season at the Daegu Marathon, where he ran 2:10:13 for sixth place. He took part in the Great Scottish Run in Glasgow that September and recorded a time of 1:02:25 for fourth place in the half marathon event. The typically fast Amsterdam Marathon saw Chelimo pitted against top competition. His run of 2:07:46 was another improvement over the distance, but he finished fifth as fellow Kenyans Gilbert Yegon and Elijah Keitany took the top two spots on their event debuts. His third marathon performance of the year came in December at the Honolulu Marathon and he was second behind defending champion Patrick Ivuti.

At the Nagano Marathon he controlled the race, gradually pulling away from the rest of the field to record his first victory over the distance. He came within a fraction of a second win of 2010 at the Eindhoven Marathon: a sprint finish between Chelimo, Charles Kamathi and Paul Biwott left him as runner-up to Kamathi. The winning margin was so narrow that Chelimo's new personal best time of 2:07:38 was the same as that recorded by the winner. He won the Honolulu Marathon in December with a time of 2:15:18 hours. The following year he came sixth at the Vienna City Marathon, but he returned to the top of the marathon podium at the Honolulu race, taking a second consecutive victory.

Chelimo had two marathon outings in 2012, but both were poor ones as he was seventeenth at the Eindhoven Marathon and eighth in Honolulu, failing to break two and a quarter hours on both occasions. The 2013 Los Angeles Marathon saw him return to form with a third-place finish with a time of 2:10:44 hours and the Cologne Marathon saw him return to the top of the podium with his first sub-2:10 marathon in three years (2:09:45).
