= Kiplagat =

Kiplagat (also Kiplangat) is a personal name used by the Kalenjin people in Kenya and Uganda, meaning son born at dusk. The son of Kiplagat would be lagat. This may also mean:

- Benjamin Kiplagat (1989–2023), Ugandan steeplechase runner
- Bisluke Kiplagat (born 1988), Kenyan steeplechase runner
- Boaz Kiplagat Lalang (born 1989), Kenyan middle-distance runner and 2010 Commonwealth Games champion
- Edna Kiplagat (born 1979), Kenyan long-distance runner and two-time world marathon champion
- Esther Kiplagat (born 1966), Kenyan long-distance runner
- Florence Kiplagat (born 1987), Kenyan long-distance runner and half marathon world record breaker
- Hosea Kiplagat (1945–2021), Kenyan businessman and politician
- Hosea Kiplagat Kosgei (born 1989), Kenyan long-distance track runner competing for Bahrain as Aadam Ismaeel Khamis
- Isiah Kiplangat Koech (born 1993), Kenyan long-distance track runner and World Championships medallist
- Kiptanui Kiplagat Jackson, Kenyan politician representing the Orange Democratic Movement
- James Kiplagat Magut (born 1990), Kenyan middle-distance runner
- Julius Kiplagat Yego (born 1989), Kenyan javelin thrower
- Lornah Kiplagat (born 1974), Dutch-Kenyan long-distance runner and multiple half marathon world champion
- Monica Jelimo Kiplagat (born 2000), Kenyan racing cyclist
- Peter Kiplagat Chebet (born 1974), Kenyan marathon runner
- Silas Kiplagat (born 1989), Kenyan middle-distance runner and 2011 World Championships runner-up
- Vincent Kiplangat Kosgei (born 1985), Kenyan Olympic 400 metres hurdler
- William Kiplagat (born 1972), Kenyan long-distance runner and 2003 Amsterdam Marathon winner
- Kiplang'at Kiboi Sakong' (born 1984), linguist and human rights activist
- Kelvin Kiplagat Kipkeu (born 1989), Lawyer and Marine expert https://www.businessdailyafrica.com/bd/markets/capital-markets/kenyatta-university-students-win-stock-investment-contest--2014406 https://allafrica.com/stories/201209210155.html

== See also ==
- Langat (surname), a related Kalenjin surname
