= Jerotich =

Kiprotich or Jerotich (also spelled Cherotich) is a Kalenjin name, common in parts of Kenya and Uganda inhabited by the Kalenjin people. It stems from the term "Rot Tich" which means cattle moving in from pasture which is between 5 pm and 6 pm. The prefix Chep- or Jep-, implies that the bearer is a female and was born while cattle where moving in from pasture. It is closely related to Cherono or Jerono. Its masculine equivalent is Kiprotich.

== Athletes ==
- Cynthia Jerotich Limo (born 1989), Kenyan half marathon runner
- Gladys Jerotich Kipkemoi (born 1986), Kenyan steeplechase runner
- Irene Jerotich Kosgei (born 1974), Kenyan marathon runner
- Purity Cherotich Kirui (born 1991), Kenyan steeplechase runner
- Rose Jerotich Kosgei (born 1981), Kenyan half marathon runner
- Fancy Cherotich (born 1990), Kenyan steeplechase runner

== See also ==
- Rotich
- Kiprotich
