= Jemutai =

Jemutai or Chemutai is a name of Kalenjin origin. It indicates the bearer is a girl or lady born near dawn ("Mutai"). It is closely related to "Chepkoech," " Chelimo," "Chepkorir," and "Chepyego." Its masculine equivalent is Kimutai among the Marakwet, Keiyo, Sabaot, Nandi, and Kipsigis.

== People ==
- Faith Chemutai (born 1980), Kenyan long-distance track runner
- Sharon Jemutai Cherop (born 1984), Kenyan marathon runner
- Lenah Jemutai Cheruiyot (born 1973), Kenyan half marathon runner
- Peruth Chemutai (born 1999), Ugandan steeplechase runner
- Jane Chemutai Goin, Kenyan news journalist
- Albert Chemutai (born 1996), Ugandan steeplechase runner
- Doreen Chemutai (born 1996), Ugandan long-distance runner
- Immaculate Chemutai (born 1987), Ugandan marathon runner
- Fancy Chemutai (born 1995), Kenyan half marathon runner
- Phyllis Chemutai (born 1962), Ugandan politician
- Everlyn Chemutai (born 1976), Ugandan accountant and legislator
