= Kiptanui =

Kiptanui is a surname of Kenyan origin meaning "son of Tanui". Kiptanui means someone who fainted after birth.

It may refer to:

- Jackson Kiptanui, Kenyan politician and National Assembly Member for the Orange Democratic Movement
- Eliud Kiptanui (born 1989), Kenyan marathon runner and 2010 Prague Marathon winner
- Moses Kiptanui (born 1970), Kenyan steeplechaser and three-time world champion
- Timothy Kiptanui (born 1980), Kenyan Olympic middle-distance runner
- Nicholas Kiptanui Bett (born 1996), Kenyan steeplechase runner

== See also ==
- Tanui, origin of name Kiptanui
