= Singelloop =

Singelloop (Dutch for Canal Run) is the name which may refer to a number of road running competitions in the Netherlands:

- Singelloop Enschede, a 5 mile race in Enschede
- Bredase Singelloop, a half marathon race in Breda first held in 1986
- Goudse Singelloop, a 10 km race in Gouda
- Leidse Singelloop, a 6.5-kilometre race first held in Leiden in 1976
- Singelloop Utrecht, a 10 km event in Utrecht first held in 1925
