= Kipruto =

Kipruto is a surname of Kenyan origin meaning "one who likes travelling" or "one who was born on a travel/journey." Notable people with the name include:

- Amos Kipruto (born 1992), Kenyan long-distance runner
- Asbel Kipruto Kiprop (born 1989), Kenyan middle-distance runner and 2008 Olympic champion
- Ben Chebet Kipruto (born 1982), Kenyan marathon runner based in Italy
- Benson Kipruto (born 1991), Kenyan long-distance runner
- Brimin Kipruto (born 1985), Kenyan steeplechase athlete and 2008 Olympic champion
- Collins Kipruto (born 1994), Kenyan middle-distance runner
- Conseslus Kipruto (born 1994), Kenyan steeplechase runner, 2012 World youth champion
- Gilbert Kipruto Kirwa (born 1985), Kenyan runner and winner of the 2009 Vienna and Frankfurt marathons
- Mike Kipruto Kigen (born 1986), Kenyan long-distance track runner
- Rhonex Kipruto (born 1999), Kenyan 10,000 metre runner
- Silas Kipruto (born 1984), Kenyan 5000 metres and half marathon runner
- Vincent Kipruto (born 1987), Kenyan marathon runner

== See also ==
- Kalenjin name
- Ruto, a Kalenjin surname of Kenya
