= Tanui =

Tanui is a surname of Kenyan origin that may refer to:

- Elisha Tanui (born 1983), Kenyan ultrarunner
- Moses Tanui (born 1965), Kenyan long-distance runner and 1991 world champion
- Paul Tanui (born 1990), Kenyan long-distance runner and 2011 World Cross Country runner-up
- William Tanui (born 1964), Kenyan middle-distance runner and 1992 Olympic champion
- William Biwott Tanui (born 1990), Kenyan runner competing as İlham Tanui Özbilen

== See also ==
- Kiptanui, name meaning "son of Tanui"
