= Grzegorz Gajdus =

Polish long-distance runner (born 1967)

Grzegorz Gajdus (born 16 January 1967 in Skórcz, Pomorskie) is a long-distance runner from Poland, who represented his native country at the 1996 Summer Olympics in Atlanta, Georgia. He ran his personal best (2:09:22) in 2003, when he finished in fourth place at the Eindhoven Marathon.

== Marathon achievements ==
Year	Competition	Venue	Position	Notes
Representing Poland
1992	Italian Marathon	Carpi, Italy	1st	2:12:36
1993	London Marathon	London, United Kingdom	3rd	2:11:07
1993	New York Marathon	New York City, United States	9th	2:15:34
1994	London Marathon	London, United Kingdom	5th	2:09:49
1994	European Championships	Helsinki, Finland	17th	2:14:55
1996	Eindhoven Marathon	Eindhoven, Netherlands	2nd	2:11:27
1996	Atlanta Olympic Marathon	Atlanta, Georgia, U.S.	61st	2:23:41
1997	Eindhoven Marathon	Eindhoven, Netherlands	4th	2:13:04
1998	Eindhoven Marathon	Eindhoven, Netherlands	1st	2:10:51
1998	Vienna Marathon	Vienna, Austria	2nd	2:09:45
1999	Zagreb Marathon	Zagreb, Croatia	1st	2:16:40
1999	Lake Biwa Marathon	Lake Biwa, Japan	3rd	2:11:37
2002	Eindhoven Marathon	Eindhoven, Netherlands	2nd	2:10:49
2003	Eindhoven Marathon	Eindhoven, Netherlands	4th	2:09:22 PB
2005	Gdańsk Marathon	Gdańsk, Poland	1st	2:23:47
2005	Warsaw Marathon	Warsaw, Poland	1st	2:14:50
2006	Gdańsk Marathon	Gdańsk, Poland	1st	2:19:40

== See also ==
- Polish records in athletics
