= Boniface Usisivu =

Kenyan long-distance runner

Boniface Usisivu (born September 5, 1974) is a long-distance runner from Kenya, who won the Eindhoven Marathon on October 9, 2005, clocking a total time of 2:08:45.

== Achievements ==
- All results regarding marathon, unless stated otherwise

Year	Competition	Venue	Position	Notes
Representing Kenya
2002	Berlin Marathon	Berlin, Germany	4th	2:07:50
2003	Rome Marathon	Rome, Italy	4th	2:09:11
2004	Honolulu Marathon	Honolulu, Hawaii	4th	2:14:20
2005	Eindhoven Marathon	Eindhoven, Netherlands	1st	2:08:45
