= Els Rens =

Belgian long-distance runner

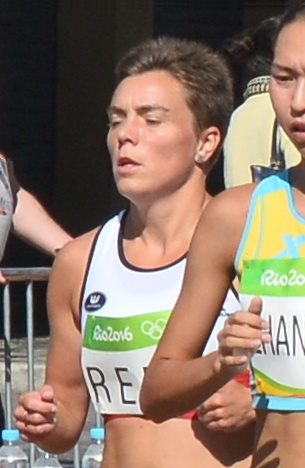
- Rens at the 2016 Olympics

Personal information
- Nationality: Belgian
- Born: 19 February 1983 (age 43) Houtvenne, Antwerp, Belgium
- Height: 160 cm (5 ft 3 in)
- Weight: 51 kg (112 lb)

Sport
- Country: Belgium
- Sport: Track and field
- Event: Marathon
- Club: AC Lyra
- Coached by: Gille Coeckelbergs; Jan Blockx

Achievements and titles
- Personal best: 2:38:16 (2015)

Els Rens (born 19 February 1983) is a Belgian long-distance runner. She finished 84th in the marathon at the 2016 Olympics Rens was the women's winner at the 2015 Eindhoven Marathon.
