= Agnes Hijman =

Dutch long-distance runner (born 1966)

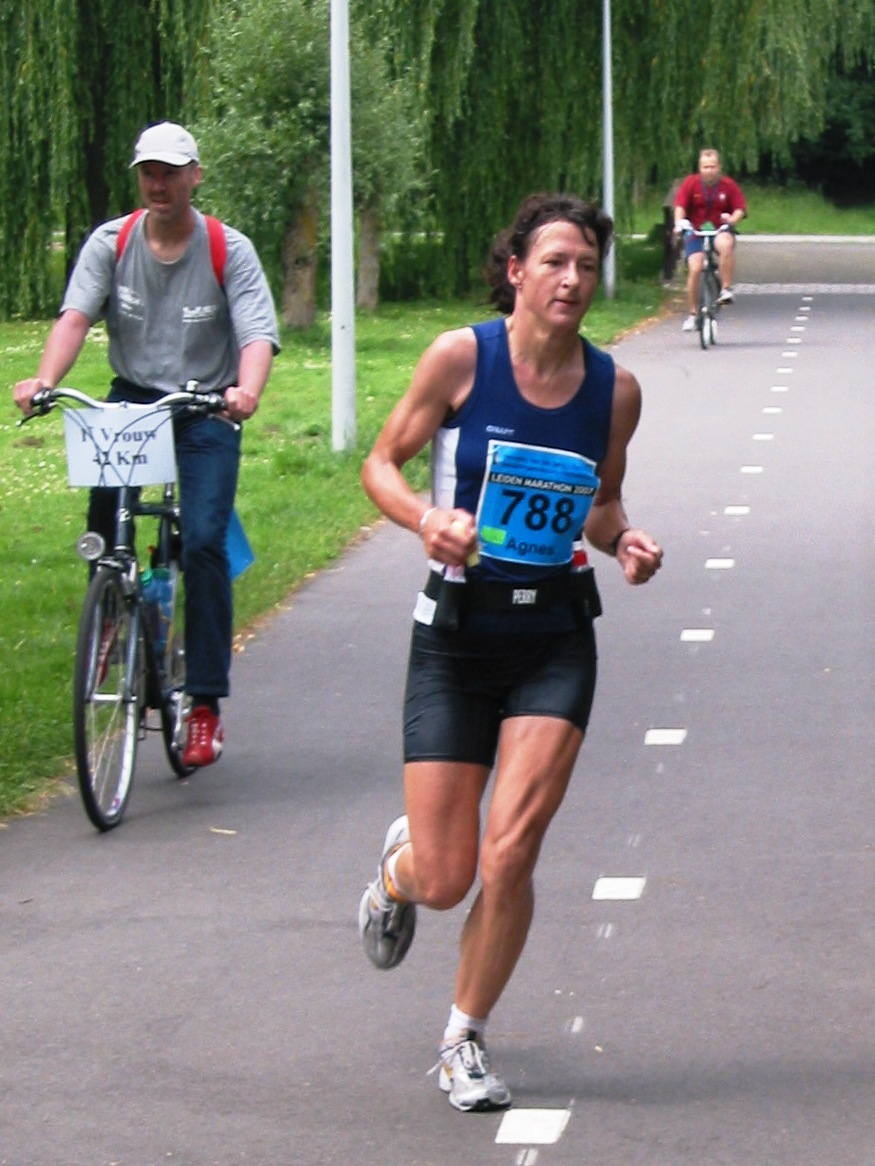
- Agnes Hijman on her way to victory at the Leiden Marathon [nl] in 2007

Personal information
- Born: 17 January 1966 (age 59) Netherlands
- Years active: 1994–2016

Achievements and titles
- Regional finals: 3
- National finals: 1

Agnes Hijman (born 17 January 1966) is a long-distance runner from The Netherlands, who won the Eindhoven Marathon on 8 October 2006, clocking a total time of 2:54:36. She lives in Mijdrecht, and previously won the title in the Amsterdam Marathon, on 24 September 1995 in 2:48:57. She won multiple times the Leiden Marathon.

== Achievements ==
Year	Competition	Venue	Position	Event	Notes
Representing the Netherlands
1995	Amsterdam Marathon	Amsterdam, Netherlands	1st	Marathon	2:48:57
2006	Eindhoven Marathon	Eindhoven, Netherlands	1st	Marathon	2:54:36
