= Mieke Pullen =

Dutch long-distance runner

Mieke Pullen née Hombergen (14 July 1957 – 28 January 2003) was a Dutch long-distance runner who competed mainly in marathon races. She ran thirty races over the distance in her career, winning races in Eindhoven, Amsterdam, Enschede and Singapore. She was a four-time Dutch champion over the distance. She was killed in a traffic accident while training in Haaren, aged 45.

== Career ==
Pullen started her running career relatively late in life, beginning to take athletics seriously at the age of thirty. In spite of this, she had become a top level runner by 1988, when she came third in the Zevenheuvelenloop race and made her marathon debut over at the Eindhoven Marathon, coming fifth. She was runner-up at the 1989 Westland Marathon and the year after she won her first Dutch national title at the Westland race. She had her first victory over the marathon distance in Eindhoven in 1990. She established herself as one of her country's best runners in the event in 1991 when retained her title in Eindhoven and also won at the Amsterdam Marathon.

In 1992 she ran under two hours and forty minutes for the first time, taking fourth place and a second Dutch title at the Rotterdam Marathon in a time of 2:38:06 hours. She improved her best further at the Carpi Marathon, setting a time of 2:37:15 hours in another fourth-place finish. She managed third at the Frankfurt Marathon that year. Pullen did not compete in any marathons in 1993, but won two the following year in Singapore and Zwolle. She reached the podium at the Enschede Marathon, coming third, but did not reach the top ten at the Rotterdam Marathon.

Pullen did not break 2:40:00 at either the Rotterdam or Berlin Marathon races in 1995, but got her first win over the half marathon distance at the Dutch Monster Half Marathon race. She won the 15K VTM Telecomloop race in 1995. She made her American debut at the Boston Marathon in 1996, but her time of 2:41:55 hours left her out of the leading pack. She was that year's winner in Enschede, running a season's best of 2:41:13, and was the runner-up at the Eindhoven and Singapore races. The 1997 season, at the age of 40, was one of her best: she won the Westland and Eindhoven marathons, taking a Dutch title with a lifetime best run of 2:36.51 hours at the latter race. She closed the year with her first win at the Montferland Run 15K – a feat she would repeat the following year. She continued on a career high with a run of 2:39.00 hours for eighth at the 1998 Rotterdam Marathon and retained her Dutch title in Eindhoven, coming second overall behind Romania's Simona Staicu. Other outings on the roads included a runner-up finish at the Oostende Brugge Ten Miles and 11th at the Zevenheuvelenloop.

She was tenth at the 1999 Rome City Marathon and fourth in Eindhoven (recording her final career sub two hours and forty minute marathon with 2:39.47). Pullen had her last race wins in this period: she won the Almere Marathon in 2000 and 2002, and in 2001 she topped the podium at the Groet Uit Schoorl Run and half marathons in Drunen and Eindhoven. She transitioned into the veterans' master athlete category for women over forty. In 1999 and 2000 she won the masters races at the Oostende Brugge and Zevenheuvelenloop races. At the 2001 World Master's Championships in Brisbane, Australia, she won the over-40s women's marathon title. She was a three-time winner of the veteran's race at the Warandeloop cross country.

On 28 January 2003, she was dropped off to train in Haaren by her partner and coach, Gerard Notenboom. While running there she was hit by a car and her body was later discovered in a nearby ditch by Notenboom the following day. Police soon arrested a man who claimed he had noticed he had hit something, stopped and searched with another motorist, but that he had found nothing.
