= Eva Cherono =

Kenyan long-distance runner

Personal information
- Born: 15 August 1996 (age 29) Kericho
- Height: 1.55 m (5 ft 1 in)
- Weight: 41 kg (90 lb)

Sport
- Country: Kenya
- Sport: Athletics
- Event: 5000 metres

Achievements and titles
- Personal best: 5000 m: 14:40.25 (2019)
Medal record
World Athletics Cross Country Championships
| Silver medal – second place | 2019 Aarhus | Team |

Eva Cherono (born 15 August 1996) is a Kenyan professional long-distance runner. Cherono represented Kenya at the 2018 Commonwealth Games and was a team silver medallist at the IAAF World Cross Country Championships in 2019. She has a personal best of 14:40.25 minutes for the 5000 metres.

== Career ==
Born in Kericho, she took up running from a young age and made her first appearance at the Kenyan Athletics Championships at age 14. She was encouraged to take up the sport by her uncle, Johnstone Simotwo, who was a middle-distance runner seven years her senior. Focusing on middle-distance and the steeplechase, she made her international debut at the 2013 African Youth Athletics Championships, placing fifth in the 800 metres and taking a silver medal in the 1500 metres. She gradually moved up the national rankings, with third over 1500 m at the Kenyan under-20 championships in 2014, then runner-up the following year, which led to selection and a fourth-place finish at the 2015 African Junior Athletics Championships.

Cherono moved into the senior ranks in 2016. She was runner-up in the 5000 metres at the Kenyan Championships, but did not replicate that form at the Kenyan World Championships Trials, ending up in eighth. She began to compete on the professional circuit that year, coming second at the Cross de l'Acier. A shift up to longer distances saw her career take off. She was runner-up to world champion Hellen Obiri at the 2018 Kenyan trials for the 2018 Commonwealth Games and finished seventh at the competition in Gold Coast, Australia. She served as a pacemaker for the 2018 European 10,000m Cup before debuting on the European track circuit, competing at the London Grand Prix and British Grand Prix meets plus pacemaking duties at the Weltklasse Zürich final for the 2018 Diamond League. She ended the track season with new personal bests of 8:41.69 minutes for the 3000 metres and 15:09.42 minutes for the 5000 metres. She also had victories over 10,000 metres at the Leiden Gouden Spike (32:34.03 minutes) and the Singelloop Utrecht (31:17 minutes). She closed the year with a win at the Cross Internacional de la Constitución.

A fifth-place finish at the 2019 Kenyan Cross Country Championships earned her selection for the 2019 IAAF World Cross Country Championships. On her world championship debut she placed eighth in the senior race. As the third fastest Kenyan behind winner Hellen Obiri and seventh-placed Beatrice Chepkoech, she helped her country to the team silver medals. Cherono was the winner at the Würzburger Residenzlauf in April, then turned her attention to the track. She greatly improved her 5000 m best to 14:40.25 minutes in London, was third at the Kenyan Championships, and ran in the 2019 Diamond League final at the 2019 Memorial Van Damme. After the track season, she repeated as winner at both the Singelloop Utrecht and Cross Internacional de la Constitución.

== International competitions ==
| Year | Competition | Venue | Position | Event | Notes |
|---|---|---|---|---|---|
| 2013 | African Youth Championships | Warri, Nigeria | 5th | 800 m | 2:13.47 |
| 2013 | African Youth Championships | Warri, Nigeria | 2nd | 1500 m | 4:28.47 |
| 2015 | African Junior Championships | Addis Ababa, Ethiopia | 4th | 1500 m | 4:29.43 |
| 2018 | Commonwealth Games | Gold Coast, Australia | 7th | 5000 m | 15:36.10 |
| 2019 | World Cross Country Championships | Aarhus, Denmark | 8th | Senior race | 37:13 |
| 2019 | World Cross Country Championships | Aarhus, Denmark | 2nd | Team | 25 pts |

== Circuit wins ==
- Singelloop Utrecht: 2018, 2019
- Leiden Gouden Spike: 2018
- Cross Internacional de la Constitución: 2018, 2019

== Personal bests ==
- 3000 metres – 8:41.69 (2018)
- 5000 metres – 14:40.25 (2019)
- 10,000 metres – 32:34.03 (2018)
- 10K run – 30:51 (2019)
