= Willy Cheruiyot Kipkirui =

Kenyan long-distance runner

Willy Cheruiyot Kipkirui (born 24 August 1974), also known as William Cheruiyot, is a long-distance runner from Kenya, who won the Eindhoven Marathon a record four times, in 2000, 2002, 2003 and 2004. He ran his personal best (2:08:48) on 21 May 2000 at the Vienna Marathon.

== Achievements ==
Year	Competition	Venue	Position	Event	Notes
Representing Kenya
2000	Vienna Marathon	Vienna, Austria	1st	Marathon	2:08:48
2000	Eindhoven Marathon	Eindhoven, Netherlands	1st	Marathon	2:09:55
2001	Milan Marathon	Milan, Italy	2nd	Marathon	2:08:58
2002	Eindhoven Marathon	Eindhoven, Netherlands	1st	Marathon	2:10:12
2003	Prague Marathon	Prague, Czech Republic	1st	Marathon	2:11:56
2003	Eindhoven Marathon	Eindhoven, Netherlands	1st	Marathon	2:09:05
2004	Eindhoven Marathon	Eindhoven, Netherlands	1st	Marathon	2:09:20
