= Rono =

Rono is a name of Kenyan origin that may refer to

== People ==
- Alex Kipchirchir Rono (born 1984), Kenyan 800 metres runner and 2006 Commonwealth Games champion
- Chito S. Roño (born 1954), Filipino film director
- Daniel Rono (born 1978), Kenyan marathon runner
- Elly Rono (born 1970), Kenyan marathon runner and two-time California International Marathon winner
- Georgina Rono (born 1980), Kenyan marathon runner and winner of the 2011 Eindhoven Marathon
- Henry Rono (1952-2024), Kenyan former steeplechase runner and former world record holder
- Janet Rono (born 1988), Kenyan marathon runner
- Naomi Rono (born 1982), Kenyan public policy consultant and development economist
- Kipruto Rono Arap Kirwa, Kenyan politician and former Minister for Agriculture
- Peter Rono (born 1967), Kenyan former 1500 metres runner and 1988 Olympic champion
- Robert Rono (born 1978), Kenyan middle-distance runner
- Rono Dutta, former President of United Airlines
- Geoffrey Rono (born 1987), Kenyan middle-distance runner

== Places ==
- Rönö, an island and district in Kuopio, Finland
- Rönö Hundred, was a hundred (administrative division) of Södermanland in Sweden.

== See also ==
- Kiprono, a Kalenjin name meaning "son born when sheep is coming back home from grazing fields" This particularly refer to evening hours.
