= Langat (surname) =

Langat is a surname. Notable people with the surname include:

- Nancy Langat (born 1981), Kenyan middle-distance runner
- Philip Langat (born 1990), Kenyan long-distance road-runner
- Tarık Langat Akdağ (born 1988), Kenyan-born Turkish middle- and long-distance runner born Patrick Kipkirui Langat
- Kiprono Langat, Kenyan politician

== See also ==
- Langat (disambiguation)
- Lagat
