= Kimutai =

Kimutai is a Name of Kalenjin origin. It's indicates that the bearer is a boy and was born near dawn ("Mutai"). It is closely related to "Kipkoech", " Kiplimo", "Kipkorir" and "Kipyego". Its Feminine equivalent is Chemutai among the Marakwet, Keiyo, Sabaot and Kipsigis and Jemutai among the Nandi

== Notable people ==
- Benjamin Kimutai (born 1971), Kenyan marathon runner and 2002 Amsterdam Marathon winner
- David Kimutai (born 1969), Kenyan race walker and 2006 African champion
- David Kimutai Too (1968–2008), Kenyan politician for the Orange Democratic Movement
- Dr. Albert Kimutai (born 1974), Kenyan scientist, entrepreneur, educationist and politician. Currently a senior lecturer of Microbiology at Kabianga University.
- Hellen Jemaiyo Kimutai (born 1977), Kenyan marathon runner and winner of the 2012 Rome Marathon
- James Koskei Kimutai (born 1968), Kenyan marathon runner
- Japheth Kimutai (born 1978), Kenyan middle-distance runner and 1998 African champion
- Julius Kimutai (born 1984), Kenyan road running athlete
- Kiplimo Kimutai (born 1981), Kenyan road running athlete
- Marius Kimutai (born 1992), Kenyan-born Bahraini long-distance runner
- Raymond Kimutai Bett (born 1984), Kenyan marathon runner and two-time winner of the Athens Classic Marathon
- Remmy Kimutai Limo (born 1971), Kenyan triple jumper and Commonwealth Games medallist
- Wesley Ngetich Kimutai (1977–2008), Kenyan marathon runner and two-time winner of Grandma's Marathon
