= Kipchoge =

Kipchoge is a name of Kalenjin origin meaning "of the store (he was born in or near a granary)". The name follows a Kalenjin naming custom where the birth name has to describe the time or place of birth (beginning with the prefix 'kip' or 'chep' or 'che'), physical attributes of the baby, the circumstances surrounding the birth, ancestral reincarnation (referred to as kurenaik/kureneet), initiation rites (referred to as tum/tumin), military exploits (names of this kind begin with the prefix 'Bar' e.g Barsoton) or the family's prized possessions (mainly describing oxen or mules, ending with the suffix 'ei' e.g Samoei, Tororei, Tuwei, etc). Famous people with this name include:

- Eliud Kipchoge (born 1984), Kenyan long-distance track runner, Olympic and world medallist and marathon world-record holder
- Jairus Kipchoge Birech (born 1992), Kenyan steeplechase runner
- Kipchoge Keino (born 1940), Kenyan middle- and long-distance track runner and two-time Olympic champion

== See also ==
- Choge, origin of Kipchoge
