= Everlyn Chemutai =

Ugandan politician

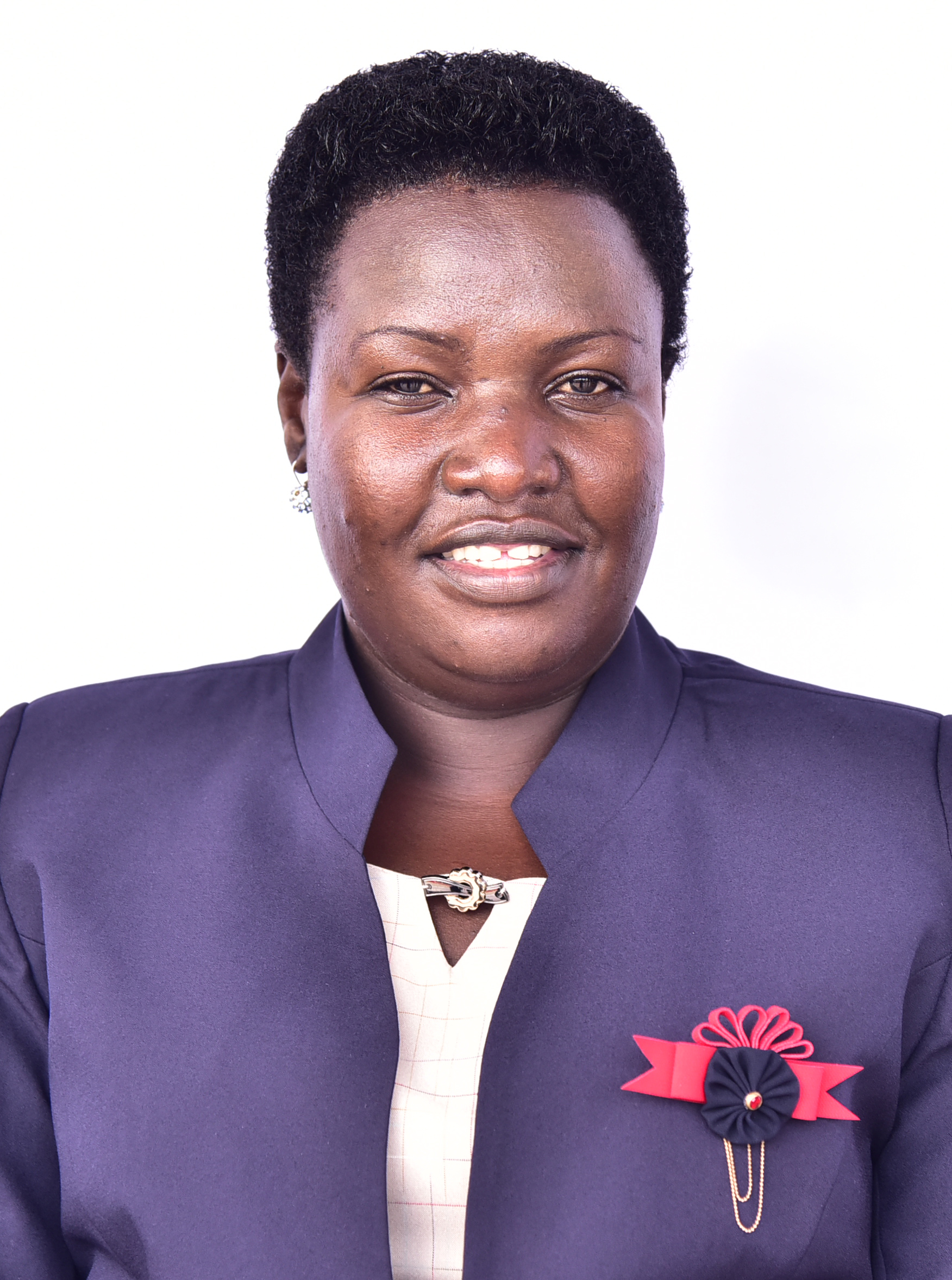
- Born: 12 October 1976 (age 49)
- Citizenship: Ugandan
- Education: Chebinyiny Primary School; Gamatui Girls S.S. Sebei College Tegere; Uganda College of Commerce, Soroti; Makerere University
- Occupations: Accountant and legislator
- Years active: 2016 to date
- Employer(s): Wilcon Enterprises, Soroti; Moroto High School; Africa Leadership Institute; The AIDS support Organization (TASO) Uganda; Parliament of Uganda
- Known for: Politics
- Title: Member of Parliament
- Political party: National Resistance Movement (NRM)

Everlyn Chemutai (born 12 October 1976) is a Ugandan accountant and legislator. She has been the woman representative member of the Parliament of Uganda for the Bukwo District since 2016. She is affiliated with the National Resistance Movement (NRM).

In the 2026 elections, Chemutai lost the Bukwo District Woman MP seat to Evelyn Tete Chelangat (NRM) who serves as the woman member of parliament for Bukwo district in the 12th parliament of Uganda .

== Early life and education ==
Everlyn Chemutai was born on 12 October 1976. She completed her Primary Leaving Examination in 1989 from Chebinyiny Primary School. She completed her Uganda Certificate of Education from Gamatui Girls S.S. in 1993. She then went to Sebei College Tegere from where she completed her Uganda Advanced Certificate of Education in 1997. She was awarded with a Diploma in Business Studies from Uganda College of Commerce, Soroti in 2000. She went for her further studies and she graduated with the degree of Bachelor of Science in Accounting in Makerere University in 2012.

== Work experience ==
Everlyn Chemutai was an Accounts Assistant for Wilcon Enterprises, Soroti from 2001–2002. She became the Bursar for Moroto High School from 2002–2006. She became the Project Accountant for Africa Leadership Institute from 2004 - 2011. She was the Accounts/ Records Assistant for The AIDS support Organization (TASO) Uganda from 2012 -2015. She became the Member of Parliament of Uganda from 2016 to date. She is the vice chairperson for the Committee on HIV/AIDS and Related Matters. She is also a member of the Committee on Agriculture, Animal Industry and Fisheries.

== Other contributions ==
She has Supported Football Leagues, Supported Women Groups, Supported University Students Association within her region.

Everlyn Chemutai participated in the parliamentary session where MPs had to vote on whether to scrap Mobile Money tax or not and she said YES.
