= Rotich =

Rotich is a personal name of Kenyan origin that may refer to:

- Abraham Kipchirchir Rotich (born 1993), Kenyan middle-distance runner
- Bartonjo Rotich (born 1938), Kenyan 400 metres hurdler and sprinter
- Caroline Rotich (born 1984), Kenyan marathon and half marathon runner specialising in the half-marathon
- David Kimutai Rotich (born 1969), Kenyan race walker
- Elisha Rotich (born 1990), Kenyan long-distance runner who specializes in the marathon
- Ferguson Cheruiyot Rotich (born 1989), Kenyan middle-distance runner
- Henry Rotich (born c. 1969), Kenyan civil servant and economist
- Juliana Rotich, Kenyan information technology professional
- Laban Rotich (born 1969), Kenyan middle-distance runner and 1998 Commonwealth Games champion
- Lucas Rotich born 1990), Kenyan long-distance track runner
- Lydia Rotich (born 1988), Kenyan steeplechase runner
- Michael Rotich (born 1978), Kenyan middle-distance runner
- Michael Kosgei Rotich (born 1982), Kenyan road runner and 2003 Paris Marathon winner
- Sammy Kibet Rotich (born 1980), Kenyan marathon runner

== See also ==
- Kiprotich, related name meaning "son of Rotich"
