= Kalenjin Naming System =

Language system of Kenya

The Kalenjin are a Nilotic people living in Kenya. They speak Kalenjin language which is spoken in dialects specific to individual contingent tribes and/or sub-tribes. Their naming system has been subject to westernization and attrition to linguistics due to the Kenyan adoption of Swahili as a lingua franca and the dynamic view that indigenous languages are provincial and irrelevant.

Naming is referred to as Kogoochinet-aab Kainaiik. Names are referred to as kainaiik.

== Masculine names ==
=== First name (Kip/Kib Name) ===
The first name of Kipsigis boys and men is prefixed by the term Kip and then added a suffix descriptive of the prenatal, natal or post-natal places or time or weather and situations. It was to be widely used before initiation and rarely after, only as the mother mourns a dead soldier son or during divorce.

Kip-name	Meaning	Notable people
Kimutai	Of early morning	David Kimutai
Kipng'eno	with the awakening sheep	Moses Kipng'eno Rugut
Kiprono	Of the returning sheep	Moses Kiprono arap Keino, Paul Kiprono Chepkwony, Richard Kiprono Mibey, Kiprono Langat, Robert Kiprono Cheruiyot, Henry Kiprono Kosgey
Kiprotich	Of the returning cattle	Davy Kiprotich Koech
Cheruiyot		John Cheruiyot Korir, Peter Cheruiyot Kirui, Edwin Cheruiyot Soi
Kipsang	Of the open	John Korir Kipsang
Kipchirchir	In haste	William Kipchirchir Samoei Ruto
Kipkalya	During ratification of peace	Kipkalya Kones
Kipsiele	While drinking beer	Paul Kipsiele Koech, Gideon Kipsielei Towett Moi
Kiprugut	Hunger/famine	Wilson Kiprugut

=== Patronymic 'Araap' surname ===
After boys were initiated as older teenagers or young adults, they would come out as having achieved citizenship of the Kipsigis jurisdiction and would be accorded a patronymic surname derived from the first name of the father. For instance, if the father is named Kiptoo, his son after being initiated is accorded the name Araap Too.

== Feminine names ==
=== First name (Che/Chep names) ===
Chep- name	Meaning	Notable people
Chepng'eno	with the awakening sheep	Hellen Chepngeno
Chebeet	Of the daytime	Emily Chebet
Cherono	Of the returning sheep	Joyce Cherono Laboso, Mercy Cherono
Chepkirui/Chepkurui	Of the sleep-time	Gladys Chepkirui Ngetich, Lineth Chepkurui
Chepchumba		Joyce Chepchumba

=== Other female names ===
A woman unable to have children could marry another woman through the custom of kitunji toloj to ensure that she had children to pass on her property to. She is thus taken for a "man" i.e. had to pay for dowry. She is then referred to as Chemenjo or Chepotipiik.
