= Tete Chelangat =

Ugandan Member of Parliament

- Born: 6 August 1960 (age 66)
- Citizenship: Ugandan
- Education: Nsamizi Institute (Mpigi)
- Occupations: Social worker and politician
- Organization: Parliament of Uganda
- Known for: Politics
- Political party: National Resistance Movement

Eveline Tete Chelangat (born 6 August 1960) is a Ugandan politician. Her tribe is Sabiny She was elected Member of Parliament . She represents Bukwo Kongasis Constituency. She is a member of the National Resistance Movement Party.

== Early life ==
She attended Bukwo Primary School. She enrolled in Kidetok Girls School, Serere for her O level. She enrolled in Sebei college, Tegeres. She holds a degree in social work from Nsamizi Institute (Mpigi). She is a social worker by profession and a Pentecostal by religion.

== Career ==
Chelangat joined politics and started as District Councilor LC5, in 2006. Bukwo District officially became a district and she was elected women Representative to Parliament of Uganda under National Resistance Movement to 2016.
