= Kipchirchir =

Kipchirchir is a name used among the Kalenjin people that means the bearer is a man and was "born after a short labour" as the term "Chirchir" implies haste. Its feminine equivalent is Chepchirchir.

== Notable people ==
=== Athletes ===
- Alex Kipchirchir (born 1984), Kenyan middle-distance runner and 2006 Commonwealth Games champion
- Emmanuel Kipchirchir Mutai (born 1984), Kenyan marathon runner and 2011 London Marathon winner
- Daniel Kipchirchir Komen (born 1984), Kenyan middle-distance runner and two-time world indoor runner-up
- Abraham Kipchirchir Rotich (born 1993), Kenyan 800 metres runner
- Bernard Kipchirchir Lagat (born 1974), Kenyan middle- and long-distance runner and two-time world champion competing for the United States

=== Politicians ===
- William Kipchirchir Samoei arap Ruto (born 1966), President of Kenya

== See also ==
- Chirchir (disambiguation), origin of the name Kipchirchir
