= Chepkoech =

Chepkoech is a Kenyan surname. The name means born in the early morning.

Notable people with the surname include:

- Beatrice Chepkoech (born 1991), Kenyan long-distance runner
- Caroline Chepkoech Kipkirui (born 1994), Kenyan-Kazakhstani long-distance runner
- Jackline Chepkoech (born 2003), Kenyan steeplechase runner
- Joyce Chepkoech Korir, Kenyan politician
