= Istana Daerah Hulu Langat =

Palace in Malaysia

General information
- Location: Ampang, Selangor, Malaysia
- Year built: 1990

The Istana Daerah Hulu Langat is a palace in Ampang, Selangor, Malaysia, located near apartments along Jalan Kosas Utama, opposite the Ampang Waterfront. It is the official residence of the Yang-Amat Berbahagia Tengku Mahkota of Hulu Langat, a member of the Selangor royal family.

The palace was built in 1990 and has been undergoing major renovations since 2010. It will reopen at the end of 2012.

The residence was originally separated apartments, with each connected to the other by short and narrow passageways. The palace is not normally open to the public, although the beautiful gardens around it can be viewed from outside.

== Ruled by ==
This palace is ruled by Tengku Mahkota Ayahanda Tuan Nor Zilan and his son, Putera Sulong Anakanda Nor Izwan Izzat will take his place when the palace finished with its renovation in the end of 2012 followed by Putera kedua Anakanda Nor Muhammad Hadi after five years of service in the palace.

== Floor plan ==
This palace has its own Main Hall of Istana Derah (Dewan Utama Istana Daerah), Dining Hall (Dewan Santapan), Surau, Office and some private halls for its residences. Its all located on the first floor of this palace. The main area for the house is located at the second floor connected by the main stairs at the den.

== Style ==
Putera Sulong has chosen the goldish yellow for the paint indicates it is a royal palace constitutional. The furniture was originally imported from overseas like Indonesia, Singapore, Thailand and China.

== Facilities ==
The Main Hall is usually used for official ceremonies. The Dining Hall can fit about 10 people and is decorated with the royal palace constitutional. The palace's surau can accommodate 30 people at one time. Offices are used for the palace's staff, such as for preparing official documents.
