= Lydia Kurgat =

Kenyan long-distance runner (born 1976)

Lydia Kurgat (born 1976) is a Kenyan long distance runner who specialises in marathon running. She is a two-time winner of the Eindhoven Marathon and has also won races in Bonn, Utrecht and Ljubljana. Her personal best for the distance is 2:31:26 hours.

== Biography ==
She began her career as a steeplechase specialist, but then switched to road running events. She was the 2002 winner of the VTM Telecomloop 15 km race in the Netherlands, then won the Trierer Stadtlauf in Germany in 2003.

She made her debut over the marathon distance in 2006, running at the Niagara Falls Marathon in Canada, where she finished third. On her second outing that year, she won the Great Lakes Marathon in Kenya with a personal best and course record of 2:40:45 hours. She improved this further at the 2007 Eindhoven Marathon, as she won her first European race in 2:39:27 hours ahead of Tabitha Kibet. Kurgat won the Bonn Marathon the year after then repeated as the Eindhoven champion, where she significantly improved her best to 2:33:39 hours and had a winning margin of over three minutes.

Kurgat extended her unbeaten marathon streak to five races at the 2009 Utrecht Marathon. She aimed to make it three successive wins at the Eindhoven race that same year, but lost to fellow Kenyan Beata Naigambo, although her time of 2:31:26 hours as the runner-up was a new best. She also set a half marathon best of 1:12:54 hours with a third-place finish in Zwolle that year.

She ran at the 2010 Houston Marathon, coming fifth, then returned to her winning ways in 2011 at the Ljubljana Marathon.
