= Charles Kamathi =

Kenyan long-distance runner (born 1978)

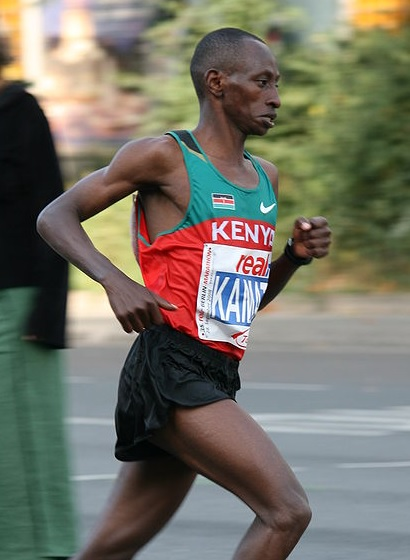
- Kamathi at the Berlin Marathon in 2008

Medal record

Men's athletics

Representing Kenya

World Championships
Gold medal – first place	2001 Edmonton	10,000 m

African Championships
Gold medal – first place	2004 Brazzaville	10,000 m

Charles Wawerū Kamathi (born 18 May 1978, near Nyeri, Kenya) is a Kenyan long-distance runner. He is best known for winning the 10,000 metres distance at the 2001 World Championships in Edmonton.

== Career ==
=== Early life and career ===
Kamathi started running in 1995. He graduated from Njogu-Ini Secondary School in 1996. In 1997 he went to run for Toyota club in Japan but had to leave back home only after days later due to tendinitis and Toyota replaced him with Simon Maina. Kamathi joined Kenya Police in 1998. On 3 September 1999 he made his international breakthrough by winning a 10000-meter race at the Memorial Van Damme meeting in Brussels by running 26:51.49, then the fifth best time ever and the world's fastest time in 1999.

Following this, he took to the European cross-country running circuit and beat multiple world champion Paul Tergat three times, taking victories at the Almond Blossom Cross Country, Cross Internacional de Itálica and Cinque Mulini race. Despite a poor finish at the Kenya World trials event, he was selected for the 2000 IAAF World Cross Country Championships. He did not live up to his circuit form and was in seventh place in the long race, behind four of his compatriots. His 2000 season was hampered by a hamstring injury and he did not managed to make the Kenyan team for the 2000 Summer Olympics.

=== World champion ===
Fully recovered, he returned to the European cross-country meets and won again at the Cinque Mulini and Itálica races. He qualified for the 2001 IAAF World Cross Country Championships and won his first major medal in the men's long race. Kamathi won the bronze medal (behind Mohammed Mourhit and Serhiy Lebid) and led a Kenyan team, which included Paul Kosgei and Patrick Ivuti to the team gold medal. An even greater achievement awaited him at the 2001 World Championships in Athletics. He took on defending world champion Haile Gebrselassie in the 10,000 m and managed to beat both him and Olympic medalist Assefa Mezgebu to the line in the final lap, taking the world gold medal in the event. The victory, in which Kamathi sprinted from fourth to first in the final 200 metres, broke Haile's undefeated streak of 37 races.

In September he competed at the 10-mile Dam tot Damloop in the Netherlands and managed to win the race in a time of 46:05 minutes.

== Marathon running ==
He made his marathon debut at the 2007 Milan Marathon and finished fourth by running 2:11:25. He finished third at his second marathon, the 2008 Rotterdam Marathon and bettered his personal record to 2:07:33. He ran at the Milan Marathon in April 2010 but suffered cramps at the 30 km point and finished in second place. He entered the Eindhoven Marathon in October and had a close battle with Nicholas Chelimo and Paul Biwott at the finish. Kamathi just pipped Chelimo at the line to win the race, recording a time of 2:07:38 – the same as the runner-up.

== Personal life ==
He is from the Kikuyu tribe. His manager is Federico Rosa, and his coach is Gabriele Rosa.

== International competitions ==
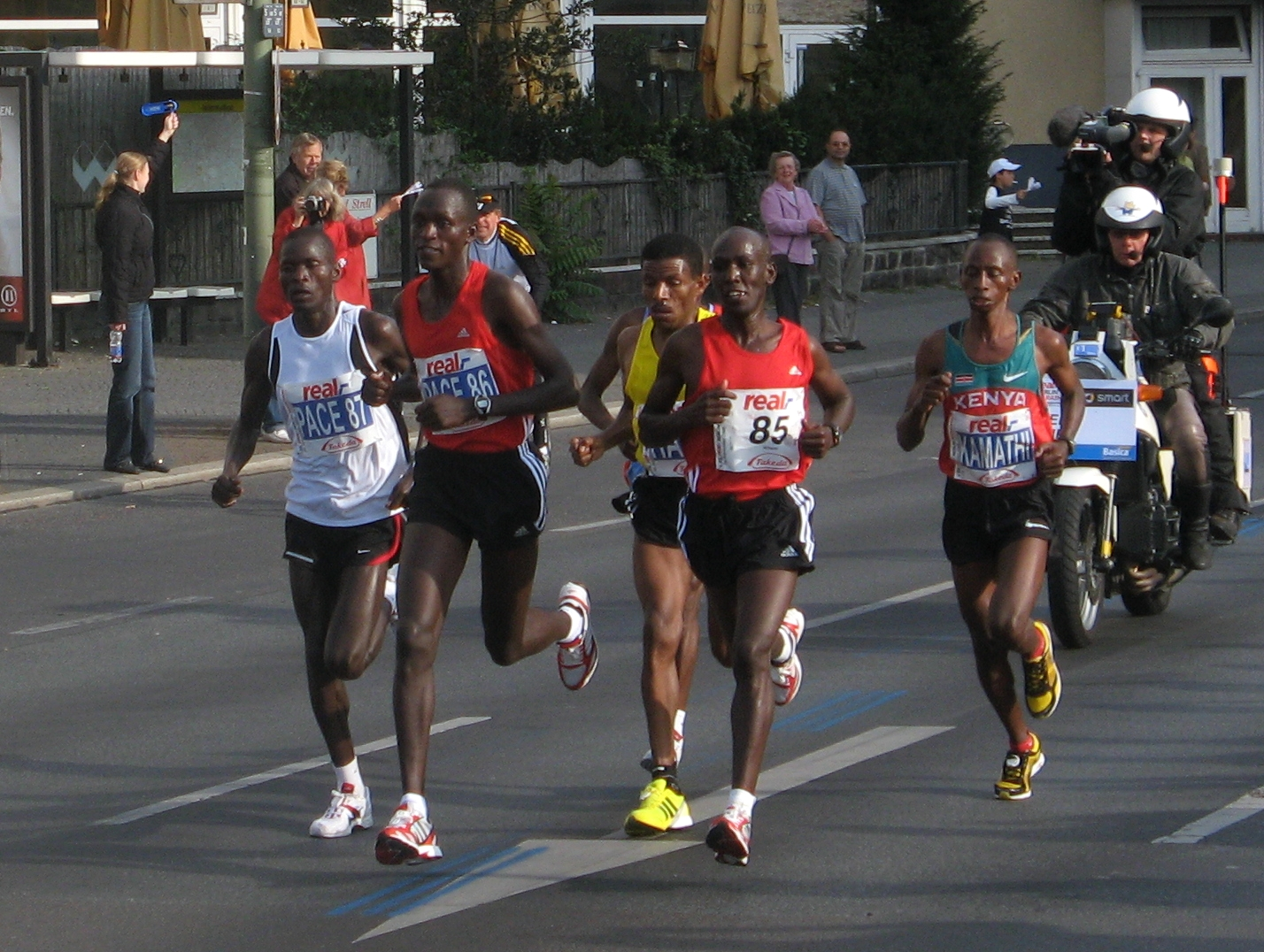
Kamathi (right) with the leading pack at the Berlin Marathon

Year	Competition	Venue	Position	Event
2000	World Cross Country Championships	Vilamoura, Portugal	7th	Long race
2001	World Championships	Edmonton, Canada	1st	10,000 m
2001	World Cross Country Championships	Ostend, Belgium	3rd	Long race
2002	IAAF World Half Marathon Championships	Brussels, Belgium	9th	Half marathon
2002	World Cross Country Championships	Dublin, Ireland	5th	Long race
2003	World Championships	Paris, France	7th	10,000 m
2003	World Athletics Final	Monte Carlo, Monaco	8th	5000 m
2004	Olympic Games	Athens, Greece	13th	10,000 m
2004	World Cross Country Championships	Brussels, Belgium	5th	Long race
2004	World Athletics Final	Monte Carlo, Monaco	7th	5000 m
2004	African Championships	Brazzaville, Congo	1st	10,000 m
2005	World Championships	Helsinki, Finland	12th	10,000 m
2005	World Cross Country Championships	Saint-Étienne- Saint-Galmier, France	10th	Long race

== Personal bests ==
- 3000 metres - 7:41.89 (2003)
- 5000 metres - 13:02.51 (2002)
- 10,000 metres - 26:51.49 (1999)
- Half marathon - 1:00:22 (2002)
- Marathon - 2:07:33 (2008)
