= Chepkwony =

Chepkwony is a name of Kenyan origin from the Kalenjin community. Notable persons in Kenya with these name include:

- Caroline Chepkwony (born 1985), Kenyan long-distance road runner
- Franklin Chepkwony (born 1984), Kenyan marathon runner
- John Chepkwony Kipkoech (born 1991), Kenyan long-distance track runner
- Julius Chepkwony (born 1969), Kenyan Olympic sprinter (see Athletics at the 2000 Summer Olympics – Men's 4 × 400 metres relay)
- Paul Kiprono Chepkwony, former Governor of Kericho County
- Captain Stanley Kiprotich Chepkwony, Pilot, Kenya Airways
