= Jafred Chirchir Kipchumba =

Kenyan long-distance runner

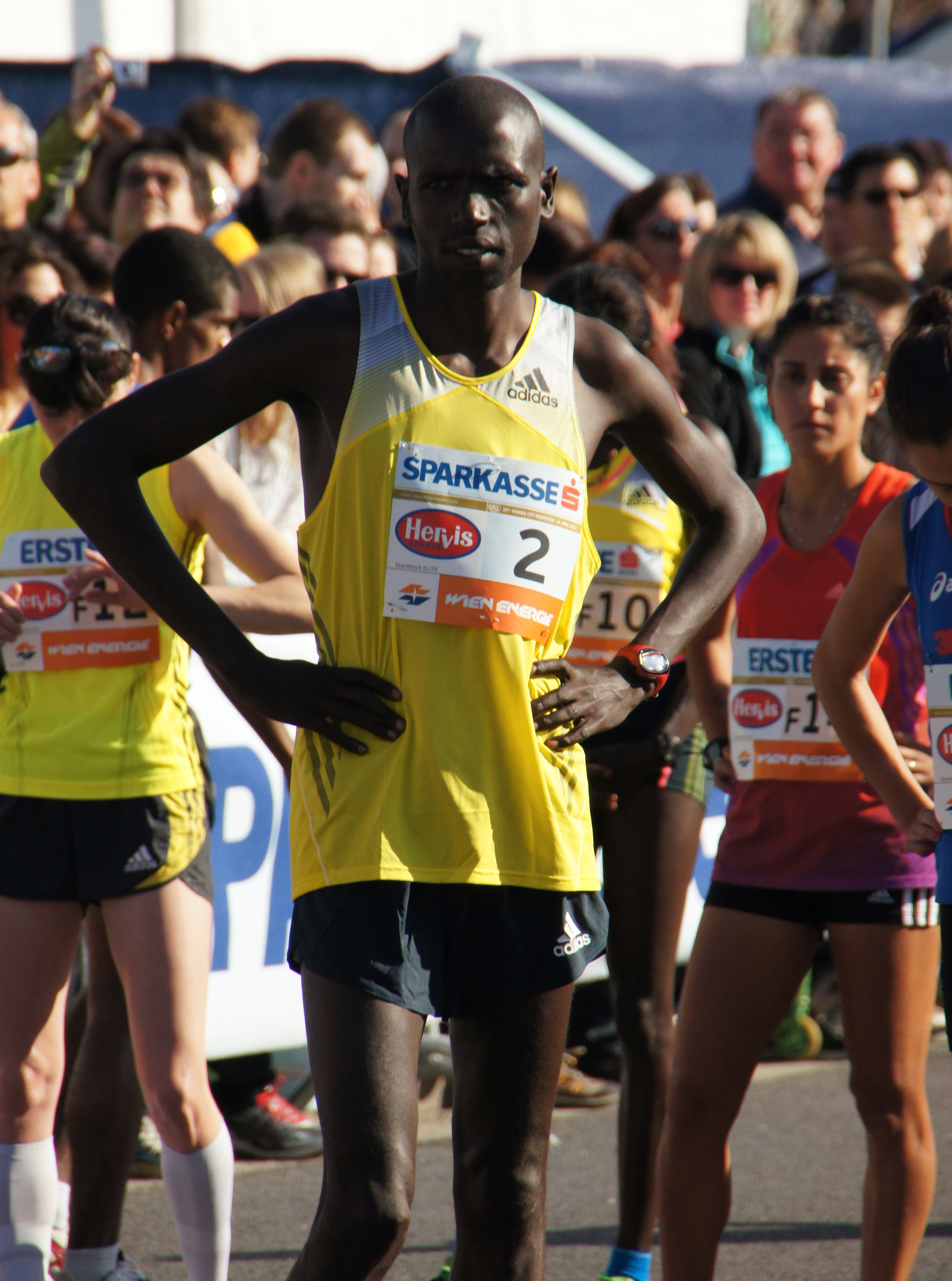
Kipchumba, 2013.

Jafred Chirchir Kipchumba (born 8 August 1983) is a Kenyan long-distance runner who specialises in the marathon. He won the 2011 Eindhoven Marathon in a personal best time of 2:05:48 hours.

== Biography ==
Hailing from Keiyo District in Kenya, he began training for marathon running in 2003. He made his first competitive appearance over the classic distance at an all-debutant version of the Vienna City Marathon in 2009. He finished in sixth place with a time of 2:10:42 hours. He again finished sixth at the Istanbul Eurasia Marathon in October later that year.

In his fourth outing over the 42.195 km distance, Kipchumba had his first competitive win. He defeated former world champion Charles Kamathi to win the Milano City Marathon in a personal best time of 2:10:42 hours and later declared that he himself had not expected to win the competition. He improved his time further at the Toronto Waterfront Marathon where he crossed the line after 2:08:09 hours to take the runner-up spot behind Kenneth Mungara, who ran the fastest time ever set in Canada. He made a significant career breakthrough at the 2011 Eindhoven Marathon: he ran a course record time of 2:05:48 hours, beating the previous course record by over a minute (Geoffrey Mutai's 2:07:01 from 2009). He was surprised by his achievement, stating after the race: "I was only thinking about running 2:07. I was not confident I was going to run faster".

He trains with Geoffrey Mutai, who won the 2011 Boston Marathon in a world's fastest time.
