= Chumba (disambiguation) =

Chumba is a type of Garifuna music.

Chumba may also refer to:

== People ==
- Dickson Chumba (born 1986), Kenyan marathon runner
- Eunice Chumba (born 1993), Kenyan-born Bahraini long-distance runner
- Linus Chumba (born 1980), Kenyan long-distance runner
- Peter Chumba (born 1968), Kenyan former long-distance runner
- Sammy Chumba (born 1978), two-time winner of the 20 Kilomètres de Paris

== Places ==
- Chumba, Tibet, a village

== See also ==
- Chumba/Nubri, a new Nepalese caste recognized by the 2021 census - see Ethnic groups in Nepal
- Kipchumba, Kenyan name meaning "son of Chumba"
