= Chelanga =

Chelanga is a surname of Kenyan origin that may refer to:

- Joshua Chelanga (born 1973), Kenyan marathon runner and older brother of Sam
- Sam Chelanga (born 1985), Kenyan long-distance runner and American collegiate record holder
