= Keiyo South Constituency =

Kenyan electoral constituency

Keiyo South
- constituency for the Parliament of Kenya
- Keiyo South Constituency within Elgeyo-Marakwet County

- Elgeyo-Marakwet County within Kenya
- County: Elgeyo-Marakwet
- Population: 120,750
- Area: 898 km^{2} (346.7 sq mi)

Current constituency
- Number of members: 1
- Party: UDA
- Member of Parliament: Gideon Kimaiyo Kipkoech
- Wards: 6

Keiyo South is an electoral constituency in Kenya. It is one of four constituencies of Elgeyo-Marakwet County. The constituency has 6 wards, all of which elect a Member of County Assembly (MCA) for Elgeyo Marakwet County which sits in the county Headquarters, Iten. The wards are namely: Metkei, Kabiemit, Chepkorio, Soy South and Kaptarakwa. The constituency was established for the 1969 elections, one of two constituencies of the former Keiyo District.

== Members of Parliament ==
Elections	MP	Party	Notes
1969	Stanley Kurgat	KANU	One-party system
1974	Stanley Kurgat	KANU	One-party system
1979	Nicholas Biwott	KANU	One-party system
1983	Nicholas Biwott	KANU	One-party system.
1988	Nicholas Biwott	KANU	One-party system.
1992	Nicholas Biwott	KANU	
1997	Nicholas Biwott	KANU	
2002	Nicholas Biwott	KANU	
2007	Jackson Kiptanui	ODM	
2013	Jackson Kiptanui	URP	
2017	Daniel Rono	Jubilee	
2022	Gideon Kimaiyo	UDA	

== Locations and wards ==
Locations
Location	Population*
Chemoibon	4,819
Chepsigot	2,244
Epke	2,353
Kabiemit	6,731
Kamwosor	6,774
Kapkwony	2,556
Kaptarakwa	5,411
Kibargoi	4,802
Kitany	7,226
Kocholwo	6,865
Maoi	5,640
Marichor	15,196
Metkei	3,285
Mosop	7,754
Nyaru	8,933
Soy	10,544
Tumeiyo	5,213
Total	x
1999 census.

Wards
Ward	Registered Voters
Chemoibon	1,941
Chepsigot	1,835
Kabiemit	2,699
Kamwosor	2,773
Kaptarakwa	2,728
Kibargoi	2,071
Kitany	2,848
Kocholwo	2,701
Maoi	1,942
Marichor	6,196
Metkei	2,270
Mosop	2,386
Nyaru	2,821
Soy ward	3,922
Tumeiyo	1,929
Total	41,062
*September 2005.
