= Philip Singoei =

Kenyan long-distance runner

Philip Singoei (born December 31, 1975) is a long-distance runner from Kenya, who won the Eindhoven Marathon on October 8, 2006, clocking a total time of 2:08:18.

== Achievements ==
- All results regarding marathon, unless stated otherwise

| Year | Competition | Venue | Position | Notes |
Representing Kenya
| 2004 | Eindhoven Marathon | Eindhoven, Netherlands | 2nd | 2:10:07 |
| 2005 | Eindhoven Marathon | Eindhoven, Netherlands | 2nd | 2:08:45 |
| 2006 | Paris Marathon | Paris, France | 7th | 2:10:11 |
| 2006 | Eindhoven Marathon | Eindhoven, Netherlands | 1st | 2:08:18 |
| 2007 | Eindhoven Marathon | Eindhoven, Netherlands | 1st | 2:07:57 |
| 2008 | Rome City Marathon | Rome, Italy | 10th | 2:12:05 |
| 2009 | Taipei International Marathon | Taipei, Taiwan | 6th | 2:23:12 |
