= Jane Chemutai Goin =

Kenyan journalist

Chemutai Goin
- Occupation: Journalist

Jane Chemutai Goin is a former Kenyan journalist who worked as television reporter at Citizen TV. She reported mainly on areas of politics and current affairs. She currently works at Kenya's parliament in the National Assembly.

== Life and career ==
Chemutai started as an intern at Kenya Television Network (KTN) where she became interested in political reporting. She then joined Capital FM as a reporter, and also worked for Media Max as a political reporter at K24 TV, before becoming a reporter for Citizen TV.

She has published news stories for Citizen TV's news portal, focusing on political and health news.

== Awards ==
Presidential Awards- On 1 June 2020 (Madaraka Day), Chemutai was among the journalists given a state commendation in helping the country and creating awareness regarding the coronavirus disease. The award, known as "Uzalendo Award" was given by President Uhuru Kenyatta while addressing the nation. He acknowledged Chemutai among the ten journalists who had spearheaded and exhibited great efforts during the COVID-19 pandemic.
