= Cheruiyot =

Cheruiyot is a surname of the Kalenjin people of Kenya's Rift valley. Notable people with the surname include:

- Charles Cheruiyot (born 1964), Kenyan long-distance runner
- Charles Cheruiyot (born 1988), Kenyan long-distance runner
- Charles Cheruiyot Keter, Kenyan politician
- Evans Cheruiyot (born 1982), Kenyan marathon runner, winner of the Chicago Marathon 2008
- Jonas Cheruiyot (born 1984), Kenyan long-distance runner
- Kenneth Cheruiyot (born 1974), Kenyan marathon runner
- Kipkoech Cheruiyot (born 1964), Kenyan middle-distance runner, brother of Charles
- Reynold Cheruiyot (born 2004), Kenyan middle-distance runner, 2022 world under-20 1500m gold medalist
- Robert Kipkoech Cheruiyot (born 1978), Kenyan marathon runner, four-time winner of the Boston Marathon
- Robert Kiprono Cheruiyot (born 1988), Kenyan marathon runner, winner of the Boston Marathon 2010
- Robert Kiprotich Cheruiyot (born 1974), Kenyan marathon runner
- Rose Cheruiyot (born 1976), Kenyan runner
- Timothy Cheruiyot (born 1995), Kenyan middle-distance runner, 2019 World Championships 1500m gold medalist
- Vivian Cheruiyot (born 1983), Kenyan long-distance runner, 2016 Olympic 5000m gold medalist
- Zakayo Cheruiyot (born 1954), Kenyan politician
