= Singelloop Utrecht =

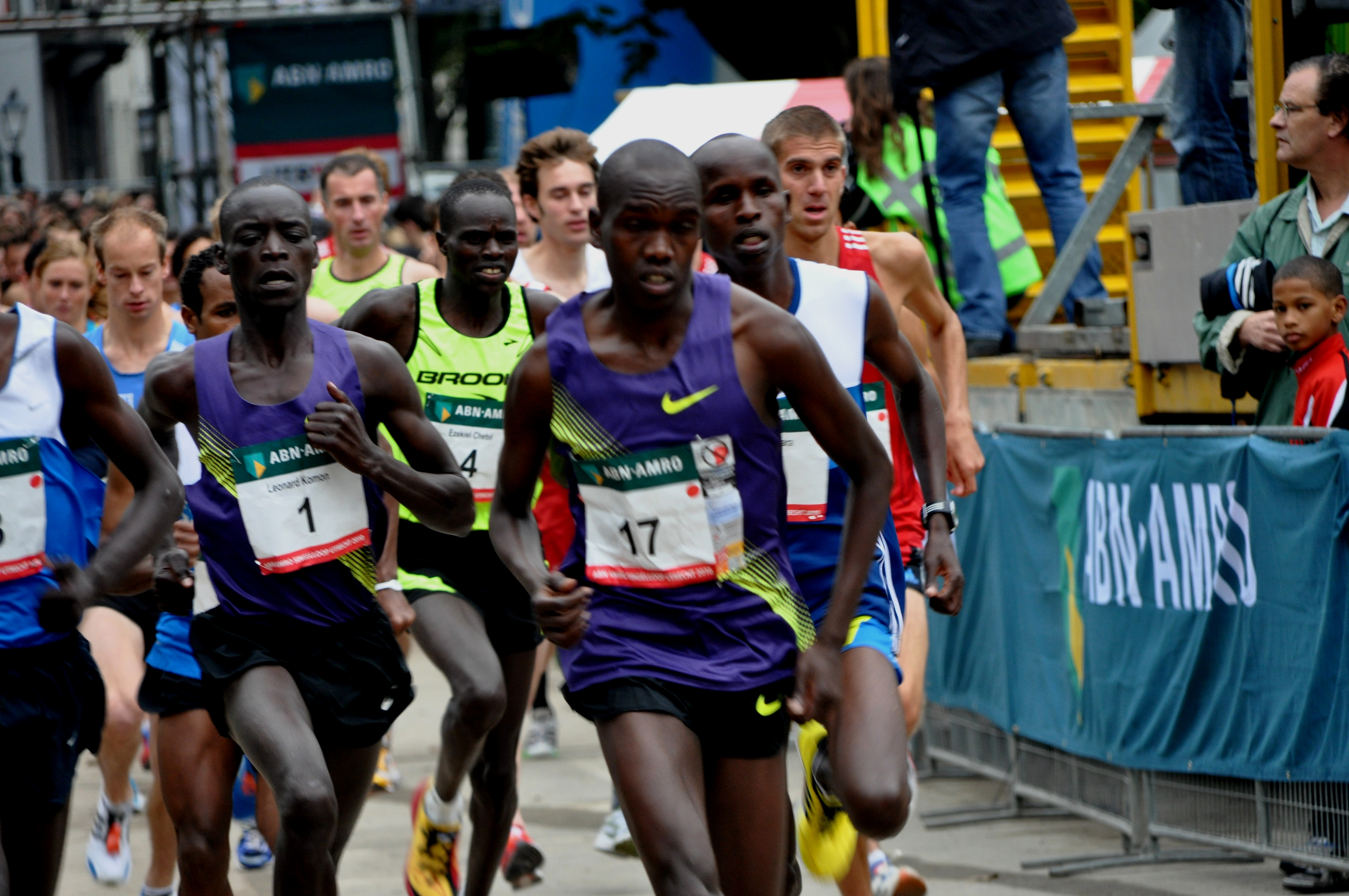
- The 2010 elite men's race – Leonard Komon (left) set a world record
- Date: September/October
- Location: Utrecht, Netherlands
- Event type: Road
- Distance: 10 kilometres
- Established: 1925
- Website: Singelloop Utrecht

The Singelloop Utrecht is an annual road running event over 10 kilometres (6.2 mi) which takes place on the streets of city of Utrecht in the Netherlands. It is typically held in either September or October

The competition, which roughly translates as the Utrecht Canal Run, was initiated by Nico Munzert and had its first edition on 30 May 1925. The race, which followed the banks of Utrecht's canals over a 4700-metre-long course, had garnered over 100 participants by 1931, but the crowds of spectators were much larger with over 75,000 people gathering to witness the event. The length of the race was extended in 1937, but the event suffered interruption in this period, being absent between 1940 and 1946 due to World War II and undergoing cancellations in 1950 and 1955. The 25th edition of the race was held in 1956.

The Singelloop was forced from its original course in the 1960s due to the increase in traffic in the city. Runners instead held the race in Wilhelminapark. The competition attracted top level Dutch runners in the 1970s: Klaas Lok won in 1974, Rob Druppers took the 1975 title, then Gerard Tebroke defeated an injured Jos Hermens to win the 1976 race. The race acquired its long-running course format of two 5-kilometre laps in 1978. Gerard Nijboer won the 1979 competition.

Following in the trend of greater public participation in European road races at the time, the field of the Singelloop grew in size: some 3000 people entered the race in 1979 and by 1986 this figure had reached around 3500 runners. Dutch steeplechaser Simon Vroemen was the 1993 winner and the Singelloop celebrated its 50th edition the following year – a fact which underlined its position as the oldest road race in the country. The race organisers HERMES encountered problems with volunteer recruitment in 2001 and as a result the race was made defunct.

However, it was revived again six years later under the organisation of the Athletic Sports Exhibition Company and the 2007 competition saw top international runners feature for the first time. Dutch finance company Fortis was the race title sponsor from 2007 to 2009, then the state bank ABN AMRO took over sponsorship in 2010. Kenya's Leonard Komon built the race's reputation as a fast course by running the sixth fastest time ever to win in 2009, then took this further the next year with a win in a time of 26:44 minutes – improving the 10K road world record by seventeen seconds. Kenya's Winnie Jepkemoi brought the women's course record down by almost half a minute at the 2011 edition, winning in 31:32 minutes. Joyce Chepkirui improved this by eleven seconds in 2013.

The current course for the Singelloop has a singular clock-wise loop format within the city, which begins near Lepelenburg Park, passes along Utrecht's canals, then finishes near Wilhelminapark.

== Winners ==
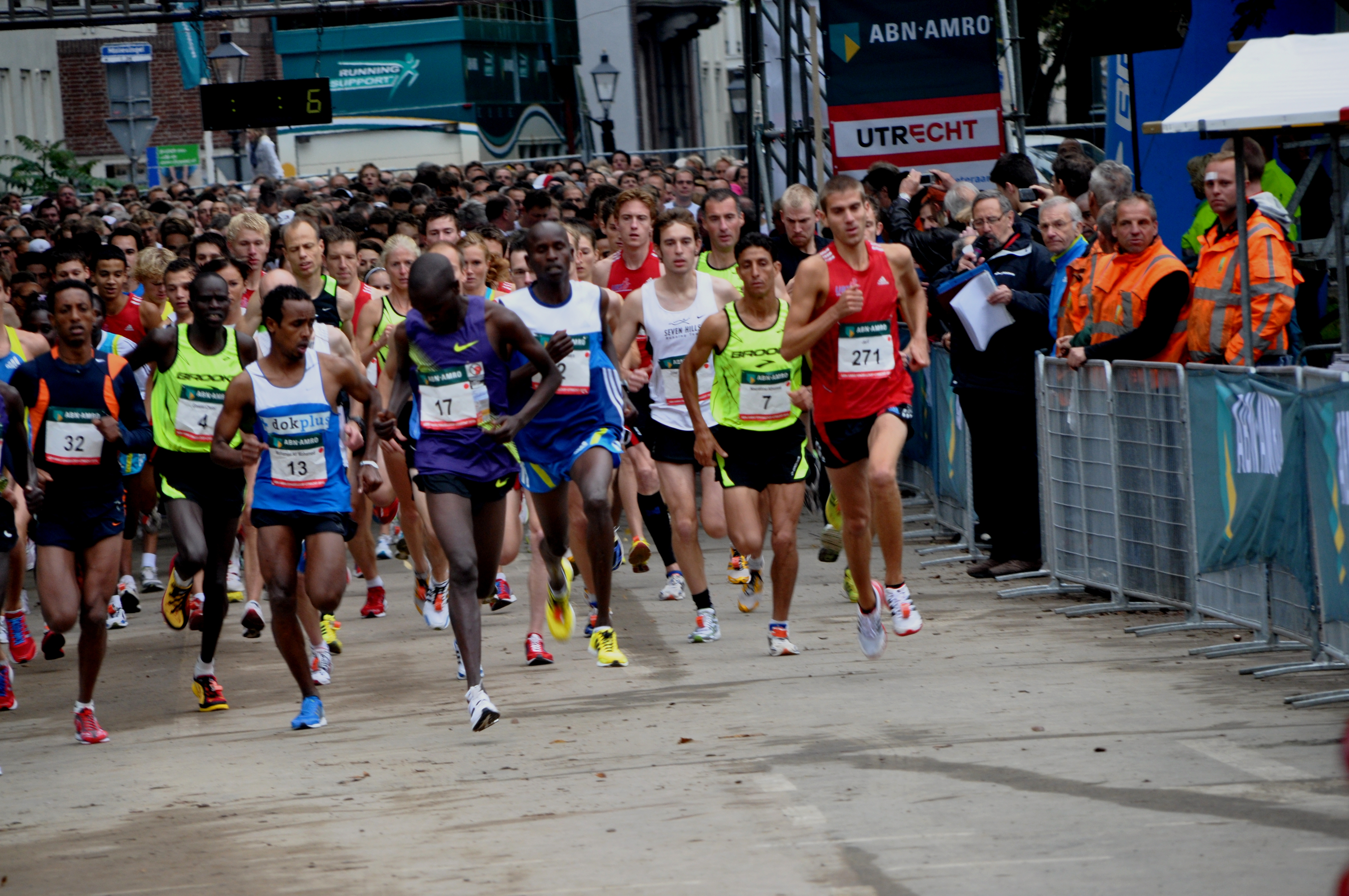
Action from the start of the 2010 elite men's race

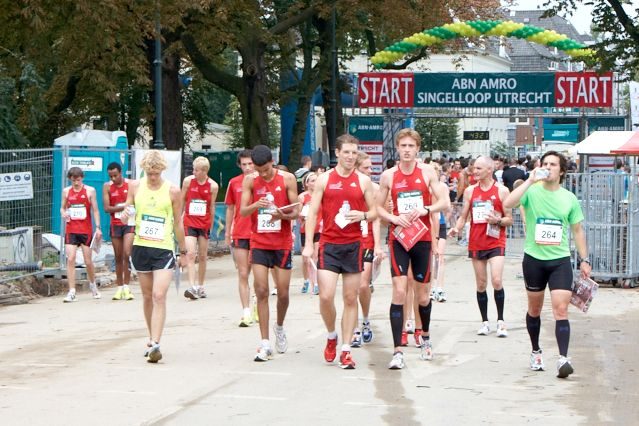
Runners near the starting line at the 2010 edition

Key: Course record

Edition	Year	Men's winner	Time (h:m:s)	Women's winner	Time (h:m:s)
Winners list incomplete from 1925 to 1998
55th	1999	Marc Vanderstraeten (BEL)	46:39	Liesbeth Van De Heuvel (NED)	58:54
56th	2000	Mohamed Baket (PLE)	45:55	Ineke Meijer (NED)	58:28
Not held from 2001 to 2006
57th	2007	Mark Tanui (KEN)	27:52	Lornah Kiplagat (NED)	32:05
58th	2008	Sammy Kitwara (KEN)	27:44	Monica Chepkoech (KEN)	32:01
59th	2009	Leonard Komon (KEN)	27:10	Nadia Ejjafini (ITA)	32:37
60th	2010	Leonard Komon (KEN)	26:44 WR	Rkia el Moukim (MAR)	32:51
61st	2011	Philip Langat (KEN)	27:28	Winnie Jepkemoi (KEN)	31:31
62nd	2012	Charles Cheruiyot (KEN)	28:22	Miranda Boonstra (NED)	34:05
63rd	2013	Timothy Kiptoo (KEN)	28:25	Joyce Chepkirui (KEN)	31:20
64th	2014	David Kogei (KEN)	28:46	Lucy Macharia (KEN)	32:26
65th	2015	Abraham Cheroben (KEN)	27:35	Yasmin Hillebrink (NED)	34:36
66th	2016	Bashir Abdi (BEL)	28:31	Elizeba Cherono (NED)	32:07
67th	2017	Benard Kimeli (KEN)	27:57	Genet Beyene (ETH)	33:29
68th	2018	Davis Kiplagat (KEN)	27:24	Eva Cherono (KEN)	31:17
69th	2019	Abraham Cheroben (BHR)	28:17	Eva Cherono (KEN)	30:51
