= Kiprotich =

Kiprotich is a Kalenjin name, common in parts of Kenya and Uganda inhabited by the Kalenjin people. It stems from the term "Rot Tich" which means cattle moving in from pasture between 5 PM and 6 PM. The prefix Kip-, means that the bearer is a male and was born while cattle where moving in from pasture. It is closely related to Kiprono. Its feminine counterpart is Cherotich.

== Notable people ==
=== Athletes ===
- Collins Cheboi Kiprotich (born 1987), Kenyan middle-distance runner
- Filex Kiprotich (born 1988), Kenyan long-distance runner
- John Kiprotich, winner of 2011 Vienna City Marathon
- Nixon Kiprotich, (born 1962) Kenyan 800 metres runner
- Peter Kiprotich (1979–2011), Kenyan long-distance runner
- Stephen Kiprotich (born 1989), Ugandan long-distance runner and 2012 Olympic marathon champion
- Wesley Kiprotich (born 1979), Kenyan middle-distance runner who specialises in the steeplechase
- Wilson Kipsang Kiprotich (born 1982), Kenyan long-distance runner
- David Kiprotich Bett (born 1992), Kenyan long-distance runner, who specialises in the 5000 meters
- John Kiprotich Chemisto, Kenyan marathon runner (see 2005 Saint Silvester Road Race)
- Kenai Kiprotich Kenei (born 1978), Kenyan long-distance runner
- Mark Kiprotich Mutai (born 1978), Kenyan runner, who specializes in 400 metres
- Matthew Kiprotich Birir (born 1972), former athlete from Kenya, winner of 3000 m steeplechase
- Wilson Kiprotich Kebenei (born 1980), Kenyan long-distance runner
- Collins Kiprotich Maiyo (born 2003), Kenyan nurse
