= Jepchumba =

Quenian digital artist and art curator

- Born: Kenya
- Citizenship: Kenyan
- Education: London Metropolitan University
- Occupations: Digital artist; Curator; Cultural ambassador; Activist
- Organizations: African Digital Art; Future Lab Africa
- Known for: Founder of African Digital Art; promotion of digital art in Africa
- Notable work: African Digital Art; Future Lab Africa (podcast)
- Awards: Forbes "20 Most Powerful Young Women in Africa" (2012); The Guardian "25 Most Entrepreneurial Women in Africa" (2013); The Guardian "10 Pioneering Names in Tech in Africa" (2015)

Jepchumba is a Kenyan digital artist, cultural ambassador, curator and activist. She was the creator of the digital art dissemination platform African Digital Art, and has been recognized by the American magazine Forbes as one of the "20 most powerful young women in Africa" and named by the British newspaper The Guardian as one of the 25 most relevant female entrepreneurs on the African continent.

== Biography ==
Jepchumba's father was a diplomat, so from an early age she lived in several countries, including Kenya, South Africa, the United States and the United Kingdom, which served as inspiration for her work.

Jepchumba graduated with a degree in Critical Social Thinking, and later completed a Masters in Digital Media at the London Metropolitan University. Jepchumba is an expert in communication and digital art, where she experiments with movement, sound, digital effects and other techniques and has dedicated her career to promoting technological development in Africa enhancing the continent's talent and creativity.

In 2008, she created the digital art dissemination platform African Digital Art, which showcases creative digital practices from the African continent, including graphic arts, animation, websites, films and design projects. She was also the creator of the podcast Future Lab Africa, which seeks to foster the listener's imagination and creativity through a tour of the science and technology of the African continent existing outside of laboratories and spaces specific to innovation.

In 2012, she gave a TED Talk at TEDxEuston. In 2015, Jepchumba was the curator for the Digital and Communications sectors at Design Indaba Expo, one of the largest design events in the world. In 2019, she presented her work at the N'GOLÁ Biennial of Art and Culture in São Tomé and Príncipe. In 2020, she was responsible for developing and curating the online space for the Nyege Nyege Festival showcasing the latest African art and music trends.

In 2020, Jepchumba received a grant from the international collective Creative Disturbance, which promotes collaboration between artistic, scientific, and technological communities.

== Recognitions ==
In 2012, Jepchumba was named one of the "20 Most Powerful Young Women in Africa" by Forbes magazine. he following year, The Guardian recognized her as one of the "25 Most Entrepreneurial Women in Africa". The same newspaper included Jepchumba in 2015 as one of the "10 Pioneering Names in Tech in Africa".
