= Varser =

Village in Gegharkunik, Armenia

Varser Վարսեր
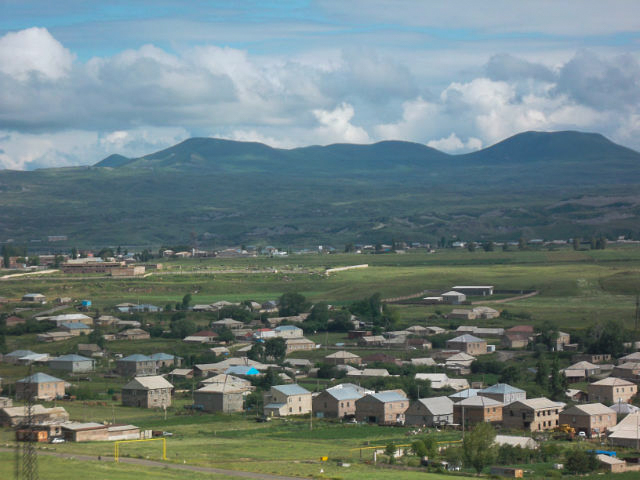
- A view of Varser

- Location within Armenia Location within Gegharkunik
- Coordinates: 40°33′16″N 44°54′29″E
- Country: Armenia
- Province: Gegharkunik
- Municipality: Sevan
- Elevation: 1,917 m (6,289 ft)

Population (2011)
  - Total: 1,901
- Time zone: UTC+4 (AMT)
- Postal code: 1515

Varser (Armenian: Վարսեր) is a village in the Sevan Municipality of the Gegharkunik Province of Armenia.

== Etymology ==
The name Varser is derived from a root word meaning "hair". According to popular folklore, this refers to a girl who drowned in Lake Sevan, after which her long hair spread out across the water. The village was also previously known as Chirchir and Chrchr until 1946.

== History ==
The village is first mentioned in the 9th century as a gift of Ashot II Bagratuni to an "Apostles' Church". Most of the Armenians in the village are descendants of migrants from Bitlis and Maku in Western Armenia, today located in southeastern Turkey and northwestern Iran, respectively.

== Gallery ==
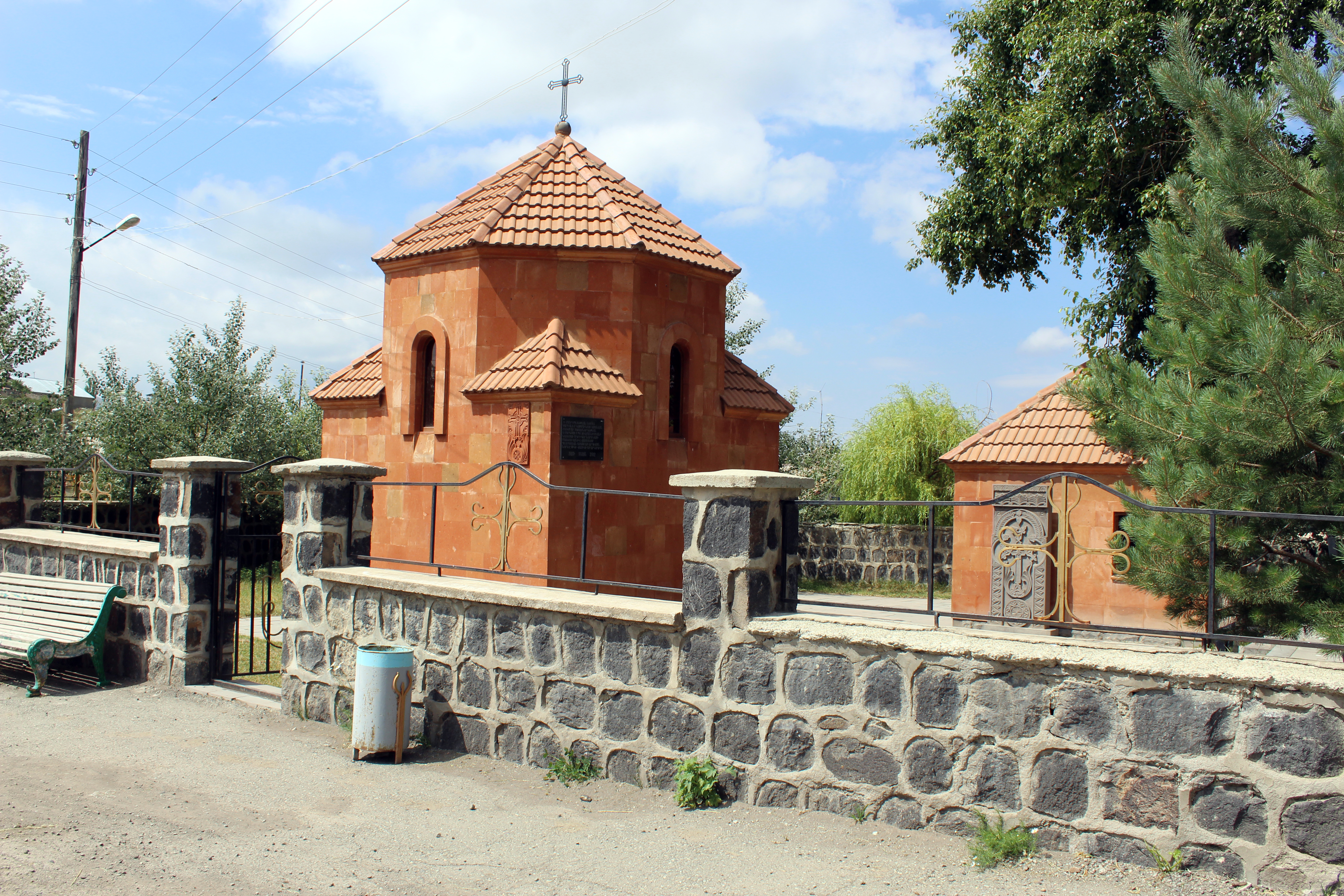
Church in Varser

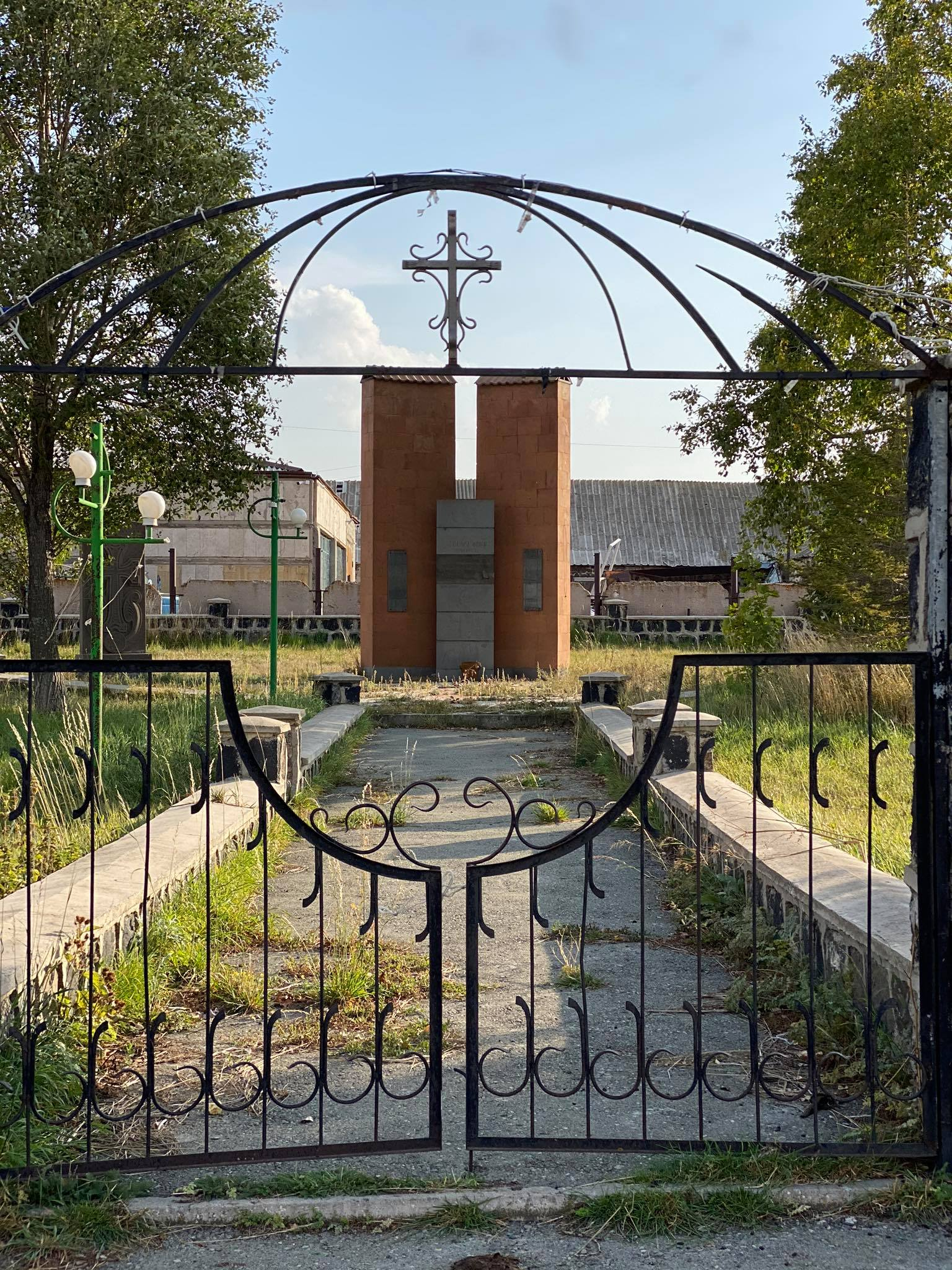
WWII monument

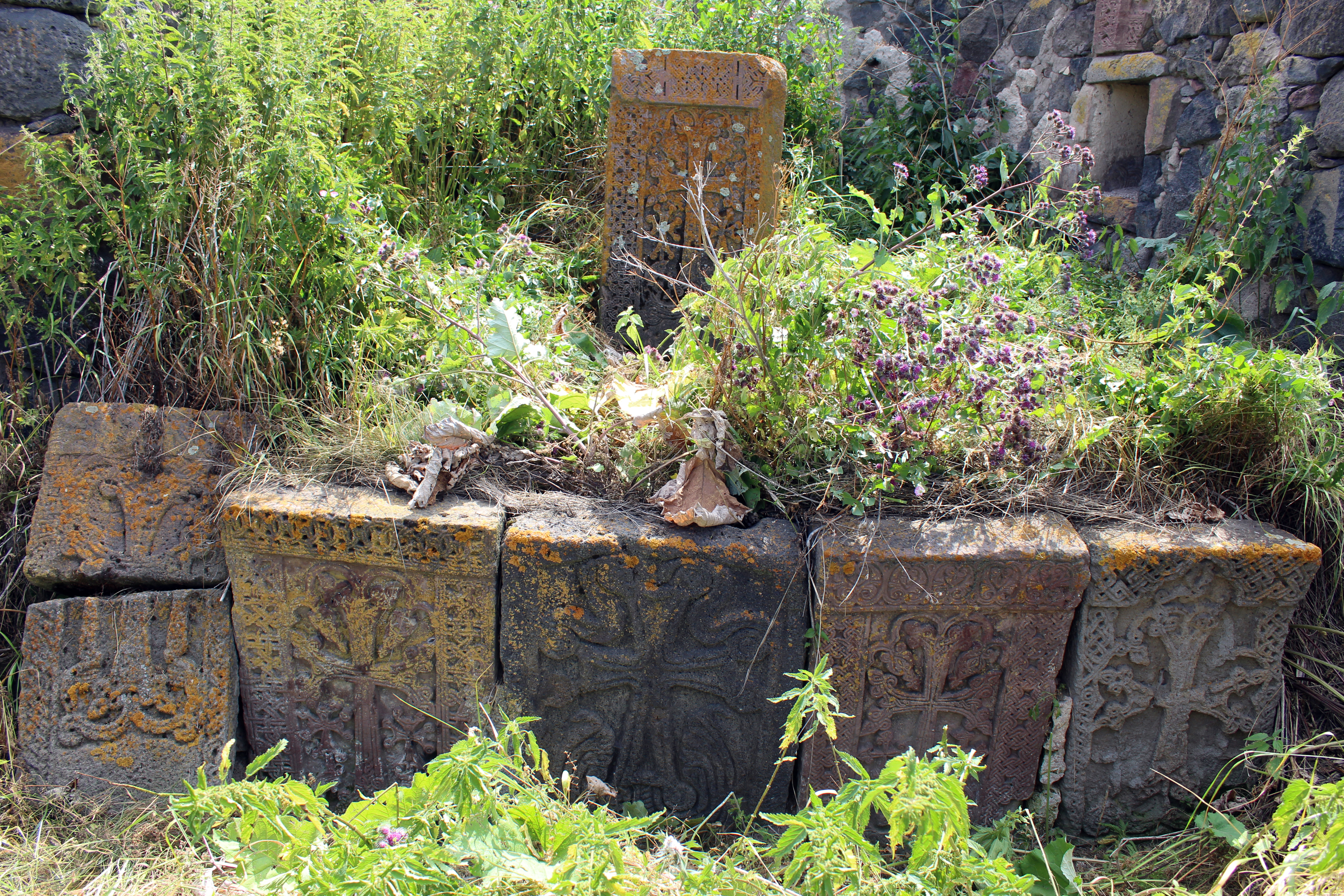
Khachkars in Varser

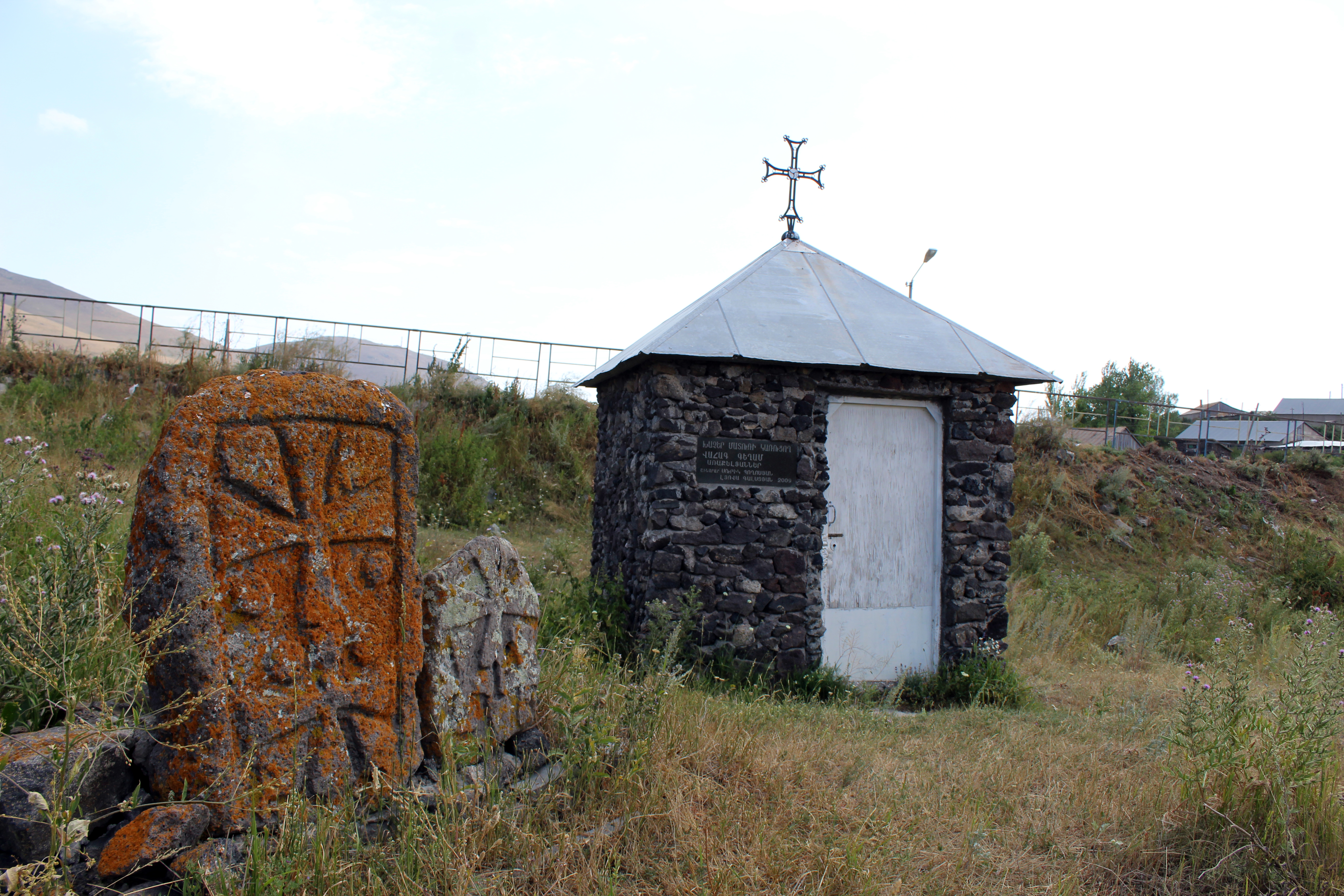
Chapel near the village cemetery

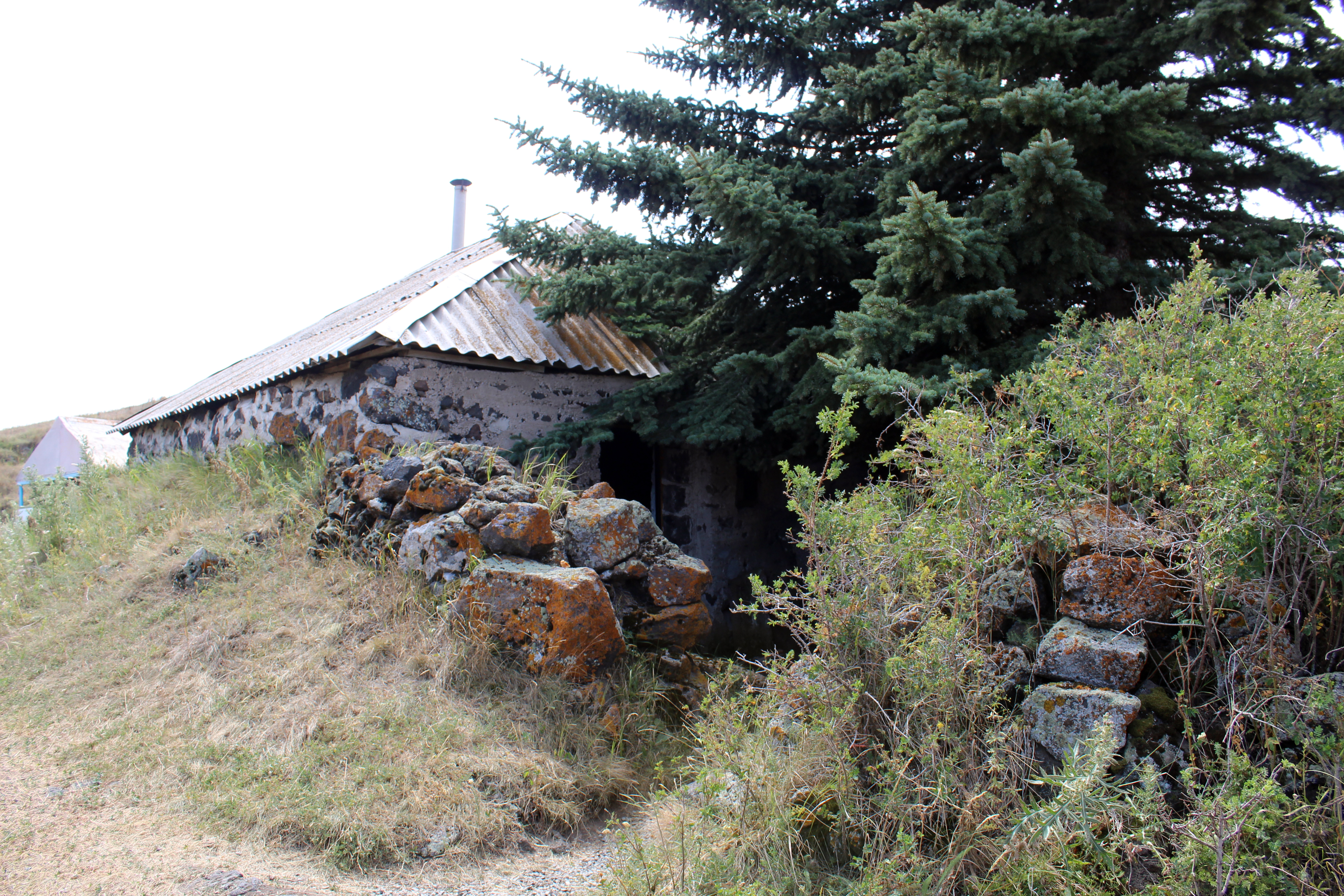
Tsaghkavank

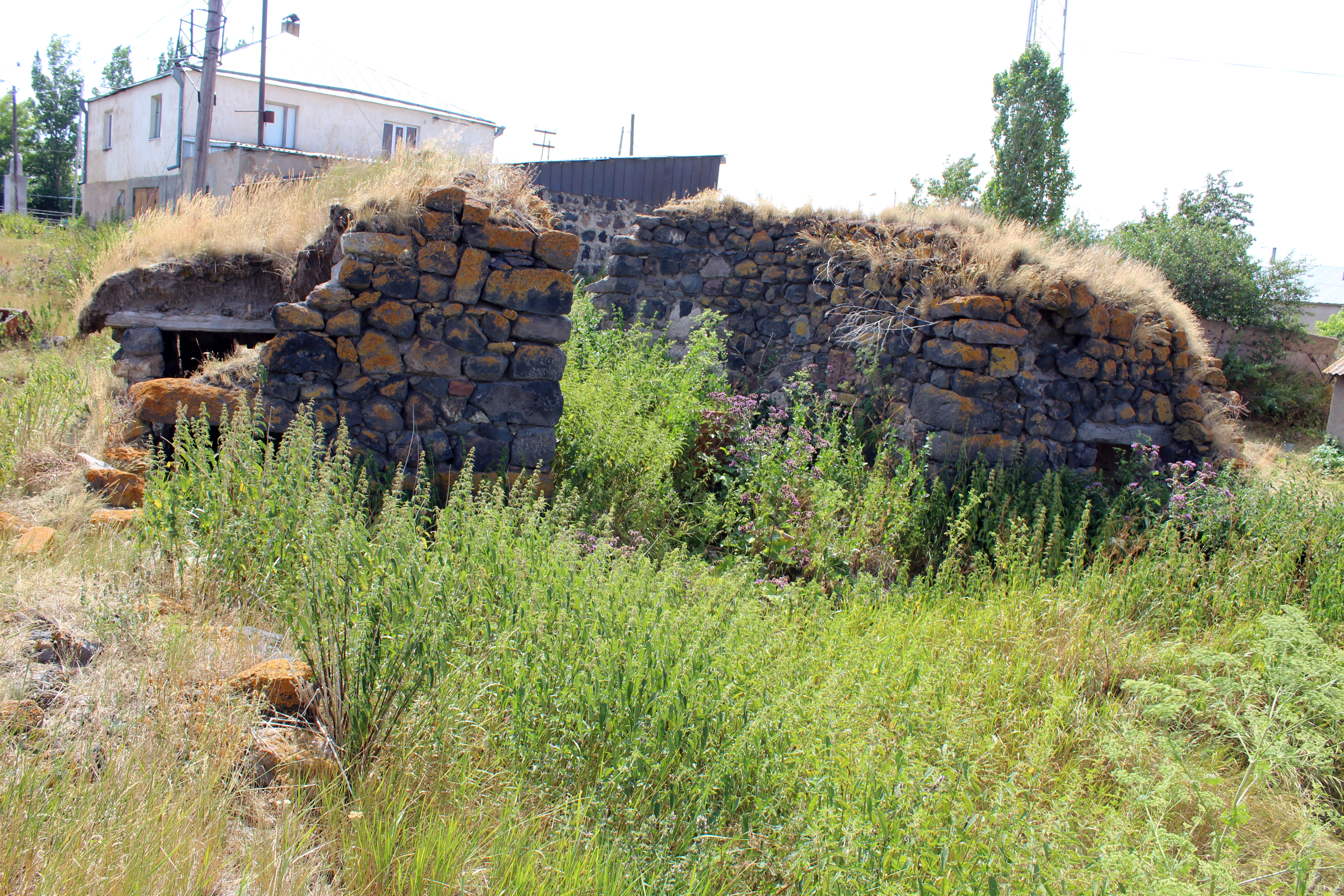
Church ruins

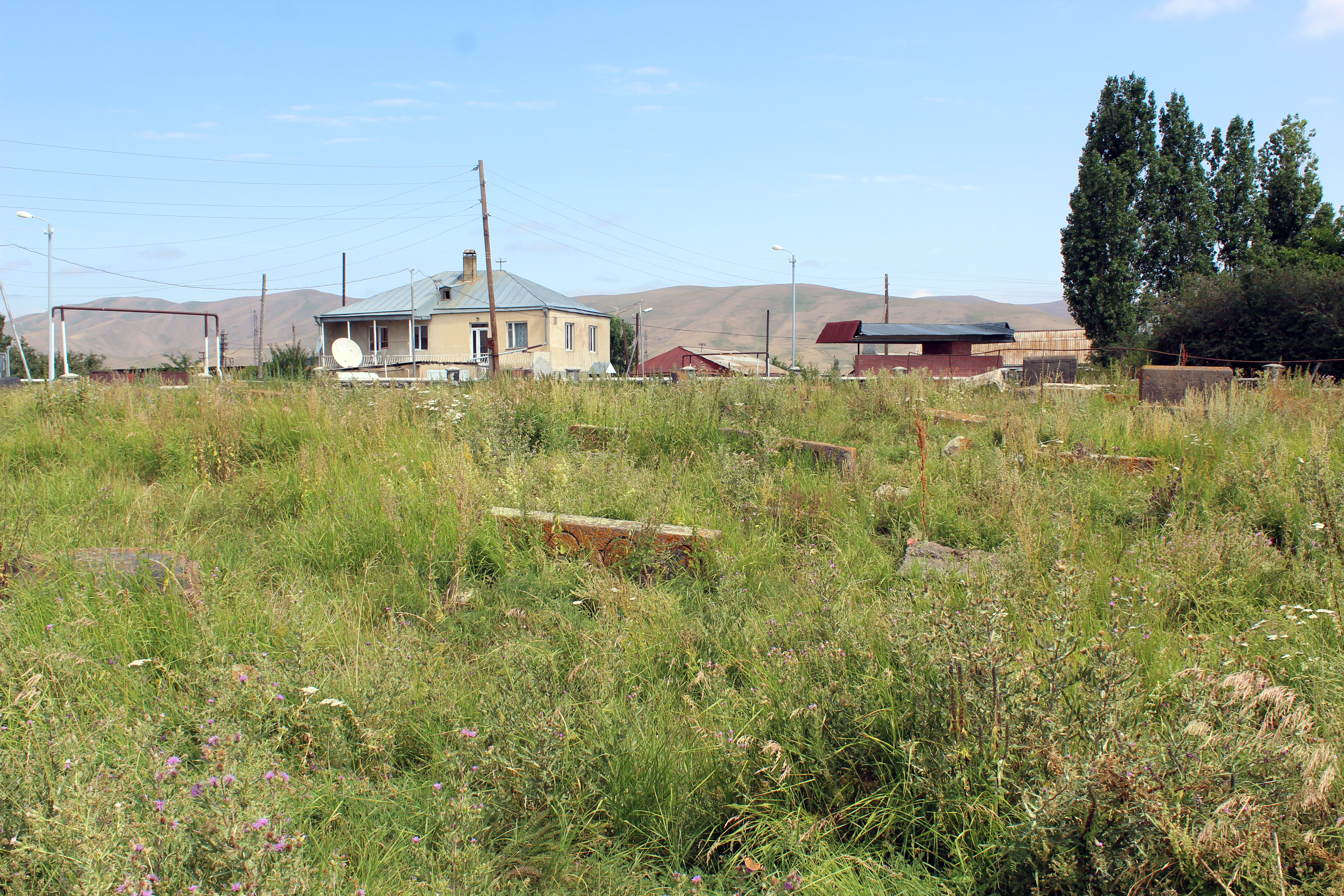
Varser cemetery
