= Kipchumba =

Kipchumba is a patronymic of Kenyan / Kalenjin people origin meaning "son of Chumba", or born in the hospital (in the presence of White people). It may refer to:

- Benson Kipchumba Barus (born 1980), Kenyan road runner and winner of the 2011 Prague Marathon
- Benson Kipchumba Cherono (born 1984), Kenyan marathon runner and 2005 Beijing Marathon winner
- Boaz Kipchumba Kaino, Kenyan politician and Member of the National Assembly for the Orange Democratic Movement
- Irene Kwambai Kipchumba (born 1978), Kenyan long-distance runner
- Jafred Chirchir Kipchumba (born 1983), Kenyan marathon runner and 2011 Eindhoven Marathon winner
- Paul Kipchumba Lonyangata (born 1992), Kenyan marathon runner
- Peter Kipchumba Rono (born 1967), Kenyan middle-distance runner and 1988 Olympic champion
- Robert Kipkorir Kipchumba (born 1984), Kenyan road runner and 2006 World Half Marathon runner-up
- Ronald Kipchumba Rutto (born 1987), Kenyan steeplechase and marathon runner
- Titus Kipchumba Mbishei (born 1990), Kenyan long-distance runner
- Vincent Kipchumba, Kenyan long-distance runner
- Wilson Kipchumba Kirwa (born 1974), Kenyan middle-distance runner competing for Finland
