= Barmani Choge =

Nigerian Hausa singer (1945–2013)

- Born: Hajiya Sa'adatu Ahmad; 1945; Katsina State, Nigeria
- Died: March 2, 2013 (aged 67–68) Funtua
- Genres: Hausa singer
- Occupation: singer

Hajiya Sa'adatu Ahmad, known as Barmani Choge (1945–2013) was a Hausa singer.

== Life ==
Hajiya Sa'adatu Ahmad was born in 1945 in the village of Gwaigwayi, in Katsina State in northern Nigeria. Born into a household of Islamic scholars, she received Islamic education from her father. She also took part in dandali, open-air playing and singing with other children. At the age of fifteen she married Alhaji Aliya, a local young businessman, with whom she had twelve children. Her husband had himself sung and played the garaya lute with his father, and encouraged her singing. In 1973 she started performing at marriage and naming ceremonies. She gained "a reputation as a boisterous and uninhibited performer who 'said it like it was', since she addressed issues intimate to women, about life, wealth, husbands and survival."

Alhaji Aliyu died in 1991. Hajiya Sa’adatu remarried in 1995 to Alhaji Bello Kansila, but the marriage only lasted a year. For the rest of her life she concentrated on her performance and looking after her children. Her last public performance was in Kaduna on 15 December 2012. She fell ill soon after, and died, aged 68, in Funtuwa on 2 March 2013.
