= Eindhoven Marathon =

Annual marathon race

- Date: Second Sunday of October
- Location: Eindhoven, Netherlands
- Event type: Road
- Distance: Marathon (42.195 km)
- Primary sponsor: ASML
- Established: 1959
- Course records: Men's: 2:04:51 (2023) (Kenya) Kenneth Kipkemoi; Women's: 2:22:47 (2022) (Kenya) Paskalia Chepkogei
- Website: Eindhoven Marathon
- Participants: 4,358 finishers (2025); 1,527 (2021); 2,423 (2019)

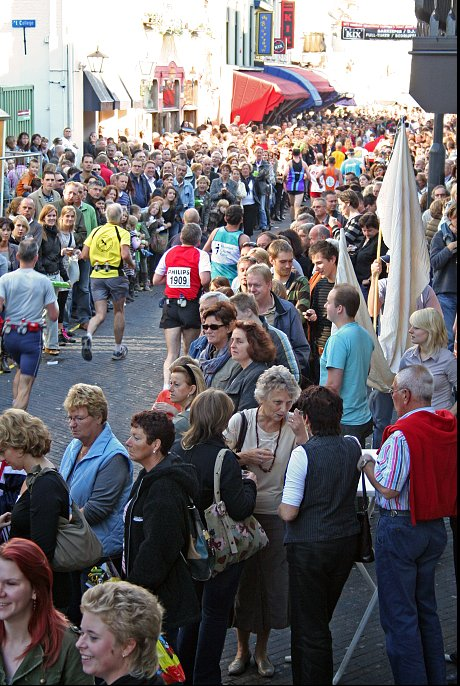
Crowds gather around runners at the 2007 Eindhoven Marathon

The Eindhoven Marathon (Dutch: Marathon Eindhoven) is an annual marathon race over the classic distance of 42.195km which is held in the city of Eindhoven, The Netherlands in October. It has been an annual race since 1990 – it was held biennially over the eight years before this date.

Kenneth Kipkemoi and Paskalia Chepkogei are the men's and women's course record holders with times of 2:04:51 and 2:22:47 hours, respectively.

Around 30,000 people participate in one of the runs or walks at the ASML Marathon Eindhoven, which includes runs like the marathon and the half marathon. The weekend event is usually attended by around 200,000 people.

== Past winners ==
Key: Course record Dutch championship race

Edition	Year	Men's winner	Time	Women's winner	Time
41st	October 12, 2025	Kenneth Kipkemoi (KEN)	2:06:33	Flomena Chepkiach (KEN)	2:25:41
40th	October 13, 2024	Enock Kinyamal (KEN)	02:06:27	Vivian Jerotich (KEN)	02:26:41
39th	October 08, 2023	Kenneth Kipkemoi (KEN)	2:04:52	Chloe Herbiet (BEL)	2:27:54
38th	October 09, 2022	Pius Karanja (KEN)	2:06:55	Paskalia Chepkogei (KEN)	2:22:47
37th	October 10, 2021	Silas Too (KEN)	2:06:32	Bregje Smits (NED)	2:48:08
—	2020	Canceled due to the COVID-19 pandemic			
36th	October 13, 2019	Laban Mutai (KEN)	2:06:40	Betty Chepleting (KEN)	2:28:43
35th	October 14, 2018	Elisha Kipchirchir (KEN)	2:07:32	Nina Lauwaert (BEL)	2:30:24
34th	October 8, 2017	Festus Talam (KEN)	2:06:13	Eunice Jeptoo (KEN)	2:26:13
33nd	October 9, 2016	Festus Talam (KEN)	2:06:26	Truphena Chepchirchir (KEN)	2:30:32
32nd	October 11, 2015	Stephen Chebogut (KEN)	2:05:52	Els Rens (BEL)	2:38:16
31st	October 12, 2014	Tilahun Regassa (ETH)	2:06:21	Iwona Lewandowska (POL)	2:28:33
30th	October 13, 2013	Yemane Tsegay (ETH)	2:09:11	Ruth Wanjiru (KEN)	2:34:48
29th	October 14, 2012	Dickson Chumba (KEN)	2:05:46	Aberume Mekuria (ETH)	2:27:20
28th	October 9, 2011	Jafred Kipchumba (KEN)	2:05:48	Georgina Rono (KEN)	2:24:33
27th	October 10, 2010	Charles Kamathi (KEN)	2:07:38	Atsede Habtamu (ETH)	2:25:35
26th	October 11, 2009	Geoffrey Mutai (KEN)	2:07:01	Beata Naigambo (NAM)	2:31:01
25th	October 12, 2008	Geoffrey Mutai (KEN)	2:07:49	Lydia Kurgat (KEN)	2:33:39
24th	October 14, 2007	Philip Singoei (KEN)	2:07:57	Lydia Kurgat (KEN)	2:39:21
23rd	October 8, 2006	Philip Singoei (KEN)	2:08:18	Agnes Hijman (NED)	2:54:36
22nd	October 9, 2005	Boniface Usisivu (KEN)	2:08:45	Tatyana Perepelkina (RUS)	2:38:27
21st	October 10, 2004	Willy Cheruiyot (KEN)	2:09:20	Annelieke van der Sluijs (NED)	2:37:33
20th	October 12, 2003	Willy Cheruiyot (KEN)	2:09:05	Vivian Ruijters (NED)	2:36:36
19th	October 13, 2002	Willy Cheruiyot (KEN)	2:10:12	Marleen van Reusel (BEL)	2:54:23
18th	October 14, 2001	Samuel Tangus (KEN)	2:12:47	Valentina Poltavskaya (UKR)	2:54:30
17th	October 8, 2000	Willy Cheruiyot (KEN)	2:09:55	Wilma van Onna (NED)	2:39:55
16th	October 10, 1999	David Ngetich (KEN)	2:09:24	Nadezhda Wijenberg (NED)	2:28:45
15th	October 11, 1998	Grzegorz Gajdus (POL)	2:10:51	Simona Staicu (ROM)	2:36:05
14th	October 12, 1997	John Kiprono (KEN)	2:11:51	Mieke Hombergen (NED)	2:36:14
13th	October 13, 1996	Tumo Turbo (ETH)	2:11:26	Simona Staicu (ROM)	2:37:47
12th	October 8, 1995	Petro Sarafyniuk (UKR)	2:16:40	Carla Beurskens (NED)	2:35:16
11th	October 9, 1994	Aiduna Aitnafa (ETH)	2:11:37	Jeanne Jansen (NED)	2:45:03
10th	October 10, 1993	Mohamed Selmi (ALG)	2:12:47	Liesbeth van Ast (NED)	2:40:57
9th	October 11, 1992	Andy Green (GBR)	2:15:09	Adriana Andrescu (ROM)	2:37:18
8th	October 13, 1991	Vladimir Kotov (BLR)	2:14:03	Mieke Hombergen (NED)	2:46:28
7th	October 14, 1990	John Vermeule (NED)	2:15:03	Mieke Hombergen (NED)	2:44:59
6th	October 16, 1988	Jean-Pierre Paumen (BEL)	2:14:54	Heather MacDuff (GBR)	2:34:26
5th	October 12, 1986	Kim Reynierse (NED)	2:15:13	Heather MacDuff (GBR)	2:55:39
4th	September 23, 1984	Harrie Driessen (NED)	2:22:17	Annelies van Dijk (NED)	3:12:13
3rd	October 24, 1982	Lucien Rottiers (BEL)	2:16:27	Ann Rindt (NED)	2:59:07
—	1961–1981	Marathon Race Not Held			
2nd	July 23, 1960	Frans Künen (NED)	2:26:07 NR	—	—
1st	July 4, 1959	Fritz Schöning (FRG)	2:45:05	—	—
