= Jepchirchir =

Jepchirchir (also spelled Chepchirchir) is a name of Kalenjin origin. It indicates that the bearer meaning a girl or woman who was born "after a short labour" ("Chirchir"). The masculine equivalent of this name is Kipchirchir.

== People ==
=== Athletes ===
- Bilha Chepchirchir (born 1990), Kenyan international volleyball player
- Caroline Jepchirchir Chepkwony (born 1985), Kenyan road runner
- Cynthia Chepchirchir Kosgei (born 1993), Kenyan road runner and winner of the Berlin Half Marathon
- Dorcas Jepchirchir Kiptarus (born 1990), Kenyan runner at the 2008 World Cross Country Championships
- Flomena Chepchirchir (born 1981), Kenyan marathon runner
- Joyce Jepchirchir Chebii (born 1978), Kenyan sports shooter at the 2014 Commonwealth Games
- Justina Chepchirchir (born 1968), Kenyan middle-distance runner and four-time African Champion
- Peres Jepchirchir (born 1993), Kenyan runner, half marathon world champion and Olympic marathon champion
- Sarah Chepchirchir (born 1984), Kenyan half marathon runner
- Zipporah Jepchirchir Kittony, Kenyan politician elected to the Senate of Kenya in 2013
