= Lagat =

Lagat is a surname. Notable people with the surname include:

- Bernard Lagat (born 1974), Kenyan-American middle- and long-distance runner
- Cleophas Lagat, Kenyan politician and Governor of Nandi County
- Elijah Lagat (1966–2025), Kenyan marathon runner and politician
- Viola Cheptoo Lagat (born 1989), Kenyan middle-distance runner

== See also ==
- Langat (surname), a related Kalenjin surname
