= Jackson Kiptanui =

Kenyan politician

Jackson Kiplagat Kiptanui is a Kenyan politician. He belongs to the United Republican Party and was elected to represent the Keiyo South Constituency in the National Assembly of Kenya since the 2007 Kenyan parliamentary election. He currently chairs the Board of Directors of Kerio Valley Development Authority- KVDA.
