= Kiprono =

Kiprono is a masculine given name of Kalenjin origin. The name indicates that the bearer was born near dusk as sheep and goats returned from grazing ("rot nego"), usually around 5 to 6 p.m. It is related to the name "Kiprotich." The feminine equivalent is Jerono or Cherono .

== Notable people ==
=== Politicians ===
- Henry Kiprono Kosgey, Kenyan politician for Orange Democratic Movement
- Isaac Ruto, Kenyan politician for the United Republican Party
- Kipkalya Kiprono Kones (1952–2008), Kenyan politician for the Orange Democratic Movement and former government minister
- Kiprono Langat, Kenyan politician for the Orange Democratic Movement
- Kipyator Nicholas Kiprono arap Biwott (born 1940), Kenyan businessman and politician
- Moses Kiprono arap Keino (1937–1998), Kenyan politician and Speaker of the Parliament of Kenya

=== Journalists ===
- Demas Kiprono, Kenyan journalist and lawyer
- Justus Kiprono, Young Kenyan journalist and writer

=== Runners ===
- Augustine Kiprono Choge (born 1987), Kenyan long-distance track runner and 2006 Commonwealth Games champion
- Elijah Kiprono Kemboi (born 1984), Kenyan marathon runner and 2011 Košice Marathon winner
- Emmanuel Kiprono Kipsang (born 1991), Kenyan long-distance track runner
- Geoffrey Kiprono Mutai (born 1981), Kenyan marathon runner and former Boston Marathon and New York Marathon champion
- Gladys Cherono Kiprono (born 1983), Kenyan long-distance track runner and two-time African champion
- Henry Kiprono Kirwa, Kenyan Paralympic runner and three-time Paralympic champion
- Isaac Kiprono Songok (born 1984), Kenyan cross country runner and two-time World Championships medallist
- Josephat Kiprono (born 1973), Kenyan marathon runner and winner of the 1999 Berlin Marathon
- Josphat Kiprono Menjo (born 1979), Kenyan long-distance track and road runner
- Noah Kiprono Ngeny (born 1978), Kenyan 1500 metres runner and 2000 Olympic champion
- Philip Kiprono Langat (born 1990), Kenyan long-distance road runner
- Robert Kiprono Cheruiyot (born 1988), Kenyan marathon runner and winner of the 2010 Boston Marathon

=== Scientists ===
- Richard Kiprono Mibey, Kenyan biologist, mycologist and university administrator

== See also ==
- Rono (disambiguation)
- Kip Rono (born 1958), Kenyan steeplechase runner
