= Philip Langat =

Kenyan long-distance runner (born 1990)

Philip Kiprono Langat (born 1990) is a Kenyan long-distance runner who specialises in road running events. He won the 2011 Montferland Run. He has a half marathon best of 1:01:05 and a 10K best of 27:28 minutes.

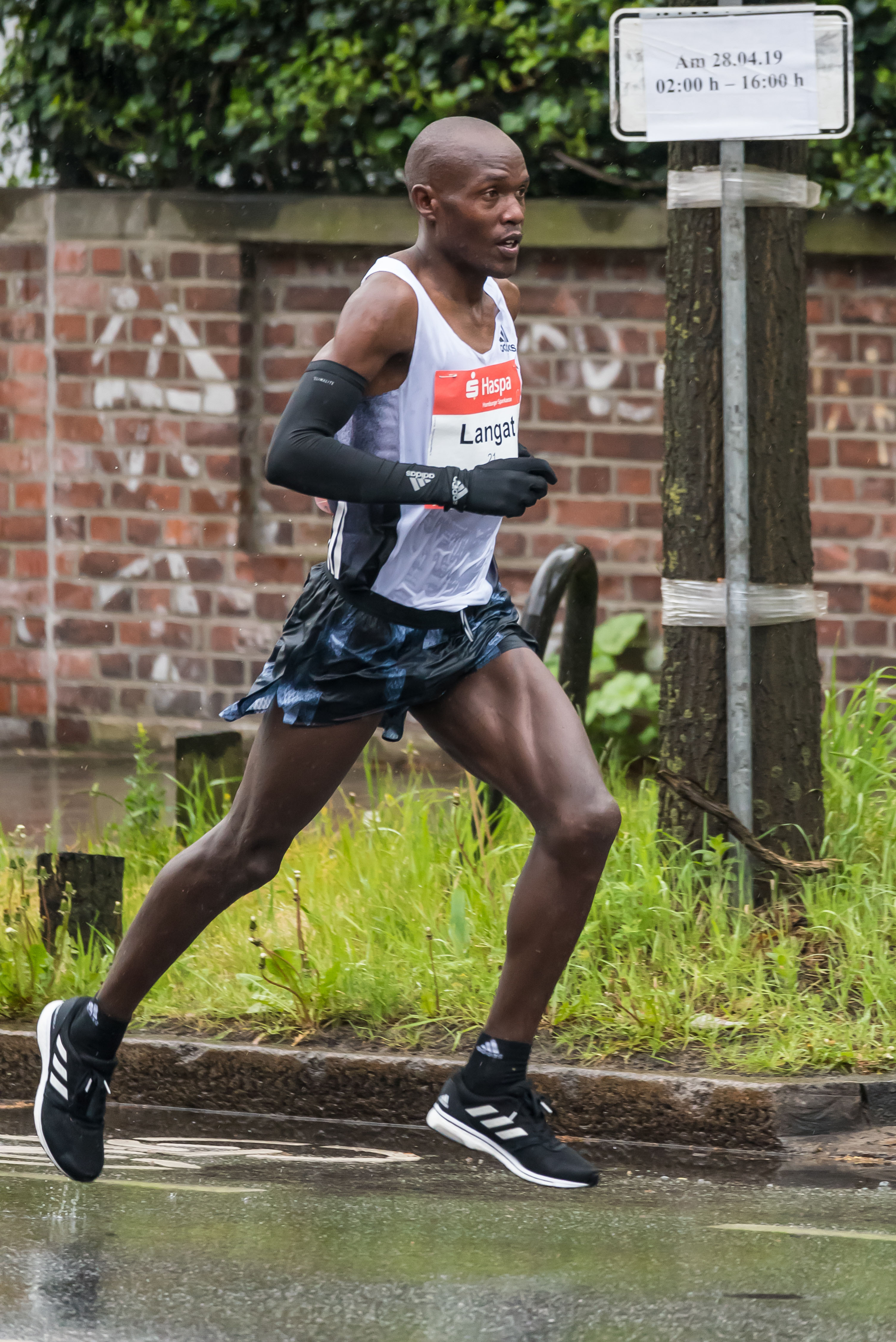
Hamburg Marathon on 28 April 2019

After competing on the Kenyan junior cross country circuit to little success, Langat made his breakthrough in 2010 by winning the Administration Police National Cross Country Championships, having entered as a member of the public. He performed poorly at the Kenyan World Championship trial race (placing 60th) and instead competed on the Italian road running circuit that year. He was runner-up at the Turin and Cremona Half Marathons, setting a best of 62:52 minutes at the latter race. He also came third at the Giro Podistico di Rovereto and fourth at the Giro al Sas races.

Langat ran in a series of Dutch races in the 2011 season, starting with a second-place finish at the Venloop half marathon. He was fourth at the Parelloop then won the Oelder Sparkassen Citylauf and Zwitserloot Dak Run 10K races. A half marathon best followed at the Zwolle Half Marathon, where he was fifth with a time of 61:56 minutes. He won the Singelloop Utrecht 10K in September then won the Singelloop Breda half marathon the following month. He won his fifth Dutch race of the year at the Montferland Run 15K, where he beat high level competition including Hailu Mekonnen and Abel Kirui. He was runner-up to Geoffrey Mutai at the B.A.A. 10K in June 2012. He spent the rest of the year on the Dutch where he won the Stadsloop Appingedam and Breda Half Marathon, as well as runner-up at the Utrecht Singelloop and Monterferland Run.
