= Loikop people =

Former tribal confederacy in East Africa

Loikop
- (Nilotic, Maa-speaking) Nilotic, Maa-speaking (including those of ancestral descent)

Regions with significant populations
- Kenya, Tanzania

Languages
- Maa language

Religion
- Traditional beliefs

Related ethnic groups
- Maasai people, Samburu people, Kwavi people, Parakuyo people, Laikipiak people
- The Loikop people were a tribal confederacy that fragmented into several modern-day ethnic groups, including the Maasai, Samburu, and Kwavi.

The Loikop people, also known as Wakuafi, Kor, Mu-Oko, Muoko/Ma-Uoko and Mwoko, were a tribal confederacy who inhabited present-day Kenya in the regions north and west of Mount Kenya and east and south of Lake Turkana. The area is roughly conterminous with Samburu and Laikipia Counties and portions of Baringo, Turkana and (possibly) Meru Counties. The group spoke a common tongue related to the Maasai language, and typically herded cattle. The Loikop occasionally interacted with the Cushitic, Bantu, and Chok peoples. The confederacy had dispersed by the 21st century.

== Etymology ==
Johann Ludwig Krapf of the Church Missionary Society in East Africa arrived on the East African coast in December 1843. Krapf made his first trip into the interior the following month and encountered reports of the nearby Okooafee and their southern neighbors, the Quapee. He deduced that the two groups were the same people within a year, and began referring to them as Wakuafi in his writings. In 1852, Krapf learned that the Wakuafi called themselves the Iloikop. He published a vocabulary of the Engutuk Eloikob in 1854, speculating that Iloikop was an abbreviation of the word engob (land or country) combined with the article loi and defining Iloikop as "those who are of/in the country, to whom it belongs")

Stigand (1913) noted that the term "Loikop" referred to "the people of the country of Laikipia" and that at the time it survived in the Rendille word "Lokkob". In Rendille the word Lokkob was used to "denote any cattle-breeding tribe, such as the Samburr or Masai, in distinction to a camel breeder". In another account, he notes;

...I might explain here what the word Lokkob means, as it has been assumed by former travelers that there is a tribe of that name. Lokkob is the Rendile corruption for Loikop. Thus it was the old Laikipia Masai, now no longer existing, who were originally called Lokkob by the Rendile.

— Chauncy Hugh Stigand, 1910

=== Associated terms ===
It has been suggested that the term Wakuafi was a Swahili term first used to represent all Iloikop peoples, and later narrowed to represent only the non-Maasai Iloikop. It is believed that the word Humba (or Lumbwa) was, likewise, a Bantu word used by the Bantu peoples of the interior to refer to Iloikop pastoralists.

Later writers noted other names used to refer to the same group of people. The Turkana, with whom the northern regions had significant interaction, referred to them as Kor. The present-day Samburu refer to themselves as Lokop (or Loikop), and the Turkana call the present-day Samburu Kor.

Meru tradition notes a people known as the Mu-Oko, Mwoko and Muoko/Ma-Uoko (paired variants found in one section). According to Imenti tradition, the Mwoko of that region were also known as Ikara (or Agira); in most other regions, the Ukara (in its variations) and the Muoko (in its variations) are seen as separate.

== Archaeological attestation ==
The ethnographic term/people group 'Loikop', closely parallels the Eastern Nilotic linguistic category. Taken in this context, the earliest archaeological attestation of this people group is the Turkwel tradition of western Turkana and north-eastern Uganda.

Ceramics characterized by decorative horizontal incisions in Jebel Kathangor in South Sudan have been tentatively linked to the Turkwel tradition. This has been dated to c.AD 450-1100 and explicitly linked to the spread of early Eastern Nilotic speakers, though this interpretation is treated with caution due to differences in the respective assemblages.

== History ==
=== Sources and historiography ===
The journals, letters and published articles of the first three missionaries of the Church Missionary Society in East Africa (Johann Ludwig Krapf, Johannes Rebmann and Jakob Erhardt), written during the 1840s and 1850s, are the earliest documented evidence of Loikop history. Although the writings of the first missionaries were consistent in their descriptions of the Loikop, they have been widely disregarded in favor of later written and oral sources. It has been suggested that the reason is the difference between their views of the Loikop and those of later writers, and views held by 20th-century Maasai after the linguistic, demographic and identity changes of the Maasai era.

Krapf arrived on the East African coast in December 1843, and made his first trip into the interior in January 1844. He encountered reports of the nearby "Okooafee" and their southern neighbors, the "Quapee". Krapf deduced within a year that the two groups were the same people, and he began referring to them as Wakuafi in his writings. In 1852, he learned that the Wakuafi referred to themselves as Iloikop. At this time, The Swahili name Wakuafi was used to describe all Iloikop peoples, although it was later narrowed to represent only the non-Maasai Iloikop.

Accounts by missionaries and explorers during the 1870s and 1880s generally agreed with those of early missionaries, with distinctions among the Maasai, Wakwavi and Lumbwa beginning to appear. In an early account, Thomas Wakefield described the "poor Wakwavi ... [who,] having long since been robbed of their cattle by the Maasai, were compelled to turn their attention to agricultural pursuits". Charles New concurred in 1873 with his predecessors' assertion that the Maasai and "Wakuavi" called themselves Orloikob, which he translated as "possessors of the soil"; both groups were pastoralists.

In his 1887 account, Through Maasai Land, Joseph Thompson made an observation which was a subtle but significant departure from previous accounts: "... However, we are including several isolated areas occupied either by tribes wholly different from the Masai, or by the agricultural Wa-kwafi, who are mere off-shoots of the Masai". This inverted the previous understanding of the Wakwavi-Maasai relationship. The inversion of the order laid out by Krapf, Rebmann and other explorers became the standard interpretation, possibly as the result of changes on the ground brought about by the Iloikop wars whose net result was the absorption of Iloikop identity by the Maasai.

== Origins ==
Nile records indicate that the three decades starting about 1800 were marked by low rainfall levels in regions south of the Sahara. East African oral narratives and the few written records indicate peak aridity during the 1830s resulting in recorded instances of famine in 1829 and 1835 in Ethiopia and 1836 in Kenya. Among Kenyan Rift Valley communities this arid period, and the consequent series of events, have been referred to as Mutai.

A feature of the Mutai was increased conflict between neighboring communities, most noted of these has been the Iloikop wars. Earlier conflicts preceding the wars appear to have brought about the pressures that resulted in this period of conflict. Von Höhnel (1894) and Lamphear (1988) recorded narratives concerning conflict between the Turkana and Burkineji or at least the section recalled as Sampur that appear to have been caused by even earlier demographic pressures.

=== Turkana - Burkineji conflict ===
Turkana narratives recorded by Lamphear (1988) provide a broad perspective of the prelude to the conflict between the Turkana and a community he refers to as Kor, a name by which the Turkana still call the Samburu in the present day.

By the end of the Palajam initiations, the developing Turkana community was experiencing strong ecological pressures. Behind them, up the escarpment in Karamoja, other evolvig Ateker societies such as the Karimojong and Dodos were occupying all available grazing lands. Therefore Turkana cattle camps began to push further down the Tarash, which ran northwards below the foothills of the Moru Assiger massif on their right and the escarpment on their left. As they advanced, the Turkana came to realize they were not alone in this new land. At night fires could be seen flickering on the slopes of nearby mountains, including Mt. Pelekee which loomed up in the distance directly before them...

— John Lamphear, 1988

Lamphear notes that Tukana traditions aver that a dreamer among them saw strange animals living with the people up in the hills. Turkana warriors were thus sent forward to capture one of these strange beasts, which the dreamer said looked 'like giraffes, but with humps on their backs'. The young men therefore went and captured one of these beasts - the first camels the Turkana had seen. The owners of the strange beasts appear to have struck the Turkana as strange as well. The Turkana saw them as 'red' people, partly because of their lighter skin and partly because they daubed their hair and bodies with reddish clay. They thus gave them the name 'Kor'. Lamphear states that Turkana traditions agree that the Kor were very numerous and lived in close pastoral association with two other communities known as 'Rantalle' and 'Poran', the names given to the Cushitic speaking Rendille and Boran communities.

According to Von Höhnel (1894) "a few decades" prior, the Burkineji occupied districts on the west of the lake and that they were later driven eastwards into present day Samburu. He later states that "some fifty years ago the Turkana owned part of the land on the west now occupied by the Karamoyo, whilst the southern portion of their land belonged to the Burkineji. The Karamoyo drove the Turkana further east, and the Turkana, in their turn, pushed the Burkineji towards Samburuland".

=== Fragmentation ===
According to Maasai traditions recorded by MacDonald (1899), the expansion of early Eloegop (Loikop) communities into a society occurred from a base east of Lake Turkana on three fronts.

Pushing southward from the country east of Lake Turkana the Loikop conquered a number of communities to occupy the plateaus adjacent to the Rift Valley. On the eastern escarpment, one front occupied the plateau now known as Laikipia and brought the Ogiek there under their patronage. Another front continued the southward expansion to the southern plateaus, as far as or even beyond Mount Kilimanjaro. The third front occupied the western escarpment, conquering the 'Senguer' people who dwelt on the plateau now known as Uasin Gishu and almost annihilated this community.

This expansion was followed by the development of three groupings within the Loikop society. The Sambur who occupied the 'original' country east of Lake Turkana as well as the Laikipia plateau. The Guash Ngishu occupied the grass plateaus of the Uasin Gishu and Mau while the Maasai territory extended from Naivasha to Kilimanjaro. The mythological rendition of this account as record by Straight et al. (2016) states that "three Maa clan clusters – Loiborkineji, Maasai, and Laikipiak – came out together...from the (baobab) Tree of Tangasa".

From these accounts, it is possible to surmise that the society once referred to as Loikop fragmented into the Samburu, Maasai and the Kwavi communities (the latter itself later fragmenting into the Laikipiak and Uasin Gishu communities). Indeed, this was stated explicitly by McDonald when he writes that the "..Masai, Kwafi (or more properly Guash Ngishu, for Kwafi, is a Swahili term) and Sambur (or Kore) are three divisions of one tribe, the Eloegop..."

== Territory ==
Stigand (1913) made notes concerning "the old Laikipia, the Loikop" people and their territory. He stated that "according to (his) informants, the country north of Gilgil and extending from this place to the Borana was in the old days called 'Laikipia', a name which is now confined to the plateau between the north of the Aberdres ranges and the Lorogai Mountains. The Masai inhabitants of this tract were called 'Loikop' or 'the people of the country of Laikipia'."

== Peoples ==
=== Samburu ===
According to traditions captured by MacDonald (1899), the Samburu were one of the three principal groupings that formed following fragmentation of the Loikop society. The Samburu historians interviewed by Straight et al. (2016) note that the Burkineji was one of the communities that arose from the separation. They do note that the 'Samburi Loiborkineji separated from the other Maa-speakers' in the wake of the 1830s mutai. This was just after the Lkipiku generation had been initiated. This separation is said to have occurred at a river;

...as for this name, Sampur, there was a time we went somewhere like a river and there was no food, only wild food. So...everyone has to make a bag - sampur, to carry anything edible....it was during a certain mutai when people made those bags

— Samburu historian, 2016

Samburu referring to a large, distinctive leather bag (sampur) which the Samburu carried: Lorere Lesampur ("people of the big bag").

=== Uasin Gishu ===
According to traditions captured by MacDonald (1899), the Uasin Gishu were one of the three principal groupings that formed following fragmentation of the Loikop society. Samburu historians interviewed by Straight et al. (2016) state that there was an initial fragmentation of Loikop society into three groupings and that one of these were 'the Laikipiak, who "went around Mount Kenya and northward"'. However, certain accounts note that the name 'Laikipiak' arose after their livestock were afflicted by rinderpest, after which they were called Lorere Lokipei ("people whose cattle have the disease").

At the dawn of the 19th century, the Uasin Gishu occupied the plateaus to the west and south-west of the Laikipia plateau. This group included small but notable sections of Loosekelai (i.e. Siger/Sigerai people)

=== Maasai ===
According to traditions captured by MacDonald (1899), the Maasai were one of the three principal groupings that formed following fragmentation of the Loikop society. Samburu historians interviewed by Straight et al. (2016) concur that there was an initial fragmentation into three groupings and that the Maasai were one of these.

== Conflict ==
=== Maasai - Enkangelema conflict ===
An early instance of conflict is that recorded between the Masai and Engánglima tribe who were pushed out of the plateaus later known as the Nyika in the 1820s and 1830s. This conflict is generally regarded as a prelude to the main Iloikop wars.

Krapf writing in 1854, as the Iloikop wars raged, wrote about the conflicts that affected the 'Engánglima tribe which occupied the vast territory situated between Usambara, Teita, and Ukambani...'. He notes that they;

...first received a mortal blow from their brethren the Masai, and afterwards from the united forces of the Wakamba, Wanika, Wasuahili and Wateita (and) in consequence of this disastrous catastrophe either disappeared, or retreated to the territory of other Wakuafi in order to escape utter destruction...

— Ludwig Krapf, 1854

=== Maasai - Kwavi conflict ===
New (quoted in Markakis) writing in 1873 recorded accounts of conflict between the Masai and a community he refers to as 'Wakwavi', he states that;

In the course of time, the Masai, emerging from the west, swept over the open plains, smote the Wakwavi and scattered them to the winds, leaving however the Wataveta in the forest fastness in perfect security. The Wakwavi, robbed of all and completely broken up, some wandered this way and some that, while some turning to their friends the Wataveta, asked and found refuge with them. Ever since, the two peoples have lived together, assimilating more and more to each other's habits and modes of life...

— New, 1873

A similar account was recorded by Thompson in 1883 as part of a broader account on the conflicts that had occurred. He notes that prior to the attack by the Maasai, the Kwavi whose original home comprised "the large district lying between Kilimanjaro, Ugono and Pare on the west, and Teita, and Usambara on the east" had suffered repulses in raids against the 'Wa-gogo' and later against the 'Kisongo', their land had also been afflicted by locusts and...;

While the Wa-kwafi were in this unhappy plight, the Masai of the plains to the west fell upon them and smote them hip and thigh, and thus broke up and revenged themselves upon the most powerful division of the tribe.

— Thompson, 1883

== Internecine conflict ==
The narratives recorded by MacDonald state that at the time of fragmentation of the Loikop peoples, there was a certain internal jealousy that gradually developed into open conflict. The conflict now referred to as the Iloikop wars. MacDonald noted that;

Civil war broke out between the Masai and Guash Ngishu who were helped by their kinsmen of Lykipia. After some initial defeats, the Masai detached the Sambur of Lykipia from the hostile alliance and then crushed the Guash Ngishu so utterly that the latter could no longer hold their own against the dispossessed Nandi and their kindred, and ceased to exist as a tribe.

— MacDonald, 1899

Thompson writing in 1883 also recorded accounts of the conflict, stating;

Grown bold, they attacked the Masai about fifteen years ago...The Masai were at first beaten, but fighting with the stubbornness of despair, they disputed every foot of the ground. They were driven from the whole of Naivasha and Kinangop, and their enemies still victorious, carried the war into Kapte. Matters now changed however. The Masai of the entire region to the south gathered together and came to the assistance of their brethren of Kapte. Soon the tables were turned and the Wa-kwafi were gradually forced back.

— Thompson, 1883

Stigand (1913) also made note of the decision and intention of the Laikipiak to "attack and completely overwhelm the southern Masai...that they might cease to exist as a tribe". However, "when the southern Masai heard that they were coming, they combined together and came forth to meet them. They met the Loikop north of Nakuru...". Stigand gave a detailed account of the battle, one that has been retold since within a number Kenyan of communities.

Thompson later recounts a trek past 'Giligili' where he noticed "an ernomous Masai kraal, which could not have held less than 3000 warriors, and then some distance beyond appeared another of equal, if not larger dimensions." On inquiry, Thompson learned that these were the respective camps of the Masai of Kinangop and Kapte, on the one hand, and the Masai (Wa-kwafi) of Lykipia on the other. He was told that this was; "During one of their long periods of deadly fighting, in which they thus settled down before all their cattle, and fought day after day, till one gave in".

== Diaspora ==
Krapf, Rebmann and Erhadt recognized that Iloikop society consisted of a number of sectional groups (which they called tribes), and each group was generally named for the geographical area they inhabited. Iloikop tribes who were noted as existing (or recently dispersed) in the mid-19th century included the Parakuyo, Enganglima, Mao, Baringo, Ndigiriri, Tigerei, Laikipiak, Modoni, Kopekope, Burkineji (also known as Samburu) and the Maasai tribes (who had separated considerably from the rest of the Iloikop regions.

Thompson (1893) recognized ten 'districts' that Masai country was divided into. He noted that individuals were generally designated by their native district. The districts he listed were; Sigirari, Njiri, Matumbato, Kapte, Dogilani, Lykipia and Guas' Ngishu.

Later historical accounts and Samburu oral tradition refer to two principal groups in Loikop society: the Samburu and the Laikipia. The Maasai are noted in these later accounts as speaking the same language (known today as Maa), although they are perceived as a different group.
