= Mutai =

Mutai may refer to:

- Mutai (name), a surname of Kalenjin (Kenyan) origin
- Mutai, meaning "son of Kimutai"
- Kinamutay, subtype of Filipino martial arts (commonly misspelled kino mutai)
- Two separate periods of wars (First Mutai and Second Mutai) which afflicted Kenya during the 19th century
