= Iloikop wars =

Series of wars between the Maasai and Kwavi communities

The Iloikop wars were a series of wars between the Maasai and a community referred to as Kwavi and later between Maasai and alliance of reformed Kwavi communities. These were pastoral communities that occupied large tracts of East Africa's savannas during the late 18th and 19th centuries. These wars occurred between c.1830 and 1880.

For these communities, a delicate balance existed between the amount of pasture land required for successful pastoralism and the number of men and animals available to exploit it effectively. It has been suggested that the Iloikop wars resulted from demographic pressure within these societies leading to congestion and conflict.

The Iloikop wars ended in the 1870s with the defeat and dispersal of the Laikipiak. However, the new territory acquired by the Maasai was vast and left them overextended thus unable to occupy it effectively.

== Background ==
Nile records indicate that the three decades starting about 1800 were marked by low rainfall levels in regions south of the Sahara. East African oral narratives and the few written records indicate peak aridity during the 1830s resulting in recorded instances of famine in 1829 and 1835 in Ethiopia and 1836 in Kenya. Among Kenyan Rift Valley communities this arid period, and the consequent series of events, have been referred to as Mutai.

A feature of the Mutai was increased conflict between neighboring communities, most noted of these has been the Iloikop wars. Earlier conflicts preceding the wars appear to have brought about the pressures that resulted in this period of conflict. Von Höhnel (1894) and Lamphear (1988) recorded narratives concerning conflict between the Turkana and Burkineji or at least the section recalled as Sampur that appear to have been caused by even earlier demographic pressures.

=== Turkana - Burkineji conflict ===
Turkana narratives recorded by Lamphear (1988) provide a broad perspective of the prelude to the conflict between the Turkana and a community he refers to as Kor, a name by which the Turkana still call the Samburu in the present day.

By the end of the Palajam initiations, the developing Turkana community was experiencing strong ecological pressures. Behind them, up the escarpment in Karamoja, other evolvig Ateker societies such as the Karimojong and Dodos were occupying all available grazing lands. Therefore Turkana cattle camps began to push further down the Tarash, which ran northwards below the foothills of the Moru Assiger massif on their right and the escarpment on their left. As they advanced, the Turkana came to realize they were not alone in this new land. At night fires could be seen flickering on the slopes of nearby mountains, including Mt. Pelekee which loomed up in the distance directly before them...

— John Lamphear, 1988

Lamphear notes that Tukana traditions aver that a dreamer among them saw strange animals living with the people up in the hills. Turkana warriors were thus sent forward to capture one of these strange beasts, which the dreamer said looked 'like giraffes, but with humps on their backs'. The young men therefore went and captured one of these beasts - the first camels the Turkana had seen. The owners of the strange beasts appear to have struck the Turkana as strange as well. The Turkana saw them as 'red' people, partly because of their lighter skin and partly because they daubed their hair and bodies with reddish clay. They thus gave them the name 'Kor'. Lamphear states that Turkana traditions agree that the Kor were very numerous and lived in close pastoral association with two other communities known as 'Rantalle' and 'Poran', the names given to the Cushitic speaking Rendille and Boran communities.

According to Von Höhnel (1894) "a few decades" prior, the Burkineji occupied districts on the west of the lake and that they were later driven eastwards into present day Samburu. He later states that "some fifty years ago the Turkana owned part of the land on the west now occupied by the Karamoyo, whilst the southern portion of their land belonged to the Burkineji. The Karamoyo drove the Turkana further east, and the Turkana, in their turn, pushed the Burkineji towards Samburuland".

=== Fragmentation ===
According to Maasai traditions recorded by MacDonald (1899), the expansion of early Eloegop (Loikop) communities into a society occurred from a base east of Lake Turkana on three fronts.

Pushing southward from the country east of Lake Turkana the Loikop conquered a number of communities to occupy the plateaus adjacent to the Rift Valley. On the eastern escarpment, one front occupied the plateau now known as Laikipia and brought the Ogiek there under their patronage. Another front continued the southward expansion to the southern plateaus, as far as or even beyond Mount Kilimanjaro. The third front occupied the western escarpment, conquering the 'Senguer' people who dwelt on the plateau now known as Uasin Gishu and almost annihilated this community.

This expansion was followed by the development of three groupings within the Loikop society. The Sambur who occupied the 'original' country east of Lake Turkana as well as the Laikipia plateau. The Guash Ngishu occupied the grass plateaus of the Uasin Gishu and Mau while the Maasai territory extended from Naivasha to Kilimanjaro. The mythological rendition of this account as recorded by Straight et al. (2016) states that "three Maa clan clusters – Loiborkineji, Maasai, and Laikipiak – came out together...from the (baobab) Tree of Tangasa".

Krapf writing in the mid-19th century, recognized two notable pastoral population groups in the East African hinterland. One of these, whom he referred to as Wakuafi (Kwavi) had territory that lay on the "broad, level, pasture land, which stretches to the south-east of the White Mountain". He noted that this district "is called Kaptei or Kaputei". He also noted that the "chief seat of the Masai" then was at "...mountain Samba", located south-west of Oldoinio eibor. Krapf states in a different account that "regarding Oldoinio eibor it is necessary to remark that by this term is meant the Kirénia or Endurkenia, or simply Kenia, as the Wakamba call it..."

== Maasai - Kwavi war: c.1830s ==
=== Enkangelema war ===
Contemporary understanding of the wars indicates that the Enkangelema sections of the Maasai occupied the steppes today known as the Nyika plateau. They were pushed out of the plateaus in the 1820s and 30s, most of the survivors fleeing westwards to Taveta or south to join the Parakuyo.

Ludwig Krapf (1854) recorded accounts of the Engánglima from Lemāsěgnǒt whose father was "Engobore, an Mkuafi of the tribe Engánglima" who had "married a woman in the Interior near Oldoinio eibŏr (white mountain)" by whom he got his son, Lemāsěgnǒt. Krapf notes that Engobore resolved to reside at a place called Muasuni which was situated on the upper course of the Pangani river in the vicinity of the kingdom of Usambara when he returned from the interior. Krapf states that "the reason which had induced Engobore to join the nomadic settlement of the Wakuafi tribe Barrabuyu...was because his own tribe Engánglima had during his stay in the interior been nearly annihilated by the wild Masai". His account of his informant alludes to a corporate identity that he refers to as 'Wakuafi' which had within it at least two sections, that he refers to as Engánglima and Barrabuyu.

Krapf noted that the Enganglima territory occupied the vast territory situated between Usambara, Teita and Ukambani. Thompson in 1883 wrote of the 'Wa-kwafi' and their territory which by his description is roughly contiguous with Engánglima territory as mentioned by Krapf. Thompson states that, "The original home of the (Wa-kwafi) was the large district lying between Kilimanjaro, Ugono and Parè on the west, and Teita and U-sambara on the east. This large region is known to the Masai as Mbaravui.

Krapf notes that the Engánglima;

...first received a mortal blow from their brethren the Masai, and afterwards from the united forces of the Wakamba, Wanika, Wasuahili and Wateita (and) in consequence of this disastrous catastrophe either disappeared, or retreated to the territory of other Wakuafi in order to escape utter destruction...

— Ludwig Krapf, 1854

According to Thompson's account, a 'series of misfortunes' fell upon the Kwavi about 1830 leading to the eventual collapse of the community. He states that;

In a great war-raid against the Wa-gogo to the south they suffered a severe repulse, and great numbers were slaughtered. The same disaster fell upon them shortly after, in a raid against their brethren of Kisongo. The saying that misfortunes never come singly was well exemplified by their case, for nature took up the work of ruin. A cloud of locusts settled on the land, and left not a blade of grass or other green thing, so that the cattle died in enormous numbers through starvation. While the Wa-kwafi were in this unhappy plight, the Masai of the plains to the west fell upon them and smote them hip and thigh, and thus broke up and revenged themselves upon the most powerful division of the tribe...

— Thompson, 1883

This attack and the subsequent scattering of the Kwavi were noted by other writers about the same time...

In the course of time, the Masai, emerging from the west, swept over the open plains, smote the Wakwavi and scattered them to the winds, leaving however the Wataveta in the forest fastness in perfect security. The Wakwavi, robbed of all and completely broken up, some wandered this way and some that, while some turning to their friends the Wataveta, asked and found refuge with them. Ever since, the two peoples have lived together, assimilating more and more to each other's habits and modes of life...

— New, 1873

=== Outcome ===
A number of traditions agree that the Kwavi were ejected from their homes, leading to the scattering of this community. The areas were depopulated and were for a time known as the Wakuafi wilderness. In 1857, after having depopulated the "Wakuafi wilderness" in what is now southeastern Kenya, Maasai warriors are reported to have threatened Mombasa on the Kenyan coast.

== Reformation: c.1840s/50s ==
According to Thompson's narrative, the Kwavi were not entirely annihilated 'for a large division of the clan kept together, and contrived to cut their way through Kikuyu and to reach Lyikipia where they settled. Another section crossed the meridional trough and reached the opposite half of the plateau in Guas' Ngishu'.

In both districts, they found superb grazing-grounds and plenty of elbow-room, and there for a time they remained quietly, and increased rapidly in numbers.

— Joseph Thompson

Stigand recorded traditions regarding "the old Laikipia Masai, the Loikop". According to his informants, the "country north of Gilgil and extending from this place to the Borana was in the old days called Laikipia". He notes that the "Masai inhabitants of this tract of land were called 'Loikop' or 'the people of the country called Laikipia'".

Stigand's accounts portray a picture of significant military activity during the reformation period. He portrays raiding activity directed north, east and south.

...As to (the old Laikipia Masai) the Loikop, they seem to have become very powerful, and their raids are alleged to have extended eastwards into Somaliland. Anyhow it is certain they raided down to Ngong, and the Borana say that they reached as far as Dirri, east of Lake Stephanie, at which place the Borana were on the verge of falling back still further before them, when they decided to make a last stand. So collecting all available men from far and wide, and many horses, they managed to drive them back out of their country

— Chauncy Hugh Stigand, 1913

== Laikipiak wars: c.1860s/70s ==
=== Combatants ===
Thompson (1883) noted that the 'Wa-kwafi' of Guas'Ngishu and those of Lykipia, having increased in numbers and grown bold, allied together to make war on the Maasai. He was advised that this was about fifteen years before then i.e. c.1870. Hollis in his account of the Maasai recorded similar narratives occurring about the same time. He notes "that about 1850 the Turkana drove the most westerly branch of the Masai from the west, to the south of (Lake Turkana)". He states that "somewhere about the same period - at the time an old man can remember according to the native expression - the Masai dwelling on the Uasin Gishu plateau attacked those of Naivasha". The Maasai of Naivasha would later ally with those of Kilimanjaro.

Berntsen (1979) notes that elders of the Purko-Kisongo Maasai relate that it was warriors of the Il Aimer age-set (c. 1870–1875) who blunted the attack of their northern neighbours the Ilaikipiak and then destroyed them as a social unit. The elders do not attribute the victory to the Maasai warriors to superior military strength but rather to the prophetic-ritual leadership of the famous laibon Mbatian who exploited his influence among several Purko-Kisongo sections to unite all the warriors of the Purko-Kisongo against the Ilaikipiak.

=== Prelude ===
According to Purko informants, the Purko and the Laikipiak allied to raid the Uasin Gishu during the warriorhood of the Il Nyankusi age-set (c. 1860s - 1870s). These traditions imply a joint or at least a coordinated attack. More recently, there has been scholarly speculation that some Purko sought charms and medicines from the prophet of the Ilaikipiak - Koikoti ole Tunai - whose kraal was located much closer to the Purko than was Mbatian's.

Following one of the Purko-Ilaikipak raids on the Uasin Gishu, the warriors of the Purko and those of the Ilaikipiak fell out over the distribution of the captured cattle. Details vary but a consistent element of the narrative claims that Kuiyoni, the speaker of the Purko warriors, instructed his warriors to take more than their share of cattle. Incensed, the Ilaikipiak warriors, guided by Koikoti, raided the Purko and the other sections around Naivasha, driving them completely from the region. A number of accounts suggest that the Ilaikipiak allied with the Uasin Gishu to exact revenge on the Purko.

The demoralized warriors and elders of the Purko then turned to their chief prophet Mbatian for aid. They appealed to him using various methods and were eventually successful in drawing him into the conflict. Mbatian directed warriors from other, uninvolved sections of the Purko-Kisongo to join the Purko and the other shattered sections to resist and destroy the Ilaikipiak.

=== Conflict ===
Many accounts of the late 19th century capture the conflict between the Maasai and the Laikipia/Uasin Gishu Kwavi alliance. They all note that this conflict ended in the subsequent annihilation of the latter.

Stigand for instance noted that the final extinction of the Laikipia arose due to conflict with the southern Maasai. His account includes reference to the Laikipia warriors jumping or being forced off a cliff which is similar to accounts later recorded in the folklore of modern Kenyan communities.

...they decided to attack and completely overwhelm the southern Masai...With this in view, they started down the Rift Valley, and as they feared being raided by their adversaries of the north whilst they were away, they brought the whole of their stock, women, children and belongings, with them.
When the southern Masai heard that they were coming, they combined together and came forth to meet them. They met the Loikop north of Nakuru (and) after a desperate encounter, the Loikop were gradually pushed backwards in a westerly direction. Not knowing the country, they were unaware that the crater of Menegai, whose wall drops sheer of the plain, was behind them.
When near the brink, the southern army redoubled the attack, and the Loikop turned suddenly to fly, and fled over the brink of the crater, those who were not killed by the enemy being precipitated to the bottom.

— Stigand, c.1919

==== Background ====
Prof. Ciarunji Chesaina (1991) wrote of conflict that occurred between "Sikyinet'ab Kaplong'ole" (the clan of long'ole district) and the Masai. The clan of long'ole are said to have lived on a 'flat-topped' mountain which was surrounded by a thick, thorny forest that was difficult to penetrate. This clan was strong, they are said to have defeated a number of neighboring clans becoming 'bonnikab bororionoto' (loosely rulers of their community). They subsequently became proud and in this air of arrogance pitted themselves against their distant rivals - the Maasai.

They are said to have goaded the Maasai to war by sending them a 'sharpening stone' with which to sharpen their spears. When the initial invitation to war was turned down, the warring Long'ole clan sent a second messenger with an even bigger sharpening stone.

==== Battle preparations ====
...the Long'ole elders prepared themselves for the big fight. Nights and days saw them sharpening their swords, spears and arrows. They also tightened their shield handles and slaughtered oxen daily and ate for strength. After a fortnight the Long'ole elders gathered all the able bodied men in preparation for imminent Maasai invasion. Some of them were assigned spying duties. Others were given horns for raising alarm. The bulk of the men formed the main regiment which surrounded the whole clan at the edges of the flat-topped mountain.

— Cherop Chemwetich, Tugen (approx. 90 years old in 1991)

==== Battle ====
One morning at dawn, (the Long'ole) were suddenly attacked by a powerful Maasai regiment which had escaped the sight of the unwary spies. They had decided to attack at night to avoid being seen by the spies. It had taken them half the night to cut through the thick thorny steep slopes of the mountain (i.e plateau). When they reached the edge of the land of the Long'ole clan, they quickly took their grounds and surrounded the clan. They briskly attacked from all sides, using their spears and swords.
The Long'ole defence force was taken aback and they frantically put up a frail, disorganised resistance. The Masai warriors easily overcame the Long'ole warriors and by sunrise they were at the center of the clan, having killed indiscriminately each and every enemy in their way.

— Cherop Chemwetich, Tugen (approx. 90 years old in 1991)

Joseph Thompson in 1883, came across a deserted village which he called Dondolè.

...Our route should have been nearly west, but it was impossible to climb the precipices. We were therefore compelled to keep almost due north, along a secondary line of fault...there were several lines of upheaval (or depression)..., being crowned by fine trees. Finally, about midday we emerged from the shattered sides of the escarpment and stood on the billowy expanse of the plateau at a height of 8400 feet. We camped shortly thereafter in a dense grove of Junipers, in which we found a deserted village of Andorobo - the hunting tribe of the Masai country. The district is called Dondolè, which I am informed, means "everybody's (that is to say - no man's land) from the incessant quarrels for possession that have taken place between the Maasai of Kinangop and the Masai (Wa-kwafi) of Lykipia.

— Joseph Thompson, 1883

=== Outcome ===
The Maasai acquired swathes of new land following success in the Iloikop Wars of the 1870s, however this created problems as they were unable to successfully occupy their new territories. By the early 1880s, Kamba, Kalenjin and Kikuyu raiders were making inroads into Maasai territory, and the Maasai were struggling to control their resources of cattle and grazing land.

Only two Loikop sections, Parakuyo and Sampur, managed to survive the Iloikop wars as intact pastoralist communities. By the end of the nineteenth century however, Maasai, and many outside observers began to think of all non-Maasai Loikop as socially inferior sub-set of the now dominant Maasai community.
