= Second Mutai =

Drought in Kenya

Mutai (Maa; meaning Disaster) is a term used by the Maa-speaking communities of Kenya to describe a period of wars, usually triggered by disease and/or drought affecting widespread areas of the Rift Valley region of Kenya. According to Samburu and Maasai tradition, two periods of Mutai occurred during the nineteenth century. The second Mutai lasted from the 1870s to the 1890s.

The Pokot use the term the "Time the Country Became Dark" to refer to the period during the 1880s and 1890s, when the Pokot area suffered through a number of disasters, including a rinderpest epidemic, other stock diseases, drought, mass starvation, and smallpox.

== Prelude ==
Prior to the second Mutai, there were two major ethnic groups that occupied the Rift Valley region. On the western highlands of the Rift were the Sirikwa communities. Many were reforming following Sirikwa societal collapse during the first Mutai. Occupying the eastern highlands were the Loikop communities. Their territory stretched north and west of Mount Kenya, and south to Naivasha across the Kaputei plains as far as and possibly past Kilimanjaro.

The language now known as Maa was spoken by the Loikop society while that now known as Kalenjin was spoken by the Sirikwa society, both had multiple dialects. Many individuals, particularly on the borders, were multi-lingual in both languages.

The individuals within both societies self-referenced as "People of the 'mouth'" – Pich-ap Kutit (Sirikwa/Kalenjin) and Enguduk Iloikop (Loikop).

These societies shared a number of cultural aspects, most notably, similar learning systems designed to train young men into a fighting force known as moran/muren and later elders who would guide the community. They also shared similar rituals surrounding initiation as well as day to day cultural practices such as an affinity for bead-work. Each of these societies was composed of what can be understood as tribes which shared common ethnic cultural traits but also had distinct differences in cultural practices.

Both societies practiced a pastoral lifestyle though there were communities such as the Chok section of the re-acculturating Pokot community, that relied on both the rain and elaborate irrigation canals to grow grains.

The Loikop society had expanded their territories in the period leading up to the first Mutai. This expansion was followed by the development of three groupings within the Loikop society. The Sambur who occupied the 'original' country east of Lake Turkana as well as the Laikipia plateau. The Uasin Gishu occupied the grass plateaus of the Uasin Gishu and Mau while the Maasai territory extended from Naivasha to Kilimanjaro.

Traditions note that at the time of this division of communities, there was a certain internal jealousy that gradually developed into open conflict.

This conflict grew into a series of civil wars, now known as the Iloikop wars. The Iloikop wars ended in the 1870s with the defeat and dispersal of the Laikipiak. However, the new territory acquired by the Maasai was vast and left them overextended thus unable to occupy it effectively. This left them open to encroachment by other communities. By the early 1880s, Kamba, Kalenjin and Kikuyu raiders were making inroads into Maasai territory, and the Maasai were struggling to control their resources of cattle and grazing land.

Just as the Iloikop wars ended and conflict with neighboring communities started, two instances of epizootics broke out among Loikop herds in quick succession. In 1883, bovine Pleuro-Pneumonia spread from the north and lingered for several years. The effect of this was to cause the Loikop to regroup and to go out raiding more aggressively to replenish their herds. This was followed by a far more serious outbreak of Rinderpest which occurred in 1891. The damage to the Loikop herds as a result of the two outbreaks was quite high, with mortality rates of 90% estimated.

Compounding the wars and epizootic was the Aoyate drought, an acute meteorological drought that affected much of the Rift Valley region of Kenya at the end of the 18th century.

=== Social climate ===
Folklore of the present-day communities gives the image of a decadent period preceding the second Mutai- an analysis of popular Samburu legends indicated a general theme of pride and disrespect resulting in Nkai "finishing" all of the Samburu with the Mutai.

== Events ==
=== Epizootics ===
Two instances of epizootics are recorded to have broken out among Loikop herds in quick succession during the Mutai. In 1883, bovine Pleuro-Pneumonia spread from the north and lingered for several years. The effect of this was to cause the Loikop to regroup and to go out raiding more aggressively to replenish their herds. This was followed by a far more serious outbreak of Rinderpest which occurred in 1891. The damage to the Loikop herds as a result of the two outbreaks was quite high, with mortality rates of 90% estimated.

=== Conflict ===
The Maasai acquired swathes of new land following success in the Iloikop wars of the 1870s, however, this created problems as they were unable to successfully occupy this new area. This left them open to encroachment by other communities. By the early 1880s, Kamba, Kalenjin and Kikuyu raiders were making inroads into Maasai territory, and the Maasai were struggling to control their resources of cattle and grazing land.

=== Killing of Kimnyole ===
Starting about 1888, disaster struck the Nandi in the form of rinderpest cattle disease. This signalled the start of trouble for Kimnyole, the Nandi Orkoiyot at the time.

Kimnyole was blamed for not having warned the warriors who went out to raid and brought back rinderpest. It was noted that only his cattle had not died. He was also accused of sanctioning a combined raid of Nandi bororiosiek that had resulted in disaster when large numbers of Nandi warriors were killed.

Kimnyole Arap Turukat was thus sentenced to death in 1890 and was clubbed to death by representatives of some bororiosiek.

== Descriptions ==
=== Epizootics ===
When my father was young, he and his family enjoyed the many blessings of Pokot life on Cheptulel mountain. Their log-terraced gardens, irrigated by the carved “bridge of water” leading from the cool mountain streams, always produced enough grain to supplement the milk, blood and meat of their large herd of cattle and goats. But when father became a youth like me, a great epidemic suddenly destroyed most of the herds, and even wild animals, throughout the land. This was The Time the Country Became Dark. Tororut saved only enough beasts to become the seeds of new herds. Indeed, no one was spared, but those, like my father’s family, who lived in the cooler hills, fared better than most. Three of our family’s cattle survived.

— Domonguria

"... there arose a wizard among the Suk who prepared a charm in the form of a stick, which he placed in the Loikop cattle kraals, with the result that they all died."

— Pokot tradition

"What!" said they, "do you not know that our cattle are dying in hundreds on all hands? You are a great lybon; you must stay with us and stop the plague."

— Joseph Thomson, c.1883

=== Conflict ===
After the dying (from epizootics) stopped, desperate strangers began to roam the land, checking the homes of relatives, friends and cattle associates, where they may have been keeping stock, in the hope that some had survived. Likewise, men sometimes traveled great distances trying to breed the one or two animals they had left. Then, as the threat of starvation increased, bands of thieves began to steal and eat more fortunate men’s animals, murdering the owners if necessary.

— Domonguria

Leaving Becil, we made a capital march north...over undulating grazing grounds...dotted here and there with kraals. Which however, were deserted, owing to recent raids of Wa-kamba, who of late have begun to assume the offensive and make reprisals in cattle-lifting in the heart of the enemy's country.

— Joseph Thomson, c.1883

== Consequences for Sirikwa society ==
=== Establishment of the Pokot ===
The emerging Pokotozek crossed into the Kerio Valley leading to conflict with, and the defeat of the Loikop at Baringo. According to Pokot traditions, the victory came when "... there arose a wizard among the Suk who prepared a charm in the form of a stick, which he placed in the Loikop cattle kraals, with the result that they all died."

After defeating the Loikop, a settlement was established at En-ginyang (about 48 kilometers north of Lake Baringo). This event signified the establishment of the pastoral Chok, i.e. Pokot, community.

=== Assimilation of the Chok community ===
As the emerging Pokot community established itself, a desire arose many Chok to adopt pastoralist culture. The aim and ambition of every agricultural Chok became to amass enough cattle to move into the Kerio Valley and join their pastoral kin. They achieved this through attaining cattle as the bride-price of their female relations or through adoption, in the latter case, poor Chok youth would be adopted by members of the emerging Pokot community primarily as herds-boys. By the early 20th century, the Pokot community was expanding as many of the Chok joined their rank and by that time, many Pokot who were termed Suk by the colonial administrators did not recognize this name for their tribe.

=== Acculturation of the Lumbwa ===
Kimnyole's death led to a succession dispute between his two sons; Koitalel Arap Samoei and Kipchomber Arap Koilege. Factions formed around the two aspirants and minor skirmishes took place between their supporters but this did not extend to full-scale war. The dispute ended with the defeat of Kipchomber Arap Koilege in 1895, after which he fled to the Kipsigis with his supporters, becoming the first Kipsigis Orgoiyot.

== Consequences for Loikop society ==
Following decades of civil war, the Loikop society had begun to fall into decline by the 1880s. On the southern and eastern borders neighboring communities such as the Kamba, Kikuyu and Kalenjin were encroaching on Loikop territory and the Loikop retaliatory raids were increasingly less successful. Meanwhile, the emerging Turkana and Pokot communities were pressing in on the north-western borders.

The sum of traditions of these communities indicate that the Iloikop wars were followed by conflict with neighboring societies after which the Loikop disintegrated and settled by clans in specific territories.

=== Conflict with the Pokot community ===
The Loikop western border followed the base of the Elgeyo Escarpment. This border was breached by the Pokot, who attacked the Loikop at En-ginyang (about 48 kilometers north of Lake Baringo) shortly after Loikop cattle were decimated by disease. The Loikop were pushed east into their heartland, although a small minority fled south and formed the Ilchamus community.

Thompson (1883) in journey through Masai land, came upon 'Masai' warriors that "had been gorging themselves with flesh in the forest for some time, preparatory to going off on a great cattle-raid to the Suk country, north of Baringo".

Following his Juba expedition, MacDonald (1899) wrote of the Sambur – who had been 'weakened by the civil war' and had been attacked 'by the (Pokotozek) who lived on the southern portion of the Karamojo plateau'. The (Pokotozek) "were being expelled from their country by an advancing Karamojo wave".

=== Conflict with Rendile & Bantu communities ===
MacDonald (1899) noted that the Pokotozek incursion and subsequent conquest at Enginyang 'practically cut off the Sambur of Njemps from those of (Lake Turkana)'. The Sambur of Lake Turkana he noted, had to "deal with the growing power of the Rendile...and the isolated Sambur of Njemps were shorn of their power under the attacks of two small villages near the south of Lake Baringo. The Sambur of Lykipia, weakened by war and isolation and impoverished by cattle plague, were in turn subject to attacks by the Rendile and are now almost, if not quite destroyed".

According to Yaaku tradition, a bloody war between the Loikop and Murutu (who were, by this time, perceived as non-Loikop) broke out some time after the tribal wars at a place the Yaaku call Oldoinyo esarge (Blood Hill), the Tigania call it Ntugi Hill and have traditions of the battle at Ntugi Hill. The battle at Blood Hill coincided with attacks by mounted Ilturjo from the north, and the wars on both fronts wiped out a singular Sambur identity.

Tigania traditions record pushing the Loikop (or portions of them) into the raiding range of the Il Tikirri and Mumunyot. This sustained pressure led to the gradual disintegration of Sambur communities as their herds were seized from all sides. Sambur children were seized, and captive warriors were adopted by Meru clans.

=== Conflict with Nandi community ===
The Iloikop wars saw the routing of the Uasin Gishu by a combined force of the Naivasha and Laikipia sections of Loikop society. The Nandi then defeated the remnants of the Uasin Gishu at a battle in the Kipkaren Valley, as they had tried to reassert their claim to the plateau.

Shortly after, the Laikipiak were defeated by the Naivasha such that the latter were left as the only military power strong enough to contest the grazing rights to the Uasin Gishu plateau with the rising Nandi.

Several inconclusive skirmishes took place between the two until eventually, the Naivasha were routed at Siwa and chased back into the Rift Valley. Thus the Nandi had unchallenged access to the pastures and salt licks throughout the extensive Uasin Gishu plateau. Loikop cattle and captives swelled the Nandi animal and human populations.

=== Societal collapse ===
Over the course of the second Mutai of the 19th century, Loikop society suffered a series of events that devastated their society. The combined effects of the Aoyate drought and the epizootics led to near total loss of their herds, their primary means of livelihood.

Further, conflict on multiple fronts with neighboring communities had resulted in a series of defeats. On the northern fronts, the Loikop had suffered defeats to the Pokot at Enginyang and to Bantu communities at Blood Hill. On the west they had suffered defeats to the Nandi at Kipkaren and Siwa leading to the annihilation of the Uasin Gishu community.

The totality of losses, resulting from these events and conflicts, has been noted in many traditions to have wiped out a singular Loikop identity.

== Post-Mutai ==
=== Maasai-British relations ===
In the late 1880s, the Imperial British East Africa Company (IBEAC) increasingly came into contact with the Maasai. Relations between the British and the Maasai grew close as co-operation offered benefits to both sides. In 1893 the Maasai asked Frank Hall, the British commander at Fort Smith, to mediate a truce between local Maasai and the Kikuyu and later that year, over three hundred Maasai survivors of a raid sought protection at Fort Smith. In 1895, the British government took over the possessions of the IBEAC and established the East Africa Protectorate over its former territories. The following year, they began construction of the Uganda Railway. The British, hampered by a lack of money and troops, were unable to risk antagonising the Maasai who controlled their lines of communication. The government therefore adopted a policy of appeasement towards the Maasai, using warriors in expeditions and for security on the railway and in return they offered military protection which allowed the Maasai to replenish their herds from raids on neighbouring tribes.

After 1900, the interests of the British and the Maasai began to diverge. With the completion of the railway the British no longer feared their lines of communication being disrupted, taxation was introduced in the Protectorate providing the government a regular source of income, and a permanent military force was instituted in 1902. For the Maasai, the end of the War of Morijo resulted in greater stability within their community, and cattle herds had largely been replenished. The government passed a series of measures signalling the end of their arrangement with the Maasai tribe, including forbidding unofficial looting, discontinuing the policy of raising levies and issuing a strict code of conduct for punitive expeditions.

== See also ==
- First Mutai
