= Burkineji people =

Pastoral community in northern Kenya

The Burkineji were a pastoral community who inhabited regions of northern Kenya through to the late 19th century. The present day Samburu consider themselves a descendant community of the Burkineji.

== Etymology ==
Stigand (1913) noted that "L'ol eborekeneji" was a Maa term meaning 'the people of the white goats'.

== Territory ==
Von Höhnel (1894) writing following his journey to Lake Turkana, noted that the Burkineji originally occupied districts on the west of Lake Turkana.

== History ==
=== c.1730 Bantu interaction ===
Meru traditions recorded by Fadiman, indicate that a Maa-speaking community recalled as 'Muoko', a name that has been linked to Kor/Sambur, occupied the Tigania plain during the 1730s when contact with the pre-Meru clans occurred. The Muoko are recalled as being "more numerous" than their neighbors though seemingly less so than the incoming migrants. These traditions portray conflict occurring between the Muoko and pre-Meru.

Tiganian warriors took the Muoko by surprise, seizing "four great herds" in an initial skirmish, then moved livestock, women, children, and the aged into a single, defensible camp. The Muoko, perhaps initially outnumbered, reacted by barring the intruders from both water and salt, systematically burying salt licks and springs to prevent their discovery and use. The Muoko also had stabbing spears, a weapon Tiganians could not forge. They responded with bow and arrow, ambushing Muoko herders in the long grass ("they crept like rats" sang the Muoko of their foes) and stampeding their herds.

— J. Fadiman, 1994

Fadiman notes that the traditions speak of "decades" of war though suggests that it was more likely a time of dry-season raiding on both sides. During this time the Tiganians mastered the art of forging spears following which the 'Muoko' were forced steadily into the arid northeast away from the fertile grassland region.

=== c.1830 Fragmentation ===
Samburu historians interviewed by Straight et al. (2016) state that the Samburu separated from an agglomeration known as Burkineji. They note that the Samburi Loiborkineji separated from the other Maa-speakers in the wake of the 1830s mutai.

== Turkana - Burkineji conflict ==
Turkana narratives recorded by Lamphear (1988) provide a broad perspective of the prelude to the conflict between the Turkana and a community he refers to as Kor, a name by which the Turkana still call the Samburu in the present day.

By the end of the Palajam initiations, the developing Turkana community was experiencing strong ecological pressures. Behind them, up the escarpment in Karamoja, other evolving Ateker societies such as the Karimojong and Dodos were occupying all available grazing lands. Therefore Turkana cattle camps began to push further down the Tarash, which ran northwards below the foothills of the Moru Assiger massif on their right and the escarpment on their left. As they advanced, the Turkana came to realize they were not alone in this new land. At night fires could be seen flickering on the slopes of nearby mountains, including Mt. Pelekee which loomed up in the distance directly before them...

— John Lamphear, 1988

Lamphear notes that Tukana traditions aver that a dreamer among them saw strange animals living with the people up in the hills. Turkana warriors were thus sent forward to capture one of these strange beasts, which the dreamer said looked 'like giraffes, but with humps on their backs'. The young men therefore went and captured one of these beasts - the first camels the Turkana had seen. The owners of the strange beasts appear to have struck the Turkana as strange as well. The Turkana saw them as 'red' people, partly because of their lighter skin and partly because they daubed their hair and bodies with reddish clay. They thus gave them the name 'Kor'. Lamphear states that Turkana traditions agree that the Kor were very numerous and lived in close pastoral association with two other communities known as 'Rantalle' and 'Poran'. These are analogous with the present day Rendille and Boran communities.

According to Von Höhnel (1894) "a few decades" prior, the Burkineji occupied districts on the west of the lake and that they were later driven eastwards into present day Samburu. He later states that "some fifty years ago the Turkana owned part of the land on the west now occupied by the Karamoyo, whilst the southern portion of their land belonged to the Burkineji. The Karamoyo drove the Turkana further east, and the Turkana, in their turn, pushed the Burkineji towards Samburuland".

At the time of Von Höhnel's visit the Burkineji and 'Randille' had previously frequented the shores of the lake but had stopped as at that time due to frequent attacks by the Turkana.

== Loikop ==
According to traditions recorded by MacDonald, the Loikop society fragmented as it expanded from a territory located east of Lake Turkana. This led to the development of three groupings within Loikop society. The Sambur who occupied the 'original' country east of Lake Turkana as well as the Laikipia plateau. The Uasin Gishu occupied the grass plateaus of the Uasin Gishu and Mau while the Maasai territory extended from Naivasha to Kilimanjaro.

=== Rendile - Sambur conflict ===
The Sambur of Lykipia, weakened by war and isolation and impoverished by cattle plague, were in turn subject to attacks by the Rendille, and are now almost if not quite destroyed.

— MacDonald, 1889

=== Smallpox ===
Arkell-Hardwick records that the Burkineji survived a smallpox epidemic, which seems to have affected their neighbors earlier, by sending the young men away to different camps. The Rendille, previously powerful, had not been so fortunate and had been greatly impacted by the epidemic. By the time of Arkell-Hardwick's writing they had come under the protection of the Burkineji who "were perfectly willing to protect the Rendili, but in return they considered that they ought to be allowed the right to help themselves from the Rendili flocks..."

=== Somali conflict ===
Arkell-Hardwick, an ivory hunter who visited north Kenya in at the turn of the 19th century wrote of a 'Burkineji' community living in association with a community he referred to as 'Rendili'. He records that at some prior point the 'Burkineji and Rendili' had allied together to fight the Ogaden Somali. During this conflict the Somali were armed with old muzzle-loading guns, using very inferior powder and spherical bullets which "..The Rendili declared...they were able to stop or turn...using their shields".

== Late-19th century ==
Arkell-Hardwick made note of Von Honnel's mention of "Rendili inhabiting the largest of the three islands in the south end of (Lake Turkana), the other two being occupied by Burkineji and Reshiat. He also speaks of settlements of mixed Rendili and Burkineji in the western portion of the Reshiat country, at the north end of the lake..". He notes that at the time, there were populations of Burkineji on 'Mount Nyiro' where they had settled to escape attacks by the Turkana.

=== Turkana raids ===
In May 1888, Von Honnel heard from a Burkineji woman that the Turkana had suffered a severe scarcity about three months before then, it seems these prompted raids on the Burkineji and Rendille. The second of these raids, during which the Turkana captured a number of livestock, had recently occurred and as a result "all the people of the plundered districts, Burkineji and Randille alike, had combined to make an incursion on Turkana".

=== Way of life ===
The Burkineji were pastoralists and had large herds of donkeys, though at least as of the late 19th century, they did not keep horses as their neighbors the Rendille did.

Most of the Burkineji of the late 19th century, wore cloth referred to as "lassos" of which they had a preference for gaudily colored types. They spoke Masai but most understood the Rendille language.
