= Kinam (Mexico) =

Kinam is a modern exercise system based on Toltec philosophy and practices, drawn from written documentation and from sculptures, codices, and murals.

== Components ==
Kinam includes static poses, stretches, and other exercises. It also incorporates practices relating to sleep and dreams.

== Comparisons and connections to other practices ==
It has been compared to yoga, although it developed separately. It shares etymological convergence with the martial arts of Kinamutay, also an exercise-system, in the Philippines, wherein Filipinos adopted Nahuatl terminological influence, when the Mexican Viceroyalty of New Spain once ruled the Philippines.

As of 2025, it is a trending alternative to yoga in Mexico.
