= Ninja Spirit (video series) =

Series of martial arts parody videos

Ninja Spirit is a series of martial arts parody videos that focus on the adventures of the eponymous character, Ninja Spirit.

== Overview ==
Ninja Spirit is presented as a series of TV episodes, each featuring a battle between Ninja Spirit and one or more villains. Every episode is between one and six minutes long and begins with Ninja Spirit welcoming the audience and introducing the guests for that particular program. A battle takes place, and Ninja Spirit is typically defeated in some comical fashion.

There are currently nine released episodes of Ninja Spirit, with an extended length Ninja Spirit film, Ninja Spirit X - Enter the Insanity in post-production.

== Production style ==
The series is shot in a unique style that blends traditional live action video/film production with elements from Japanese anime cartoons such as Dragon Ball Z. This is particularly evident in Ninja Spirit when a character flies into (or back from) an attack. A still frame cutout of their face or body is superimposed over a blurred background that appears to move opposite to the character's supposed direction of travel, creating the illusion of a high speed jump or flight.

The show also plays on the stereotype of poorly dubbed Asian films, where the dubbed dialogue is often poorly synced with the on screen actors' mouth movements. The Ninja Spirit series recreates this effect intentionally, even though the actors are English speakers and the show is also in English.

Ninja Spirit episodes are conceptualized, shot, edited, and released all in one day.

The series includes homages and references to many films such as Enter the Dragon, Star Wars, The Matrix, and the James Bond films.

Ninja Spirit episodes 1-5 were shot on VHS-C. Episode 6 used DVCAM, and all episodes after that were shot on MiniDV.

== Acclaim ==
Ninja Spirit has been featured at such events as the Penn State CAN Film Festival and the Johns Hopkins student film show. It was also mentioned in a feature article in Baltimore Magazine.

== Characters ==
Ninja Spirit, the series' title character is an ill-fated martial artist who, despite supposedly great martial prowess, is continually defeated and embarrassed by his enemies. He is typically depicted in a Taekwondo dobok with a black belt and red headband.

First introduced in Episode 2, Wang is Ninja Spirit's partner. He has been shown wearing a variety of Taekwondo uniforms with either an orange, green, or black belt.

The Bien Clan includes a variety of villain characters such as Tuxedo Bien, Disco Bien, and Bushido Bien. Each character has a unique uniform and fighting style.

Evil Ninja Spirit is Ninja Spirit's dark twin. He wears a dark uniform and kung fu belt.

Evil Ninja Spirit's partner, Gnaw, is a twisted and animal-like version of Wang. He employees a variety of bites and scratches in his fighting style, similar to the Filipino art of kinamutay.

== Episodes ==
Episode	Title	Released
1	"Ninja Spirit"	April 30, 1998
2	"Ninja Spirit Gets a Partner"	April 11, 1999
3	"The Evil Infamous Disco Bien"	ca. August 1999
4	"The Evil Infamous Tuxedo Bien"	ca. March 2000
5	"The Evil Infamous Dark Ninja Spirit"	ca. April 2000
6	"Freestyle Fighting"	ca. June 2000
7	"The Evil Infamous Darth Boz"	ca. June 2000
8	"Super Gnaw"	ca. March 2001
9	"The Evil Infamous Bushido Bien"	ca. May 2005
10	"Ninja Spirit X - Enter the Insanity"	Not yet released
