= Kwavi =

Kwavi may refer to:

- the Kwavi tribe
- the Kwavi dialect
