= First Mutai =

Maa term for disaster

Mutai (Maa; meaning Disaster) is a term used by the Maa-speaking communities of Kenya to describe a period of wars, usually triggered by disease and/or drought and affecting widespread areas of the Rift Valley region of Kenya. According to Samburu and Maasai folklore, periods of Mutai occurred during the nineteenth century.

== Prelude ==
Prior to the first Mutai of the nineteenth century, much of the Rift Valley region in Kenya had been occupied by the Sirikwa societies - sedentary pastoralists who had developed an iron-age culture underpinned by raising livestock, complemented by grain growing, over a period of six hundred years. Archaeological and linguistic evidence shows that they traded locally for goods such as grains, pottery and weaponry while connections to international markets in the East, supplied foreign goods most probably in exchange for ivory.

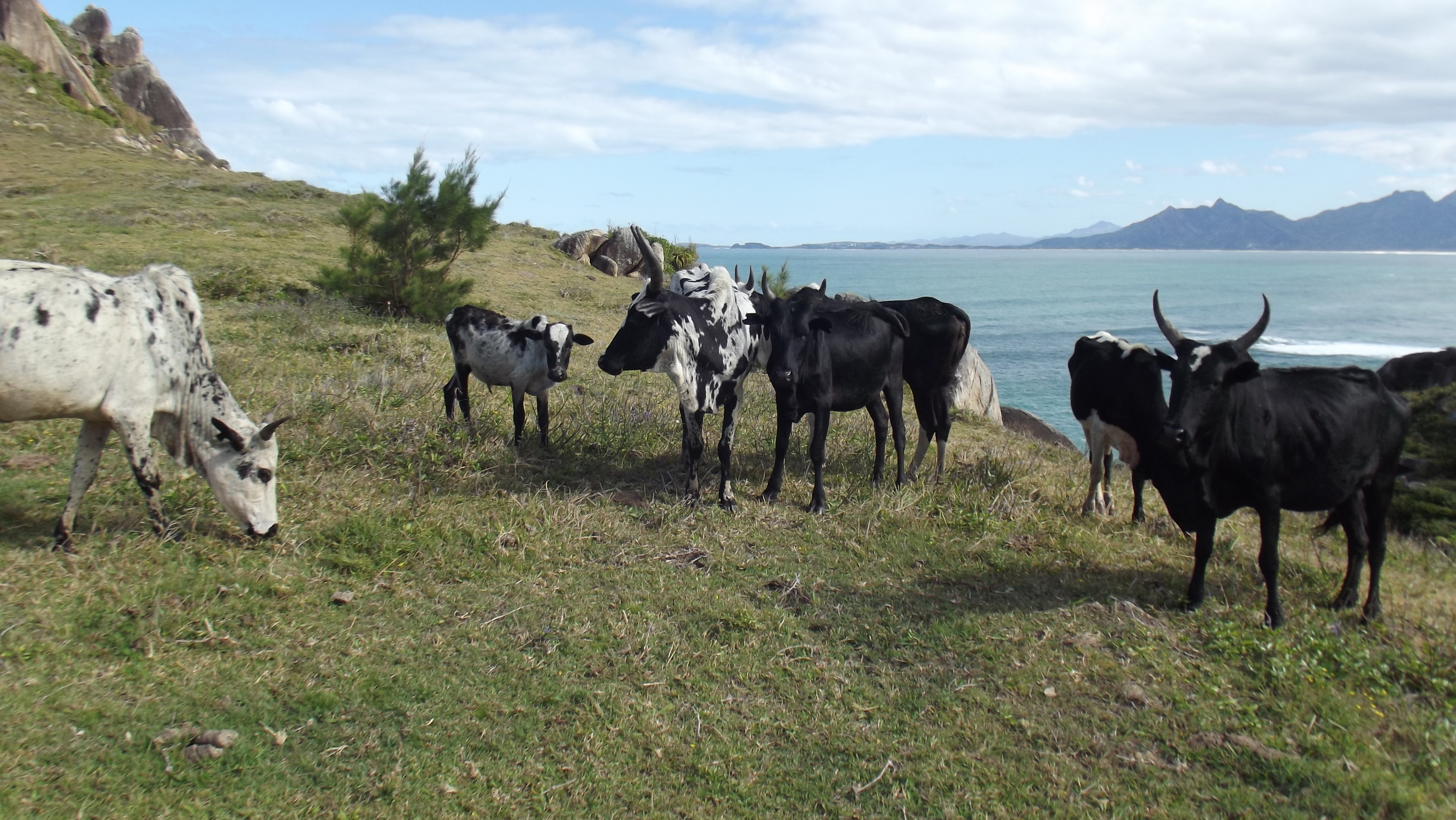
The adoption of the hardy Zebu cattle allowed for longer distance transhumance

At the start of the 18th century, Eastern Nilotic-speaking societies began a dramatic expansion from points in north-eastern Uganda. This is thought to have been set off by their acquisition of Zebu cattle, a hardier breed than they previously kept, allowing for longer distance transhumance and exploitation of drier areas of East Africa.

By the close of the 18th century, the Ateker-speaking, Karamojong cluster of these societies were pressing on the west and north-western borders of the Sirikwa societies. These communities had retained commercial relations with their kin in the land of the Jie, notably importing ironware made by the Luo-speaking Labwor blacksmiths of western Karamajong. They used this to make spears, knives and other weapons, generally believed to have been of a higher quality than what was available to the Sirikwa societies.

Central to the Eastern Nilotic speaking societies’ worldview was the concept that all cattle on earth belonged to them as a divine gift. Cattle were, and to an extent still are, seen as being a major source of life, pride and death. Thus if another community owned well-fed cattle with long twisted horns, cattle with dappled hides, designed neck-flaps, serrated ears etc., all seen as enhancing the beauty of cattle, then chances are young Turkana men would raid such cattle.

Towards the end of the 18th century, a drought captured in folklore as the Aoyate—the long dry time—struck.

== Triggers ==
=== Aoyate ===
The Aoyate drought was an acute meteorological drought that affected much of the Rift Valley region of Kenya at the turn of the 19th century. Lamphear (1988) recorded traditions among the Turkana people regarding the Aoyate and he noted that chronological reckonings based on the Turkana age-set system suggested a date in the late eighteenth or early nineteenth centuries. He notes that concurrent drought traditions suggested in the chronological reconstruction of neighboring communities indicates that the drought affected much of the Rift Valley region.

Records of Nile flood stages date back to the 7th century AD and an analysis of the flood patterns and comparison to water levels in Lake Chad revealed a correlation between high Nile discharge and greater rainfall in equatorial East Africa. The analysis of Nile flood stages indicates a "Minor Low" for the period 1800 to 1830, preceded by a "Minor High" during the years 1725 to 1800 and followed by a "Minor High" which lasted between 1830 and 1870.

Studies in Ethiopia by Pankhurst indicated major famines in 1880–1881, 1835 and in 1829. These studies are significant in that the country of Ethiopia borders present-day Turkana County. Meanwhile, Samburu historians interviewed by Straight et al. (2016) state that the Samburu separated from a society known as Burkineji in the wake of the 1830s Mutai. They relate this event to a period of extreme hunger and also associate it with the initiation of the Lkipiku age-set. According to a Samburu Laibon interviewed by Fratkin (2011), the Sambur 'Il Kipkeku' age-set were warriors during the period c.1837-1851.

The various narratives, records and reports thus point to a long dry period starting about 1800 seemingly peaking with an intensely arid time during the mid-1830s. This would be congruent with Krapf's (1860) mention of a "great famine of 1836".

== Consequences for Maliri ==
=== Conflict with Turkana ===
According to traditions recorded by Wilson (1970), a community known as Maliri were pushed eastward to the vicinity of Koten mountain by Jie incursion into their territory. The Maliri previously occupied what are today Jie and Dodoth regions in Uganda. A section of the Jie, by then calling themselves Turkana, later broke off from the main Jie body and continued an eastward advance.

The Turkana advance brought extreme pressure to bear on the Maliri at Koten causing that group to split into two. One section came to be known as Merille, while the other referred to themselves as Pokotozek.

=== Establishment of the Merille ===
The Merille who as late as 1970 were still known to the Karimojong as Maliri moved further eastward from their rest point at Koten, settling somewhere east of the Turkana escarpment. Here they again had encounters with the Turkana causing them to move further northward and eastward towards present-day Lake Turkana where they settled at Lokitaung. Here again, the Turkana harried them and pushed them into their present homeland in the Omo Valley in southern Ethiopia.

=== Establishment of the Pokotozek ===
The Pokotozek moved south, arriving at Nakiloro which lies on the lip of the Turkana escarpment just north of Moroto mountain, where they stayed for a short while before moving further south, proceeding down the eastern side of the Chemorongit and Cherangani mountains before finally branching off in the direction of Lake Baringo.

== Consequences for Turkana ==
=== Conflict with Burkineji ===
Turkana narratives recorded by Lamphear (1988) provide a broad perspective of the prelude to the conflict between the Turkana and a community he refers to as Kor, a name by which the Turkana still call the Samburu in the present day.

By the end of the Palajam initiations, the developing Turkana community was experiencing strong ecological pressures. Behind them, up the escarpment in Karamoja other evolving Ateker societies such as the Karimojong and Dodos were occupying all available grazing lands. Therefore Turkana cattle camps began to push further down the Tarash, which ran northwards below the foothills of the Moru Assiger massif on their right and the escarpment on their left. As they advanced, the Turkana came to realize they were not alone in this new land. At night fires could be seen flickering on the slopes of nearby mountains, including Mt. Pelekee which loomed up in the distance directly before them...

— John Lamphear, 1988

Lamphear notes that Tukana traditions aver that a dreamer among them saw strange animals living with the people up in the hills. Turkana warriors were thus sent forward to capture one of these strange beasts, which the dreamer said looked 'like giraffes, but with humps on their backs'. The young men therefore went and captured one of these beasts - the first camels the Turkana had seen. The owners of the strange beasts appear to have struck the Turkana as strange as well. The Turkana saw them as 'red' people, partly because of their lighter skin and partly because they daubed their hair and bodies with reddish clay. They thus gave them the name 'Kor'. Lamphear states that Turkana traditions agree that the Kor were very numerous and lived in close pastoral association with two other communities known as 'Rantalle' and 'Poran'. These are analogous to the present-day Rendille and Boran communities.

According to Von Höhnel (1894) "a few decades" prior, the Burkineji occupied districts on the west of the lake and they were later driven eastwards into present day Samburu. He later states that "some fifty years ago the Turkana owned part of the land on the west now occupied by the Karamoyo, whilst the southern portion of their land belonged to the Burkineji. The Karamoyo drove the Turkana further east, and the Turkana, in their turn, pushed the Burkineji towards Samburuland".

At the time of Von Höhnel's visit the Burkineji and 'Randille' had previously frequented the shores of the lake but had stopped as at that time due to frequent attacks by the Turkana.

=== Conflict with Siger ===
Lamphear states that Turkana narratives indicate that at the time of interaction with the 'Kor', the Turkana were in even closer proximity to a community referred to as Siger. This was the Karamoja name for the community and derived from an adornment that this community favored. The Siger like the Kor, were seen as a 'red' people, they are also remembered as a 'heterogeneous, multi-lingual confederation, including Southern and Eastern Nilotic-speakers, and those who spoke Cushitic dialects'. According to Turkana traditions the Siger once held most of the surrounding country 'until the Kor and their allies came up from the south and took it from them. In the process, the Kor and Siger had blended to some extent'.

According to Lamphear's account, Turkana traditions directly relate the collapse of the 'Siger' to the Aoyate. He notes that;

...as Turkana cattle camps began making contact with these alien populations and their strange livestock, the area was beset by a terrible drought, the Aoyate, 'the long dry time'...The Siger community was decimated and began to collapse. Some abandoned their mountain and fled eastwards, but ran into even drier conditions: '[It] became dry and there was great hunger. The Siger went away to the east to Moru Eris, where most of them died of heat and starvation. So many died that there is still a place called Kabosan ["the rotten place"]'. Bands of Turkana fighting men forced the Siger northwards to the head of Lake Turkana...Still others were pushed back onto the Suk Hills to the south to be incorporated by the Southern-Nilotic speaking Pokot...Many were assimilated by the Turkana...and the victors took possession of the grazing and water resources of Moru Assiger

— As narrated to J. Lamphear, 1988

== Pokotozek expansion ==
=== Conflict with Oropom at Baringo ===
According to the traditions recorded by Wilson, the Pokotozek incursion into Baringo disturbed Oropom who were settled around Baringo, causing a break-up of that group which led to migration in various directions. Some Oropom moved towards the Turkwel, both below and above Turkwell gorge, while others moved into Uasin Gishu Maasai held territory. Still others moved to the Chemorongit mountains which were still part of Oropom territory, as well as the area west of there and south of Mount Moroto.

Chok traditions recorded by Beech (1911) assert that the community with whom conflict occurred with at a place near Baringo was known as Sambur. The Chok were a community assimilated by the Pokotozek, their traditions state that there 'always were two original Suk tribes living on the Elgeyo Escarpment'. They further state that 'while the Suk nation was being evolved in the mountains of the Elgeyo escarpment the Kerio Valley was occupied by the Sambur.

If ever the Suk descended from their fastness they were raided by (the Sambur), until there arose a wizard among the Suk who prepared a charm in the form of a stick, which he placed in the sambur cattle kraals, with the result that their cattle all died. They thereupon left the Kerio Valley and formed a large settlement at En-ginyang (This place is about thirty miles north of Lake Baringo)...From this event dates the origin of the pastoral Suk. Hitherto they had been a purely agricultural people...

— Mervyn Beech, 1911

=== Conflict with Oropom at Cherangani and Elgon ===
The Pokotozek finding that they were no longer facing a formidable tribal grouping to the north and west of Baringo, themselves expanded in that direction, expelling other Oropom from the Cherangany mountains and further west right up to the slopes of Mt Elgon hence limiting Turkana southern movement.

Wilson notes that the newcomers to Elgon, termed the Oropom 'Sirikwa' but that at this time their density was such that they were immovable. He notes that the Oropom identity would be submerged following the Karamajong dispersion of the Oropom living at the Turkwel 'in the early eighteenth century'.

=== Establishment of the Sebei ===
At Mount Elgon, a section of the Pokotozek formed into the people today known as the Sebei. On arriving at Mt Elgon, the Sebei-Pokotozek found Tepes people who were originally from Mount Kadam in Karamoja residing at a place later known as Entepes (present-day Endebess). These Tepes of Endebess had already come under pressure from refugee Oropom who were fleeing Pokotozek/Turkana incursions in such numbers that some Tepes were forced to return to Kadam.

== Consequences for Karamajong ==
=== Conflict with Oropom at Kacheliba ===
Turpin (1948) recorded narratives in 1916 that describe conflict that occurred around 1830 between the Karamajong and a community referred to as Oropom. According to his informants, the Oropom previously occupied the region between 'Debasien (Mt Kadam), Elgon and the Suk hills'.

The Oropom owned stock and were daily harassed by us. Finally our grandparents decided it would be to our advantage to capture the Oropom and dispossess them of their country and property.
We organised a very powerful raid for this purpose and that raid broke up the Oropom, and many were captured and absorbed by our tribe. Numbers, however, escaped and fled along the northern base of Elgon towards Wamia, and some took to the Suk hills. We thereupon took possession of the Turkwel river between Elgon and the Suk hills...

— As narrated to C.A Turpin, 1916

Wilson (1970) recorded Oropom traditions from Oropom living among Karamajong communities in north-east Uganda. He states that at the time of his writing you could still distinguish previous Oropom from the Karamajong. Following a number of interviews, he was of the opinion that at the time of their collapse, the Oropom (Orupoi) were a late neolithic society whose expansive territory stretched across Turkana and the surrounding region as well as into Uganda and Sudan. He observes that the corpus of oral literature suggested that, at its tail end, the society "had become effete, after enjoying for a long period the fruits of a highly developed culture". In his account he captures details regarding the Karamajong-Oropom conflict, one he refers to as 'The Battle at Kacheliba'. Karamajong informants recounting the conflict. state the following about the Oropom and the conflict,

...Their shields were larger than ours but were ineffective as they were made of cowhide. Their spears were unlike ours, more like those of the Nandi. When we were strong enough we desired their cattle which had long horns, and we fought a great battle with them. However they were cowards and their elders had to force the young men to fight us; in doing this, they gathered them together in long lines, securing them one to the other by ropes, to prevent them running away. This was very foolish as when we killed one or two of them, the whole line collapsed with the weight of their bodies and we slaughtered them where they fell.

— As narrated to J.G, Wilson, 1970

=== Conflict with Nandi ===
According to Turpin's informant, the Karamajong "next turned their attention to the Nandi" following the battle with the Oropom. The Nandi at the time occupied the country as far north as the sources of the Nzoia River. The Karamajong raided the Nandi twice following which the Nandi retaliated by launching a big raid against the Masiniko clan of the Karamajong who were pasturing their stock at Choo hill near the junction of the Turkwel and Kanyangareng rivers. The Masiniko however counter-attacked and drove of the Nandi leading to heavy losses on the Nandi side. The Karamajong then organized a powerful raid against the Nandi but found that they had withdrawn too far south.

== Aftermath ==
A series of civil wars occurred between various Loikop factions between 1830 and 1880, they have come to be known as the Iloikop wars.

Krapf (1846) also noted that the Masai had recently "fallen out with the Wakuafi and greatly contributed to their expulsion" from the plains near Chagga. This left the Masai as the most powerful group "strolling about in the plains" where other non-Maasai sections of Iloikop had been defeated.

The Iloikop wars ended in the 1870s with the defeat and dispersal of the Laikipiak. However, the new territory acquired by the Maasai was vast and left them overextended thus unable to occupy it effectively.

== See also ==
- Second Mutai
- Kimutai, meaning "son of Mutai"
