= Mutahi =

Mutahi is a name of Kenyan origin that may refer to:

- Mutahi Kagwe (born 1958), Kenyan politician and Senator for Nyeri County
- Mikkel Mutahi Bischoff (born 1982), Danish footballer of Kenyan descent
- Sammy Alex Mutahi (born 1989), Kenyan long-distance track runner
- Wahome Mutahi (1954–2003), Kenyan humorist and playwright

== See also ==
- Mutai (name), a similar Kenyan name
