= Beading =

Beading may refer to:

- Beadwork, the art or craft of attaching beads to one another
- Molding (decorative), a strip of material to cover transitions between surfaces or for decoration
- Beading, a practice of the Samburu people
