= Samburu Project =

American non-profit organization providing clean water in Kenya

The Samburu Project (TSP) is a 501(c)(3) non-profit organization based in Los Angeles, California, founded on the promise of delivering access to clean water to the Samburu pastoralist community in northern Kenya. Since its inception, the Samburu Project has drilled 170 wells, that currently provide water to over 100,000 Samburu individuals. The organization is recognized as both a Non-Governmental Organization (NGO) and a Community Based Organization (CBO) in Kenya.

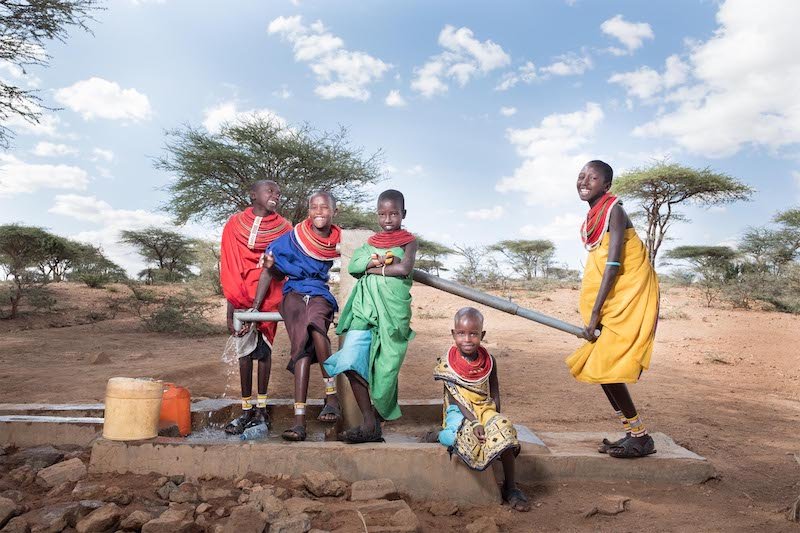
Five girls pumping water at a Lbaa Onyokie 2 Well. Copyright Mamen Saura and The Samburu Project.

== History and governing structure ==
The Samburu Project was founded in the fall of 2005 by Kristen Kosinski, a former television executive at Paramount Pictures. The organization was established following a visit to Kenya, during which Kosinski, together with Samburu elder Mama Musa, identified a need for initiatives focused on women’s empowerment in Samburu County. Kosinski served as executive director for ten years before stepping down in 2015. In February 2016, former board chair Linda Hooper became executive director, and the organization relocated its U.S. office to the Helms Bakery Complex in Culver City, California.

As of 2020, the organization has a staff of three in Los Angeles, and a staff of five at their Wamba office in Samburu county, Kenya. A diverse Board of Directors is composed of 11 individuals in the US. The organization also has an active internship program open to high school and college students.

Currently with 170 wells providing clean water, The Samburu Project has expanded its program to support women with empowerment workshops, teenage girls with menstrual hygiene products and reproductive health information, and gardening workshops as a way to expand food security, food diversity, and income generation.

The Samburu Project is supported by foundation grants, personal donations, events, peer-to-peer fundraising events, and corporate partnerships.

== Media coverage ==
The Los Angeles Times featured the work of the Samburu Project in an article by Iris Schneider in November 2016 that chronicled the daily life of a village called Ntilal. A companion article appeared in LA Observed on December 8, 2016.
