= Worr Libin =

Worr Libin was an alliance of Cushitic-speaking population groups that inhabited various regions of northern Kenya and southern Ethiopia. It has been argued that the adoption of the Borana language by the other Somaloid Worr Libin groups reflected their acceptance of a regional Boran political hegemony. This period is thought to have lasted from 1550 to 1920.

== Origins ==
Schlee proposes that prior to 1550 two pastoral societies occupied the northern and southern reaches of Kenya and Ethiopia respectively. One group comprised 'Somaloid' pastoral groups that shared a cultural complex centered on arid-land camel keeping. The other was an Eastern Cushitic speaking community, best represented by the Borana who originated in southern Ethiopia.

== c.1550 Alliance ==
The Worr Liban alliance brought together the Borana with groups derived from the Worr Dasse (i.e. culturally Somaloid but Boran-speaking).

== c.1876 Worr - Laikipiak conflict ==
=== Background ===
Following their defeat and scattering at the hands of the Maasai, a large body of the Laikipiak Maasai moved north from what is now the Laikipia district. They took the Rendille people and livestock as their spoil and divided the loot up among themselves, living briefly as parasites within this community.

When however they wanted to move the whole of Rendille society and make them follow them elsewhere, Rendille warriors who had been hiding in the bush attacked them and drove them north in a bloody battle.

=== Battle ===
Following their expulsion from Rendille, the Laikipiak moved north, raiding cattle and driving large herds along, until they were beaten by Worr Liban cavalry near Buna.

A British researcher in 1917 gave an estimated date of 1876 for the conflict and a probable location at Korondile.

== Early 20th century ==
=== Alliance break-up ===
What has been termed the Pax Borana began to break-up in the 1920s from several sources of disturbance. Most noted has been pressure exerted in Wajir and Mandera by an unintended alliance of British and Darood Somali during the period when the Pax Britannica was coming into force.
