= Laikipiak people =

Laikipiak
- (Maa-speaking, related to Kwavi people) Maa-speaking, related to Kwavi people (including those of ancestral descent)

Regions with significant populations
- Kenya

Languages
- Maa and Swahili

Religion
- Traditional beliefs and Christianity

Related ethnic groups
- Maasai people, Samburu people, Kwavi people, Uasin Gishu people
- The Laikipiak were a significant community in the 19th century, known for their conflicts with the Maasai and their eventual dispersal.

The Laikipiak Maasai are a community that inhabits the plateau located on the eastern escarpment of the Rift Valley in Kenya that today bears their name. They are said to have arisen from the scattering of the Kwavi by the Maasai in the 1830s.They were one of two significant sections of that community that stayed together. The other being the Uasin Gishu with whom they would later ally against the Maasai. Many Maa-speakers in Laikipia County today claim Laikipiak ancestry, namely those among the Ilng'wesi, Ildigirri and Ilmumonyot sub-sections of the Laikipia Maasai.

== c.1830 Origins ==
According to narratives told to Thompson in 1883, a community referred to as "Wa-kwafi"(Kwavi) fragmented following a series of misfortunes that befell them "about 1830...".

Thompson notes that the original home of the 'Wa-kwafi' was "the large district lying between Kilimanjaro, Ugono and Pare on the west, and Teita, and Usambara on the east. The Kwavi had been attacked by the Maasai while enfeebled by their 'misfortunes', the result being that the community was broken up and scattered to various corners.

The Wa-kwafi were not all scattered thus, however, for a large division of the clan kept together, and contrived to cut their way through Kikuyu and to reach Lykipia, where they settled.
Another section crossed the meridional trough and reached the opposite half of the plateau in Guas' Ngishu. In both places they found superb grazing-grounds and plenty of elbow room, and there for a time they remained quietly...

— Joseph Thompson, 1883

According to Maasai traditions recorded by MacDonald (1899), the Lykipia found Ogiek on the plateau and brought them under their patronage.

== Territory ==
According to Maasai traditions recorded by MacDonald, the territory of the Laikipiak extended over the plateau today known as Laikipia following the fragmentation of Loikop society. Chauncy Stigand made notes based on information he had 'received from Masai, Samurr, Rendile and Borana, concerning the 'old Laikipia Masai' whom he states were known as Loikop. He notes that;

...the country north of Gilgil and extending from this place to the Borana was in the old days called "Laikipia", a name which is now confined to the plateau between the north of the Aberdares and the Lorogai Mountains.
The Masai inhabitants of this tract were called "Loikop" or "the people of the country of Laikipia"...

— Stigand, C.H (1913)

== Ascendance ==
Narratives collected by Stigand in northern Kenya during the period 1877-1919, portray a period of increasing power for the 'old Laikipia Maasai' whom he calls Loikop.

As to the Loikop, they seem to have become very powerful, and their raids are alleged to have extended eastwards into Somaliland. Anyhow it is certain that they raided down to Ngong, and the Borana say that they reached as far as Dirri, east of Lake Stephanie, at which place the Borana were on the verge of falling back still further before them, when they decided to make a last effort. So collecting all available men from far and wide, and many horses, they managed to drive them back out of their country.

— Stigand, c.1919

== c.1870 Maasai - Laikipia war ==
=== Combatants ===
Thompson (1883) noted that the 'Wa-kwafi' of Guas'Ngishu and those of Lykipia, having increased in numbers and grown bold, allied together to make war on the Maasai. He was advised that this was about fifteen years before then i.e c.1870. Hollis in his account of the Maasai recorded similar narratives occurring about the same time. He notes "that about 1850 the Turkana drove the most westerly branch of the Masai from the west, to the south of (Lake Turkana)". He states that "somewhere about the same period - at the time an old man can remember according to the native expression - the Masai dwelling on the Uasin Gishu plateau attacked those of Naivasha". The Maasai of Naivasha would later ally with those of Kilimanjaro.

Berntsen (1979) notes that elders of the Purko-Kisongo Maasai relate that it was warriors of the Il Aimer age-set (c. 1870–1875) who blunted the attack of their northern neighbours the Ilaikipiak and then destroyed them as a social unit. The elders do not attribute the victory to the Maasai warriors to superior military strength but rather to the prophetic-ritual leadership of the famous laibon Mbatian who exploited his influence among several Purko-Kisongo sections to unite all the warriors of the Purko-Kisongo against the Ilaikipiak.

=== Prelude ===
According to Purko informants, the Purko and the Laikipiak allied to raid the Uasin Gishu during the warriorhood of the Il Nyankusi age-set (c. 1860s - 1870s). These traditions imply a joint or at least a coordinated attack. More recently, there has been scholarly speculation that some Purko sought charms and medicines from the prophet of the Ilaikipiak - Koikoti ole Tunai - whose kraal was located much closer to the Purko than was Mbatian's.

Following one of the Purko-Ilaikipak raids on the Uasin Gishu, the warriors of the Purko and those of the Ilaikipiak fell out over the distribution of the captured cattle. Details vary but a consistent element of the narrative claims that Kuiyoni, the speaker of the Purko warriors, instructed his warriors to take more than their share of cattle. Incensed, the Ilaikipiak warriors, guided by Koikoti, raided the Purko and the other sections around Naivasha, driving them completely from the region. A number of accounts suggest that the Ilaikipiak allied with the Uasin Gishu to exact revenge on the Purko.

The demoralized warriors and elders of the Purko then turned to their chief prophet Mbatian for aid. They appealed to him using various methods and were eventually successful in drawing him into the conflict. Mbatian directed warriors from other, uninvolved sections of the Purko-Kisongo to join the Purko and the other shattered sections to resist and destroy the Ilaikipiak.

=== Conflict ===
Many accounts of the late 19th century capture the conflict between the Maasai and the Laikipia/Uasin Gishu Kwavi alliance. They all note that this conflict ended in the subsequent annihilation of the latter.

Stigand for instance noted that the final extinction of the Laikipia arose due to conflict with the southern Maasai. His account includes reference to the Laikipia warriors jumping or being forced off a cliff which is similar to accounts later recorded in the folklore of modern Kenyan communities.

...they decided to attack and completely overwhelm the southern Masai...With this in view, they started down the Rift Valley, and as they feared being raided by their adversaries of the north whilst they were away, they brought the whole of their stock, women, children and belongings, with them.
When the southern Masai heard that they were coming, they combined together and came forth to meet them. They met the Loikop north of Nakuru (and) after a desperate encounter, the Loikop were gradually pushed backwards in a westerly direction. Not knowing the country, they were unaware that the crater of Menegai, whose wall drops sheer of the plain, was behind them.
When near the brink, the southern army redoubled the attack, and the Loikop turned suddenly to fly, and fled over the brink of the crater, those who were not killed by the enemy being precipitated to the bottom.

— Stigand, c.1919

==== Background ====
Prof. Ciarunji Chesaina (1991) wrote of conflict that occurred between "Sikyinet'ab Kaplong'ole" (the clan of long'ole district) and the Masai. The clan of long'ole are said to have lived on a 'flat-topped' mountain which was surrounded by a thick, thorny forest that was difficult to penetrate. This clan was strong, they are said to have defeated a number of neighboring clans becoming 'bonnikab bororionoto' (loosely rulers of their community). They subsequently became proud and in this air of arrogance pitted themselves against their distant rivals - the Maasai.

They are said to have goaded the Maasai to war by sending them a 'sharpening stone' with which to sharpen their spears. When the initial invitation to war was turned down, the warring Long'ole clan sent a second messenger with an even bigger sharpening stone.

==== Battle preparations ====
...the Long'ole elders prepared themselves for the big fight. Nights and days saw them sharpening their swords, spears and arrows. They also tightened their shield handles and slaughtered oxen daily and ate for strength. After a fortnight the Long'ole elders gathered all the able bodied men in preparation for imminent Maasai invasion. Some of them were assigned spying duties. Others were given horns for raising alarm. The bulk of the men formed the main regiment which surrounded the whole clan at the edges of the flat-topped mountain.

— Cherop Chemwetich, Tugen (approx. 90 years old in 1991)

==== Battle ====
One morning at dawn, (the Long'ole) were suddenly attacked by a powerful Maasai regiment which had escaped the sight of the unwary spies. They had decided to attack at night to avoid being seen by the spies. It had taken them half the night to cut through the thick thorny steep slopes of the mountain (i.e plateau). When they reached the edge of the land of the Long'ole clan, they quickly took their grounds and surrounded the clan. They briskly attacked from all sides, using their spears and swords.
The Long'ole defence force was taken aback and they frantically put up a frail, disorganised resistance. The Masai warriors easily overcame the Long'ole warriors and by sunrise they were at the center of the clan, having killed indiscriminately each and every enemy in their way.

— Cherop Chemwetich, Tugen (approx. 90 years old in 1991)

Joseph Thompson in 1883, came across a deserted village which he called Dondolè.

...Our route should have been nearly west, but it was impossible to climb the precipices. We were therefore compelled to keep almost due north, along a secondary line of fault...there were several lines of upheaval (or depression)..., being crowned by fine trees. Finally, about midday we emerged from the shattered sides of the escarpment and stood on the billowy expanse of the plateau at a height of 8400 feet. We camped shortly thereafter in a dense grove of Junipers, in which we found a deserted village of Andorobo - the hunting tribe of the Masai country. The district is called Dondolè, which I am informed, means "everybody's (that is to say - no man's land) from the incessant quarrels for possession that have taken place between the Maasai of Kinangop and the Masai (Wa-kwafi) of Lykipia.

— Joseph Thompson, 1883

== Diaspora ==
According to the narratives told to Thompson, the Kwavi were scattered and dispersed as migrants into a number of areas and communities, including;

- Taveta
- Kahe
- Mount Meru (Arusha-wa-juu)
- Among the Wazeghua
- Nderserriani
- Ngurumani

MacDonald noted that the survivors of this conflict were at that time scattered remnants in 'Nandi, Kavirondo or Ketosh'.

Johnston (1886), recognized that the Loikop were "divided into many classes, tribes and even independent nations". He grouped separately the divisions of the Masai and those of the Kwavi, noting that the later were "settled agriculturalists". The Kwavi divisions that he recognized were;

- En-jemsi and the district of Lake Baringo
- Laikipia
- Kosova
- Lumbwa (near Kavirondo)
- Aruša
- Méru (near Kilimanjaro)
- Ruvu river
- Nguru (south)

Straight et al. note that the Samburu by way of several landscape features, "understand their relationship to ancestors both victorious and assimilated". Of the Laikipia, they state - "...And when the Laikipiak were finished [wiped out] they went to other sub-clans and other ethnic groups made them their own. So the Laikipiak did not finish, they are still among many people...And they are also among us Lmasula [a Samburu section]".

Another Samburu elder of Laikipia heritage, asked rhetorically; Is there anywhere that there aren't Laikipiak?

No! "They Splashed"

Many Maa-speakers in Laikipia County, namely among the Ilng'wesi, Ildigirri and Ilmumonyot claim to be descendants of Ilaikipiak today (although most identify primarily as Maasai). Oral historical records suggested that these groups scattered into the forests of Mt Kenya and elsewhere following the defeat of the Laikipiak, where they subsisted through hunting and foraging until rebuilding their herds off the back of the ivory trade, as well as livestock theft. This period led to their stigmatisation by Samburu and other neighbouring groups as 'Dorobo'.
