= Maliri people =

The Maliri were a people, recalled by various communities in Kenya and Uganda today, that inhabited regions on the north east of and north west borders of Uganda and Kenya respectively and later spread to regions in southern Ethiopia.

== Sources ==
The primary source for information on the Maliri is an article by J.G. Wilson, published in 1970 in The Journal of the Uganda Society, titled Preliminary Observations on the Oropom People of Karamoja, Their Ethnic Status, Culture and Postulated Relation to the Peoples of the Late Stone Age. Although the article focuses mainly on the Oropom, it contains the most extensive published account of a Kalenjin-speaking group known as the Maliri. Wilson presents the Maliri as a distinct people who formerly inhabited parts of Karamoja and northwestern Kenya before being displaced by the Turkana and Karimojong.

Wilson was a long-term resident of Karamoja, first arriving in 1952 and residing there until 1959, with a subsequent return in 1962. His prolonged engagement with the region allowed him to collect oral histories and local traditions from various communities, including the Jie, Karimojong, and Turkana, some of whom retained memory of the Maliri and their dispersal. He also developed a strong interest in archaeology and paleontology, which informed his broader theories about early settlement patterns and cultural transitions in the region.

Although Wilson's article draws heavily on oral traditions he gathered in the 1950s and 1960s, he also incorporates material from earlier sources, as reflected in the references cited throughout his study.

== Origins ==
The Maliri are thought to have settled in what are now Jie country and large parts of Dodoth country in Uganda. Their arrival in the districts is estimated at 600 to 800 years ago (i.e. c.1200 to 1400 AD)

== Society ==
=== Occupation ===
The Maliri followed a pastoral way of life. It is unclear whether they practiced any form of cultivation.

=== Language ===
The Maliri spoke a Kalenjin language

== Decline ==
=== Karimojong Incursions ===
Oral traditions indicate that the expansion of Lwoo speakers into Acholi caused the breakaway of a group of Karimojong who were initially known as Jie. The Jie came from the vicinity of Gulu though there was a section of the group who came from a hill known as Got Turkan. The Jie who are said to have been Luo speaking though governed by elders and not chiefs (indicating that their culture was not fully Lwoo-ised), advanced eastward and entered the present Karamoja boundary at Adilang. The territory they entered was then occupied by the Maliri who were pushed to the vicinity of Koten mountains.

The Jie from Got Turkan, now calling themselves Turkana, broke away from the main Jie populace at Kotido and advanced eastward bringing extreme pressure to bear on the Maliri at Koten causing that group to split into two. One section came to be known as Merille while the other referred to themselves as Pokotozek.

== Fragmentation ==
=== Merille ===
The Merille who as late as 1970 were still known to the Karimojong as Maliri moved further eastward from their rest point at Koten, settling somewhere east of the Turkana escarpment. Here they again had encounters with the Turkana causing them to move further northward and eastward towards present day Lake Turkana where they settled at Lokitaung. Here again the Turkana harried them and pushed them into their present homeland and what may have been their original cradle-land in the Omo Valley in southern Ethiopia.

=== Pokotozek ===
The Pokotozek moved south, arriving at Nakiloro which lies on the lip of the Turkana escarpment just north of Moroto mountain, where they stayed for a short while before moving further south, proceeding down the eastern side of the Chemorongit and Cherangani mountains before finally branching off in the direction of Lake Baringo.

This Pokot incursion disturbed Oropom who were settled around Baringo, causing a break-up of that group which led to migrations in various directions;

Turkwell, some Oropom moved towards the Turkwell, both below and above Turkwell gorge.

Uasin Gishu; other moved into Uasin Gishu Maasai held territory

Oropom; some moved to the Chemorongit mountains which were still part of Oropom territory, as well as the area west of there and south of Moroto mountain

The Pokotozek finding that they were no longer facing a formidable tribal grouping to the north and west of Baringo, themselves expanded in that direction, expelling other Oropom from the Cherangani mountains and further west right up to the slopes of Mt Elgon hence limiting Turkana southern movement.

=== Sebei ===
At Mt Elgon, a section of the Pokotozek formed into the people today known as the Sebei. On arriving at Mt Elgon, the Sebei-Pokotozek found Tepes people who were originally from Kadam mountain in Karamoja residing at a place later known as Entepes (today Endebess). These Tepes had already come under pressure from Oropom who were fleeing Pokotozek/Turkana incursions in such numbers that some Tepes were forced to return to Kadam.

It is notable that the emerging Sebei referred to the Mt Elgon Oropom as Sirikwa. The Sirikwa population at Mt Elgon, as evidenced by Sirkwa holes, was fairly dense and it is likely that their identity was still largely intact. It would take the Karimojong dispersion of the Oropom at Kapcheliba in the early 18th century to finally submerge the Oropom-Sirikwa identity.

== Becoming Pokot ==
The Pokotozek defeated the Loikop at Baringo, following which a settlement was established at En-ginyang (about 48 kilometers north of Lake Baringo). This event signified the establishment of the pastoral Chok, i.e. Pokot, community.

Pokot traditions recall that the victory came when "... there arose a wizard among the Suk who prepared a charm in the form of a stick, which he placed in the Loikop cattle kraals, with the result that they all died."

Once the Pokotozek breached the Loikop boundary thus gaining access to the Kerio valley, a desire arose many Chok to adopt pastoralist culture. The aim and ambition of every agricultural Chok became to amass enough cattle to move into the Kerio Valley and join their pastoral kin. They achieved this through attaining cattle as the bride-price of their female relations or through adoption, in the latter case, poor Chok youth would be adopted by members of the emerging Pokot community primarily as herds-boys.

By the early 20th century, the Pokot community was expanding as many of the Chok joined their rank and by that time, many Pokot who were termed Suk by the colonial administrators did not recognize this name for their tribe.

== See also ==
- Marille people
- Murle people
