= Mbatian =

African ritual leader

Mbatian (died 1890) was a Maasai laibon known for prophecies that he made and consequent victories by Maasai warriors that were attributed to him.

== Early life ==
Mbatian was born to the Maasai laibon Supeet and he succeeded him as laibon.

== Maasai - Laikipia war ==
Berntsen (1979) notes that elders of the Purko-Kisongo Maasai relate that it was warriors of the Il Aimer age-set (c. 1870-1875) who blunted the attack of their northern neighbours the Ilaikipiak and then destroyed them as a social unit. The elders do not attribute the victory of the Maasai warriors to superior military strength but rather to the prophetic-ritual leadership of the famous laibon Mbatian who exploited his influence among several Purko-Kisongo sections to unite all the warriors of the Purko-Kisongo against the Ilaikipiak.

According to Purko informants, the Purko and the Ilaikipiak allied to raid the Uasin Gishu during the warriorhood of the Il Nyankusi age-set (c. 1860s - 1870s). These traditions imply a joint or at least a coordinated attack. More recently, there has been scholarly speculation that some Purko sought charms and medicines from the prophet of the Ilaikipiak - Koikoti ole Tunai - whose kraal was located much closer to the Purko than was Mbatian's.

Following one of the Purko-Ilaikipak raids on the Uasin Gishu, the warriors of the Purko and those of the Ilaikipiak fell out over the distribution of the captured cattle. Details vary but a consistent element of the narrative claims that Kuiyoni, the speaker of the Purko warriors, instructed his warriors to take more than their share of cattle. Incensed, the Ilaikipiak warriors, guided by Koikoti, raided the Purko and the other sections around Naivasha, driving them completely from the region. A number of accounts suggest that the Ilaikipiak allied with the Uasin Gishu to exact revenge on the Purko.

The demoralized warriors and elders of the Purko then turned to Mbatian for aid. They appealed to him using various methods and were eventually successful in drawing him into the conflict. Mbatian directed warriors from other, uninvolved sections of the Purko-Kisongo to join the Purko and the other shattered sections to resist and destroy the Ilaikipiak.

Many accounts of the late 19th century capture the conflict between the Maasai and the Laikipia/Uasin Gishu Kwavi alliance. They all note that this conflict ended in the subsequent annihilation of the latter. Stigand for instance noted that the final extinction of the Laikipia arose due to conflict with the southern Maasai.

== Succession ==
A number of factors determined the selection of a laibon's successor and it would seem that one of the most influential of these factors was the age-set whose time it was at the time of the laibon's death. In that, the sons belonging to the age-set whose time it was usually stood a greater chance of succeeding their father as opposed to those whose time had passed or was yet to come.

The time of Mbatian's death in 1890, was the time of the Il Talala, who had been initiated in 1882. This was the age-set of two of Mbatian's sons, Senteu and his rival half-brother Lenana. Of the two, Mbatian had indicated a preference for the former by having invited Senteu to join him in preparing medicines and prophecies for the age-set ceremony of 1882.

It is noted that when Mbatian was on the point of death, he called the elders of the Matapato, the district where he resided and among other prophesies, told them that he wished his successor to be the son to whom he would give the medicine man's insignia. He is then reputed to have called his eldest son Sendenyo (also known as Senteu) and said to him "Come tomorrow morning for I wish to give you the medicine man's insignia".

Lenana, who had hidden himself in the calf-shed, overheard the conversation. He rose early the next morning and went to his father's hut whereupon he said "Father, I have come". Mbatian was very old by this time and had only one good eye. He therefore did not see which of his sons was before him and so he gave to Lenana the medicine man's insignia (the iron club and the medicine horn, the gourd, the stones and the bag) at the same time saying "Thou shalt be great amongst thy brothers and amongst all the people". Lenana took the insignia and went away.

When Sendenyo went to his father, he was told that his brother had already been there and had taken the medicine man's insignia. He was angered and said "I will not be subject to my brother; I will fight him till I kill him".

Mbatian died and was buried near Donyo Erok.

Following Mbatian's death, factions formed around his two sons and civil war broke out. Soon after, disease broke out amongst Sendenyo's people, many of whom died, their cattle all perished and they were defeated by the Germans. Conversely, Lenana's people did not fall ill and they were successful in their raids and thus obtained cattle. Sendenyo eventually came to his brother Lenana in 1902 and begged that he be allowed to live with Lenana and peace was thus concluded between the two parties.

== Legacy ==
Batian Peak, the highest peak of Mount Kenya (5,199 metres or 17,057 feet) and highest point in Kenya
