= Mutai (name) =

Mutai is a surname of Kenyan origin. A multilingual name, it is found among the kalenjin, meru, kikuyu with an additional letter "h". It may refer to:

- Abel Mutai (born 1988), Kenyan steeplechase runner and 2012 Olympic medallist
- Emmanuel Kipchirchir Mutai (born 1984), Kenyan marathon runner and 2011 London Marathon winner
- Geoffrey Mutai (born 1981), Kenyan marathon runner, winner of the Boston Marathon and New York Marathon
- Mark Mutai (born 1978), Kenyan 400 metres sprinter and 2010 Commonwealth Games champion
- Shunsuke Mutai (born 1956), Japanese politician of the Liberal Democratic Party

== See also ==
- Kimutai, meaning "son of Mutai"
- Kinamutay, subtype of Filipino martial arts
