= Enganglima people =

Ethnic group from Kenya and Tanzania

Enganglima
- (Possibly Nilotic) Possibly Nilotic (including those of ancestral descent)

Regions with significant populations
- Kenya, Tanzania

Languages
- Possibly Maa and Swahili

Religion
- Traditional beliefs and Christianity

Related ethnic groups
- Maasai people, Kwavi people, Wakuafi people
- The Enganglima were historically dominant in the plains of Kenya and Tanzania but were displaced by the Maasai in the early 19th century.

The Enganglima were a community that occupied and were said to dominate the southern and northern plains of present-day Kenya and Tanzania respectively. They were pushed out of their territory in the early 19th century by the Maasai.

== Sources ==
Ludwig Krapf recorded accounts of the Engánglima from Lemāsěgnǒt whose father was "Engobore, an Mkuafi of the tribe Engánglima" who had "married a woman in the Interior near Oldoinio eibŏr (white mountain)" by whom he got his son, Lemāsěgnǒt. Krapf notes that Engobore resolved to reside at a place called Muasuni which was situated on the upper course of the Pangani river in the vicinity of the kingdom of Usambara when he returned from the interior. Krapf states that "the reason which had induced Engobore to join the nomadic settlement of the Wakuafi tribe Barrabuyu...was because his own tribe Engánglima had during his stay in the interior been nearly annihilated by the wild Masai".

== Territory ==
Krapf noted that the Enganglima territory;

...occupied the vast territory situated between Usambara, Teita and Ukambani...

— Ludwig Krapf, 1854

Thompson wrote of the 'Wa-kwafi' and their territory which by his description is roughly contiguous with Engánglima territory as mentioned by Krapf. Thompson states that;

The original home of the (Wa-kwafi) was the large district lying between Kilimanjaro, Ugono and Parè on the west, and Teita and U-sambara on the east. This large region is known to the Masai as Mbaravui.

— Thompson, 1883

Furthermore, Maasai sources identify the Enganglima as speakers of a Maa language.

== Peoples ==
Krapf's account of his informant alludes to a corporate identity that he refers to as 'Wakuafi' which had within it at least two sections, that he refers to as Engánglima and Barrabuyu.

== Conflict ==
Krapf wrote about conflicts that affected the 'Engánglima' tribe. He notes that they;

...first received a mortal blow from their brethren the Masai, and afterwards from the united forces of the Wakamba, Wanika, Wasuahili and Wateita (and) in consequence of this disastrous catastrophe either disappeared, or retreated to the territory of other Wakuafi in order to escape utter destruction...

— Ludwig Krapf, 1854

According to Thompson's account, a 'series of misfortunes' fell upon the Kwavi about 1830 leading to the eventual collapse of the community. He states that;

In a great war-raid against the Wa-gogo to the south they suffered a severe repulse, and great numbers were slaughtered. The same disaster fell upon them shortly after, in a raid against their brethren of Kisongo...While the Wa-kwafi were in this unhappy plight, the Masai of the plains to the west fell upon them and smote them hip and thigh, and thus broke up and revenged themselves upon the most powerful division of the tribe...

— Thompson, 1883

== Diaspora ==
According to Thompson's narrative, the Kwavi were not entirely annihilated 'for a large division of the clan kept together, and contrived to cut their way through Kikuyu and to reach Lyikipia where they settled. Another section crossed the meridional trough and reached the opposite half of the plateau in Guas' Ngishu'.

In both districts, they found superb grazing-grounds and plenty of elbow-room, and there for a time they remained quietly, and increased rapidly in numbers.

— Joseph Thompson

According to his account these conflicts formed part of the Iloikop wars.
