= Ciarunji Chesaina =

Kenyan folklorist, professor, and diplomat (born 1947)

- Born: Jane Ciarunji Geteria; 1947 (age 78–79); Kenya
- Education: Alliance Girls High School Makerere University (BA, 1971); Harvard University (M.Ed) University of Leeds (PhD, 1988)
- Occupations: folklorist, professor, diplomat
- Years active: 1970s–present
- Employer: University of Nairobi
- Known for: African oral literature, folklore studies, women's literature
- Notable work: Oral Literature of the Kalenjin (1991) Perspectives on Women in African Literature (1994) Run Gazelle Run (2018)
- Office: High Commissioner of Kenya to South Africa (2000–2003)

Ciarunji Chesaina (born 1947) is a Kenyan folklorist, professor, and diplomat. She is best known for her work studying the history, ethnography, and folklore of peoples across Africa, particularly among the Nilotic and Bantu groups. She also represented Kenya as the high commissioner to South Africa from 2000 to 2003.

== Biography ==
Ciarunji Chesaina was born Jane Ciarunji Geteria in 1947. She attended Alliance Girls High School in Kikuyu, Kenya. Chesaina graduated from Uganda's Makerere University with a bachelor's degree in French and English in 1971. She subsequently studied in the United States, where she received a master's in education from Harvard University, and in the United Kingdom, where she obtained a Ph.D. in literature from the University of Leeds in 1988.

Chesaina lectured at Kenyatta University beginning in the 1970s, then joined the faculty of the University of Nairobi in 1991. She teaches literature, particularly African literature, women's literature, and oral literature.

Since the 1970s, she has been influential in helping engrain Kenyan literature in the nation's education system. As a folklorist, she has contributed significantly to the study of various African ethnic groups, in particular the Kalenjin people and Embu people. She has also advocated in favor of compensating oral history research subjects for their participation.

Chesaina temporarily left her post at the University of Nairobi for three years, from 2000 to 2003, to serve as Kenya's high commissioner to South Africa.

In 2018, she published an autobiography titled Run Gazelle Run.

== Selected works ==
- Oral Literature of the Kalenjin (1991)
- Perspectives on Women in African Literature (1994)
- Hope on the Horizon: Essays on the Status and Liberation of African Women (1994)
- Pokot (1996)
- Oral Literature of the Embu and Mbeere (1997)
- Teaching of African Literature in the 21st Century (editor, 2009)
- The Significance of Oral Literature in Children's Development: Social & Psychological Issues (2009)
- Run Gazelle Run: An Autobiography (2018)
