= Kwavi people =

Ethnic group

Kwavi
- (Bantu, Nilotic) Bantu, Nilotic (including those of ancestral descent)

Regions with significant populations
- Kenya, Tanzania

Languages
- Possibly Loikop or a dialect of Maa and Swahili

Religion
- Traditional beliefs and Christianity

Related ethnic groups
- Maasai people, Laikipiak people, Uasin Gishu people, Enganglima people, Kamba people, Galla people
- Notable conflicts include the Iloikop wars and raids against neighboring communities.

The Kwavi people were a community commonly spoken of in the folklore of a number of Kenyan and Tanzanian communities that inhabited regions of south-central Kenya and north-central Tanzania at various points in history. The conflicts between the Uasin Gishu/Masai and Kwavi form much of the literature of what are now known as the Iloikop wars.

== Etymology ==
Krapf's (1854) account on the Kwavi was the earliest and for a long time influenced accounts about the Kwavi community. On their name, he states;

The name, Wakŭáfi (or Waquafi) which is only used by the Suahilis and other tribes residing near the sea-coast, is very likely a corruption of the term by which they call themselves, viz. Loikǒb or Eloikob (sing. oloikǒban or oloikobani, a Mkuafi, plur. Loikob or Eloikob, the Wakuafi) - a term which the Wakamba of the interior have changed into Mukábi, in the singular and Akábi in the plural, mukafi a term used by the Kikuyus.

— Ludwig Krapf, 1854

Later writers, writing a few decades later by which point the community had collapsed seemed to indicate that Krapf's designation was not quite accurate. None provided an alternative however. Johnston writing in 1886 for instance, noted that "'Kwavi' is supposed to be a corrupted version of 'El-oigob'"(i.e. Loikop). He also noted that the term Loikop at the time implied settled residence. In another account (1902) he states "...'Kwavi', a name that no Masai can recognise or explain, but which has been perpetuated owing to its adoption by Krapf".

== Origins ==
Krapf (1860) recorded a reference to the Kwavi in Wanyika mythology. According to the myth, 'the Galla, Wakamba and Wakuafi had one common father whose eldest son was called Galla'. Galla is said to have raided another community's cattle upon which his brothers Mkamba and Mkuafi asked for a share of the booty but were refused by their brother Galla. Mkuafi is said to have then raided Galla following which he in turn was robbed by his brother Mkamba and vice versa. From that time arose deadly enmity between the brothers which has had no end.

== History ==
Writing in 1854, Krapf portrays a previously powerful community that was under significant Maasai pressure, accounts from later writers would show that the Kwavi community was collapsing under Maasai attacks at the time Krapf was writing about them. Krapf notes that the Kwavi had previously been "the terror of the agricultural tribes of Jagga, Ukamabani, Teita, Usambara and on the sea-coast".

=== c.1830 misfortunes ===
Thomson, on his journey through Masai land in 1883, wrote of a series of misfortunes that befell and seriously enfeebled the Kwavi people.

About 1830 - as far as I can gather - a series of misfortunes fell upon them. In a great war raid against the Wa-gogo to the south, they suffered a severe repulse, and great numbers were slaughtered. The same disaster fell upon them in a raid against their brethren of Kisongo. The saying that misfortunes never come singly was well exemplified by their case, for nature took up the work of ruin. A cloud of locusts settled on the land, and left not a blade of grass or other green thing, so that the cattle died in enormous numbers through starvation.

— Joseph Thomson, 1883

The 'Kisongo' referred to here by Thomson being the Wa-hehe, who according to Johnston (1902), "had been virilised by a slight intermixture of Zulu blood".

=== Maasai - Kwavi war ===
While the Wa-kwafi were in this unhappy plight, the Masai of the plains to the west fell upon them and smote them hip and thigh, and thus broke up and revenged themselves upon the most powerful division of the tribe.

— Joseph Thomson, 1883

== Territory ==
Krapf (1854) recorded that;

...the main strength of the Wakuafi is concentrated around the Oldoinio eibor in a country called Kaputei, whence (they) proceed to the North, North-East, West and South...

— Ludwig Krapf, 1854

Krapf states further on that "regarding Oldoinio eibor it is necessary to remark that by this term is meant the Kirénia or Endurkenia, or simply Kenia, as the Wakamba call it..."

== Peoples ==
Ludwig Krapf (1854) recorded accounts of the Engánglima from Lemāsěgnǒt whose father was "Engobore, an Mkuafi of the tribe Engánglima" who had "married a woman in the Interior near Oldoinio eibŏr (white mountain)" by whom he got his son, Lemāsěgnǒt. Krapf notes that Engobore resolved to reside at a place called Muasuni which was situated on the upper course of the Pangani river in the vicinity of the kingdom of Usambara when he returned from the interior. Krapf states that "the reason which had induced Engobore to join the nomadic settlement of the Wakuafi tribe Barrabuyu...was because his own tribe Engánglima had during his stay in the interior been nearly annihilated by the wild Masai". His account of his informant alludes to a corporate identity that he refers to as 'Wakuafi' which had within it at least two sections, that he refers to as Engánglima and Barrabuyu.

=== Enganglima ===
Krapf noted that the Enganglima territory;

...occupied the vast territory situated between Usambara, Teita and Ukambani...

— Ludwig Krapf, 1854

Joseph Thomson wrote of the 'Wa-kwafi' and their territory which by his description is roughly contiguous with Engánglima territory as recorded by Krapf. Thomson stated that;

The original home of the (Wa-kwafi) was the large district lying between Kilimanjaro, Ugono and Parè on the west, and Teita and U-sambara on the east. This large region is known to the Masai as Mbaravui.

— Thomson, 1883

== Way of life ==
Writing in the mid-19 century, Krapf detailed a way of life that he noted was common to the 'Wakuafi' and the 'Masai'.

=== Residence ===
When the Kwavi and Masai settled at a place for a period of time, they built a large town known as Orlmamara. A smaller town was known as Engany, and a settlement that promised to be important and was large was styled Enganassa. These settlements consisted of huts, covered with cow-hide or grass and were surrounded by thorn hedges and ditches for protection against enemy attack.

=== Subsistence ===
Krapf noted that the Kwavi were nomadic, settling for months at a time when they found pasture and water. They lived entirely on milk, butter, honey and the meat of black cattle, goats, sheep, and game. The Kwavi supplemented their herds by raiding other communities for cattle based on a mythological belief that all cattle on earth belonged to them (and Masai) by divine gift. A notable food belief held by the Kwavi was that nourishment provided by cereals enfeebles and was thus only suited to the tribes of the mountains in their territories. The opposite was held to be true, that a diet of meat and milk gives strength and courage and were thus the only proper food for the Kwavi.

=== Warfare ===
The weapons of the Kwavi and Maasai consisted of a spear, a large oblong shield, and a club that was round and thick at the top. The latter was used with great precision and to devastating effect at a distance of fifty to seventy paces and it was this weapon above all that struck fear in East African communities, 'the Suahili with their muskets not excepted'.

The fighting force was composed of all Kwavi men roughly between the ages of twenty and twenty five. They were known as Elmoran.

== Diaspora ==
Thomson in his account notes that the Kwavi were "not all scattered" following their defeat at the hands of the Maasai. He notes that two large divisions of the Kwavi kept together, one cutting through Kikuyu and settling in 'Lykipia' while the other crossed the Rift to settle in Uasin Gishu. He further records that "In both districts they found superb grazing-grounds and plenty of elbow-room, and there for a time they remained quietly, and increased rapidly in numbers".

- Laikipiak people
- Uasin Gishu people
