= Parakuyo people =

The Parakuyo people, are a community of about thirty thousand pastoralists who live scattered across Tanzania today. They are the principal speakers of the Kwavi language.

== Etymology ==
Members of the community refer to themselves as Parakuyo when speaking to each other. When interacting with unfamiliar outsiders they will almost always identify themselves as Maasai. Maasai people and other East Africans often refer to the Parakuyo as Kwavi, Loikop or Lumbwa, a practice that Parakuyo do not appreciate.

== About ==
The Kwavi are related to the Maasai. Though little has been written about them, they were the subject of a 1974 Master's thesis at the University of Dar es Salaam by Douglas Ndagala, "Social and Economic Change among the Pastoral Wakwavi and Its Impact on Rural Development." At least one author, however, denies their existence as a distinct ethnic group, while another research paper gives the names Ilparakuyo and Baraguyu as apparent synonyms for Kwavi.

The Kwavi basically refers to a cultural or occupational group. This term is also used in Kenya and it is used to refer to groups of people related to the Akamba people. Even the Kwavi of Tanzania are not a separate ethnic group per se, but a people within an ethnic group who have a particular occupation. The Wakwavi are a sedentary people with a heavy bias to pastoralism, but also elements of agriculture. As such, they has been looked upon as being Gogo people, with whom they shared the same language.

With time, due to loss of livestock and consequential pauperism, many have changed their preoccupation to agriculturalism, and as such are now not discernible from the other Gogo people. They were mistaken as Masaai, whom they were not, for although they had Masaai features of dressing, they had not their ornament, they did not use ochre as the Masaai, nor did plait their hair long like the Masaai. And although the blanket featured just as the Masaai, their nakedness was not exposed as the Masaai. However, unlike other Gogos, they pierced and elongated their earlobes, this though is not limited to the Masaai.

The Kwavi being part of the Gogo group is an indication of the emergence of the Gogo people, which is not a tribe but a Nation. The Gogo is a modern agglomerate group, the different sections being brought together by the great leader Mazengo. This gave rise to the Gogo people around Mpwapwa, made up of such elements as Wakaguru who are characterised as being agriculturist, the Gogo of Western Gogoland who are more like their western neighbours the Konongo, and the southern Gogos, who are a mixture of the agro-pastoralist Wasangu and agriculturist Hehe.

The Wakwavi origins have been attributed to conflicting sources. Most people claimed that they were of Masaai influence, namely referring to Parakuo Masaai influence, another theory points to a common origin with the Hadzabe and even Nyaturu.

An alternate view is that the term Wakwavi (or Kwafi) is a Swahili corruption of the Maa iloonkuapi (‘people of other lands’). Among Maasai, this is a relative term for other Maasai-speaking groups or sections who are not close allies: if section A regard section B as iloonkuapi, then B may apply the same term to A, implying mutual mistrust. The confusion appears to stem from an early work by the coastal missionary Ludwig Krapf, whose Maasai informant wished to distance himself from those Maasai who were responsible for raids on the Swahili coast. He described them as iloonkuapi, and Krapf assumed that they were other Maa-speaking peoples who were deadly enemies of the Maasai proper, regarding iloonkuapi as an absolute term rather than a reciprocal one. Subsequent visitors to the area followed Krapf’s account and the name Wakwavi became established, randomly applied to ethnic groups who were neighbours of the Maasai proper and shared their culture up to a point.
