= Kinamutay =

Cebuano subsection of "dirty" martial arts

Kinamutay /ˌkiːnəˈmuːtaɪ/ (Cebuano: kinamutay, lit. "effeminate hand fighting"; Tagalog: kinamotay; Baybayin: ᜃᜒᜈᜋᜓᜆᜌ᜔), commonly but incorrectly orientalized kino mutai, is a specialized subsection of some martial arts that emphasizes biting, pinching, eye-gouging, and other forms of "dirty" fighting techniques. Kinamutay involves extensive use of grappling and manipulation of nerve and pressure points, so as to allow the kinamutay practitioner to inflict pain and control the opponent while applying the techniques. Although in Cebu it is culturally associated with women's catfighting, the techniques used are effective against opponents of all sizes.

The root word of the term is Cebuano kinamut, "using the hands" (such as in eating food), from kamut, "hand" (and compare related Tagalog kamot, "to scratch"), with the feminizing suffix -ay. Formalization of kinamutay as a martial art is a Western tradition not founded in Filipino martial arts or culture, where the term has little difference in meaning from "catfight". It was popularized in the magazine Black Belt in the late 1980s, especially by martial artist Paul Vunak; it is also associated with Jeet Kune Do.

One key principle is uninterrupted biting: This means that the kinamutay practitioner places himself in such a position that he can continue to hold a bite as long as he wants, disabling his opponent from escaping his bite. The biting aspect of kinamutay concerns itself with what targets to bite, how much to bite at a time, and the angle and movement of the bite. Favored targets include sensitive and easily accessible areas such as the face, neck, ear, groin, nipple, and latissimus dorsi muscle. These targets are also chosen over others because of the difficulty countering a kinamutay practitioner biting them, ensuring an uninterrupted bite can take place. It can be used to inflict pain and can be used to cut arteries which can cause severe bleeding.

== See also ==
- Maharlika
- Timawa
- Juramentado
- Filipino Martial Arts
- Eskrima
- Suntukan
- Dumog
- Sikaran
- Kuntaw
