= Samburu people =

Nilotic people of north-central Kenya

Samburu
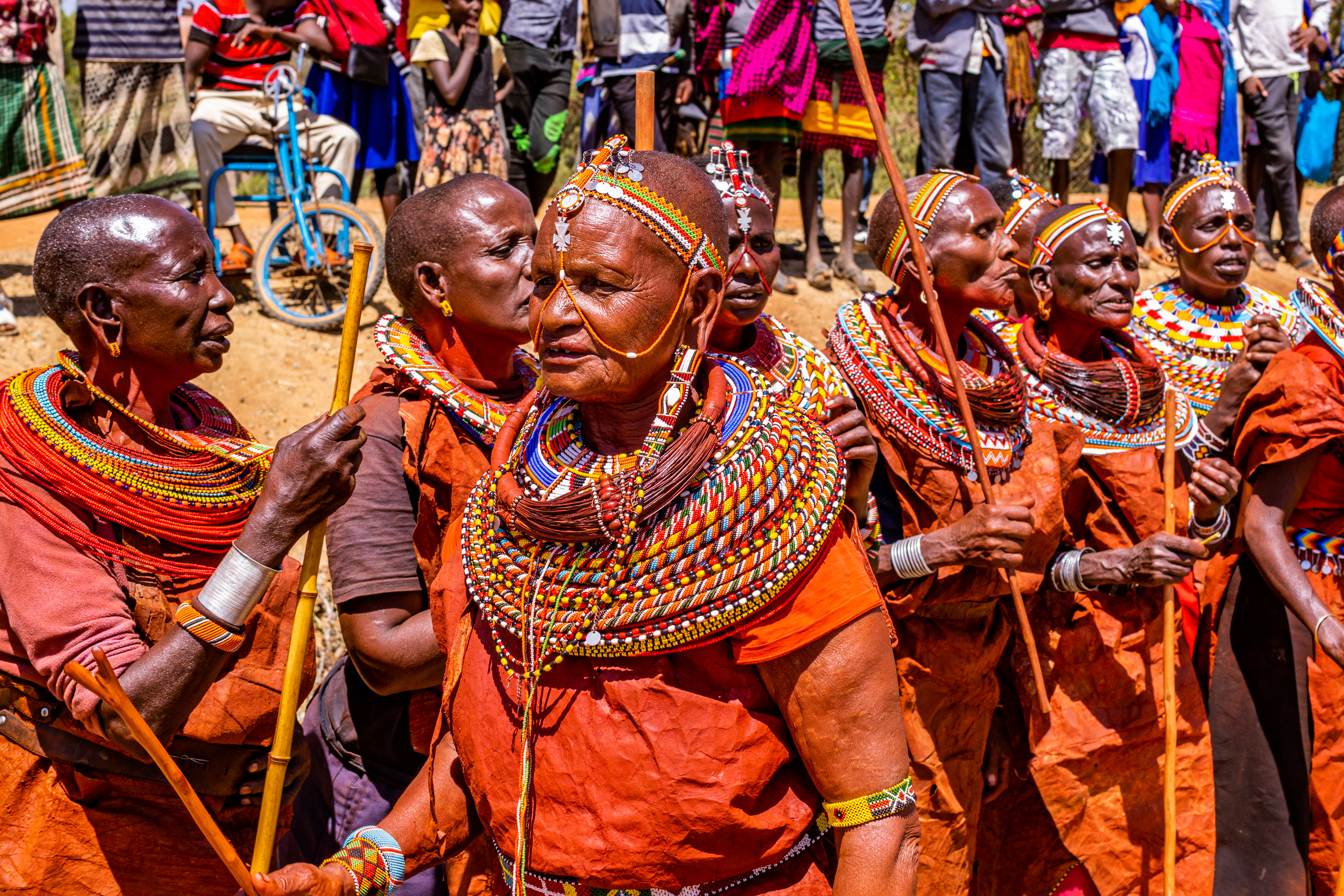

Total population
- 333,471

Regions with significant populations
- Samburu county (Kenya)

Languages
- Samburu, Swahili, English

Religion
- Christianity, Traditional beliefs

Related ethnic groups
- Other Nilotic peoples

The Samburu are a Nilotic people of north-central Kenya. Traditionally, they are semi-nomadic pastoralists who primarily herd cattle but also keep sheep, goats and camels. They refer to themselves as Lokop or Loikop, a term with varied interpretations among the Samburu. Some believe it means "owners of the land" ("lo" meaning ownership and "nkop" meaning land) while others have different interpretations.

The Samburu speak the Samburu dialect of the Maa language, a Nilotic language which is also spoken by 22 other sub tribes of the Maa community commonly known as the Maasai. Some suggest that the Samburu are a distinct tribe separate from the Maasai, but this is not accepted by most Samburu as many refer to themselves and the Maasai collectively as Maa and celebrate their general shared culture and achievements.

Samburu National Reserve is one of the well known wildlife conservation areas in Kenya. Within the Maa community of Kenya and Tanzania, the Samburu sub-tribe is the third largest, following the Kisonko (Isikirari) of Tanzania and Purko of Kenya and Tanzania.

== History ==
Woto (sometimes Otto, *Do, To and Do) is a location which Samburu consider to be their homeland. Woto means north in Samburu. The exact location is unknown. It has generally been identified as being north of Lake Turkana and has been postulated to be somewhere in southern Ethiopia.

=== Cultural connections ===
The Nandi have a tradition that the first man who practiced circumcision in Nandi is said to have been one Kipkenyo who came from a country called Do (in other accounts To, indicating the intervocalic Kalenjin *d sound – closest pronunciation Tto).

The story goes that Kipkenyo had a number of brothers and sisters who all died when they reached puberty, so Kipkenyo decided when he had a number of children of his own to 'change' them all at this age. He therefore circumcised them, and as none of his children died, the Nandi followed his example, with the result that circumcision became general.

— Hollis, A. C., The Nandi - Their Language and Folklore, 1909

This corresponds with linguistic studies which indicate significant cultural transfer between Southern Nilotes and Eastern Cushites during a time of intensive interaction prior to Southern Nilotic settlement in western Kenya.

== Culture ==
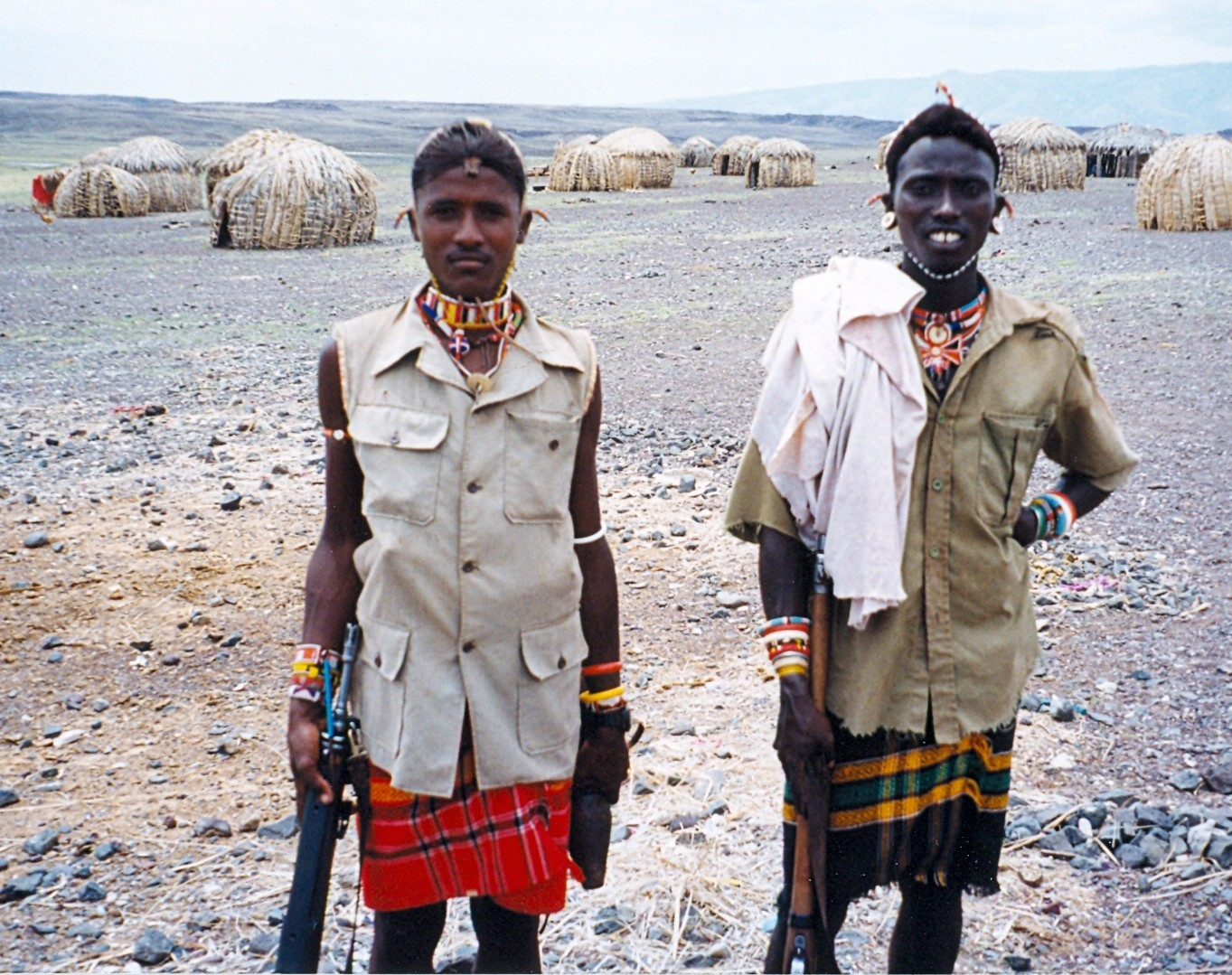
Samburu warriors near Lake Turkana in 1999.

=== Social organization ===
The Samburu are a gerontocracy. The power of elders is linked to the belief in their curse, underpinning their monopoly over arranging marriages and taking on further wives. This is at the expense of unmarried younger men, whose development up to the age of thirty is in a state of social suspension, prolonging their adolescent status.

=== Clothing ===
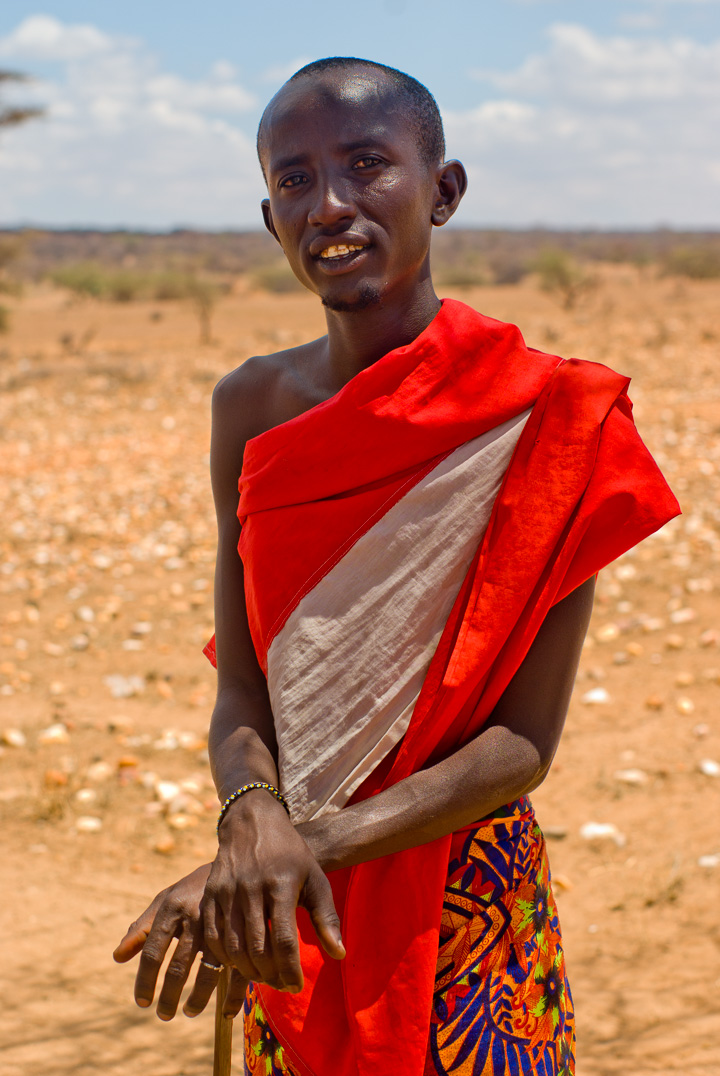
Samburu chief

Traditionally, Samburu men wore a cloth which was often pink or black and is wrapped around their waist. They adorned themselves with necklaces, bracelets and anklets, like other sub tribes of the Maasai community. Members of the moran age grade (i.e. "warriors") typically wore their hair in long braids, which they shaved off when they became elders. It may have been colored using red ochre. Their bodies were sometimes decorated with ochre, as well. Women wore two pieces of blue or purple cloth, one piece wrapped around the waist, the second wrapped over the chest. Women kept their hair shaved and wear numerous necklaces and bracelets. Since the 2000s, clothing styles have changed. Beadwork continues to be prominent in both warrior and women's attire. Some men may wear red tartan cloth or they may wear a dark green/blue plaid cloth around their waists called 'kikoi', often with shorts underneath. Marani (Lmuran) (warriors) wear a cloth that may be floral or pastel. Some women still wear two pieces of blue or red cloth, but it has become fashionable to wear cloths with animal or floral patterns in deep colors. Women may also often wear small tank tops with their cloths, and plaid skirts have also become common.

=== Food and society ===
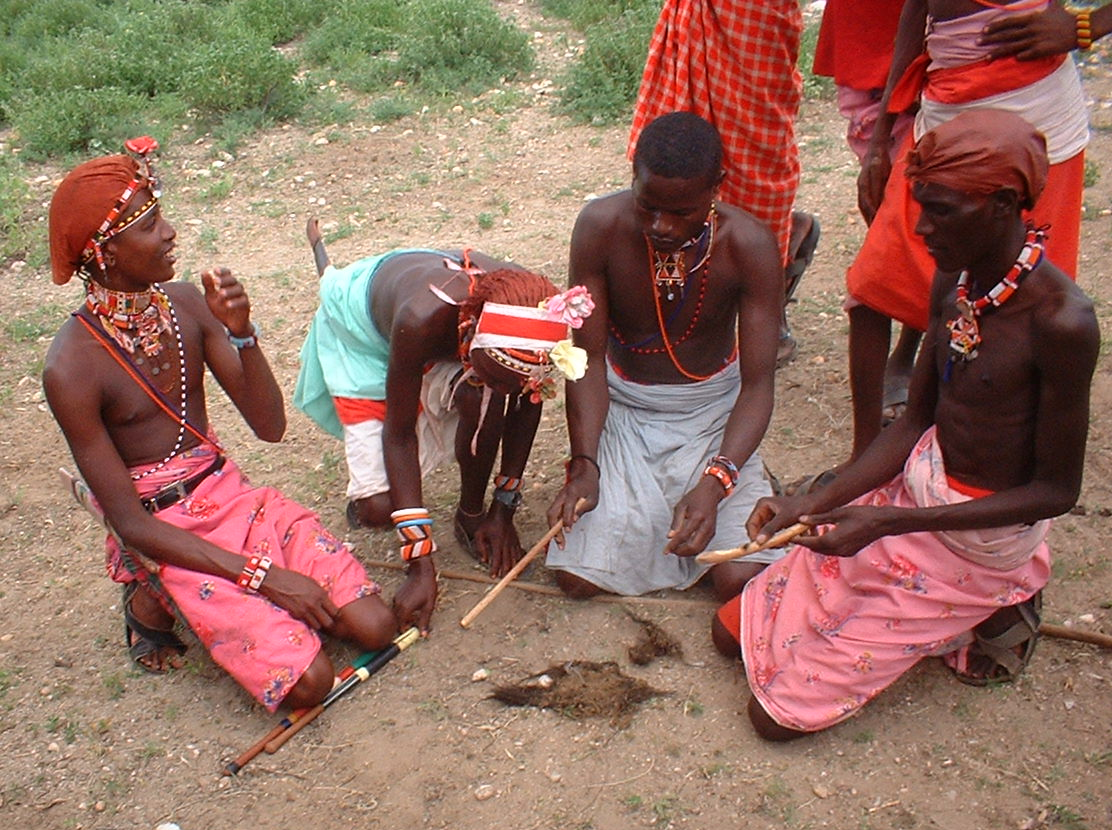
Samburu men lighting a fire with traditional method

Traditionally, Samburu relied almost solely on their herds, although trade with their agricultural neighbors and use of wild foods were also important. Before the colonial period, cow, goat, and sheep milk was the daily staple. Oral and documentary evidence suggests that small stock were significant to the diet and economy at least from the eighteenth century forward. In the twenty-first century, cattle and small stock continue to be essential to the Samburu economy and social system. Milk is still a valued part of Samburu contemporary diet when available, and may be drunk either fresh, or fermented; "ripened" milk is often considered superior. Meat from cattle is eaten mainly on ceremonial occasions, or when a cow happens to die. Meat from small stock is eaten more commonly, though still not on a regular basis. Today Samburu rely increasingly on purchased agricultural products— with money acquired mainly from livestock sales— and most commonly maize meal is made into a porridge. Tea is also very common, taken with large quantities of sugar and (when possible) much milk, and is a staple of contemporary Samburu diet. Blood is both taken from living animals, and collected from slaughtered ones. There are at least thirteen ways that blood can be prepared, and may form a whole meal. Some Samburu have turned to agriculture, with varying results.

=== Circumcision ===
Samburu practice both circumsision and female genital mutilation, which is illegal in Kenya. Boys get circumcised in their teenage years, and most girls are subjected to genital cutting before marriage. Girls who have not yet undergone female circumcision are at risk of being raped as part of a practice referred to as "beading", and are not allowed to have children.

== Religion ==
Samburu religion traditionally focuses on their multi-faceted divinity (Nkai). Nkai (a feminine noun), plays an active role in the lives of contemporary Samburu. It is not uncommon for children and young people, especially women, to report visions of Nkai. Some of these children prophesy for some period of time and a few gain a reputation for prophecy throughout their lives. Besides these spontaneous prophets, Samburu have ritual diviners, or shamans, called 'loibonok' who divine the causes of individual illnesses and misfortune, and guide warriors.

Samburu believe that Nkai is the source of all protection from the hazards of their existence. But Nkai also inflicts punishment if an elder curses a junior for some show of disrespect. The elder’s anger is seen as an appeal to Nkai, and it is Nkai who decides if the curse is justified. Faced with misfortune and following some show of disrespect towards an older man, the victim should approach his senior and offer reparation in return for his blessing. This calms the elder's anger and restores Nkai’s protection. It is, however, uncommon for an elder to curse a junior. Curses are reserved for cases of extreme disrespect.

Many Samburu have become Christians.

== In Western popular culture ==
Samburu have been widely portrayed in popular culture, ranging from Hollywood movies, major television commercials, and mainstream journalism. Such portrayals make use of Samburu’s colorful cultural traditions, but sometimes at the expense of accuracy. One of the earlier film appearances by Samburu was in the 1953 John Ford classic Mogambo, in which they served as background for stars such as Clark Gable, Grace Kelly and Ava Gardner.

In the 1990s, 300 Samburu traveled to South Africa to play opposite Kevin Bacon in the basketball comedy The Air Up There, in which Samburu are portrayed as a group called “The Winabi” whose prince is a potential hoops star who would propel Bacon to a college head coaching job. Samburu extras were used to portray members of the closely related, but better known, Maasai ethnic group as in the film The Ghost and the Darkness, starring Michael Douglas and Val Kilmer. The 2005 film The White Masai—about a Swiss woman falling in love with a Samburu man—similarly conflates the two ethnic groups, mainly because the authors and directors believed that no one would have heard of Samburu.

Dancing Samburu were included in a MasterCard commercial. Samburu runners were famously portrayed in a late 1980s Nike commercial, in which a Samburu man's words were translated into English as the Nike slogan “Just Do It.” This was corrected by anthropologist Lee Cronk, who seeing the commercial alerted Nike and the media that the Samburu man was saying, “Mayieu kuna. Ijooki inamuk sapukin” which actually translated as “I don’t want these. Give me big shoes.” Nike, in explaining the error, admitted to having improvised the dialogue and stated “we thought nobody in America would know what he said."

A tribe in season 3 of the U.S. reality television series Survivor, which was filmed in Kenya in 2001, was named Samburu.

== Recent conflicts ==
In a 2009 article MSNBC took readers on a tour through places purported to be in Samburu County, while asserting that conflicts between Samburu and the neighboring Pokot people was the result of both sides starving because they had more cattle than the rangelands could support.

Armed conflict between the Samburu and Pokot tribes has escalated since 2010. It is almost entirely centered upon the declining pastures available for increasing cattle herd sizes, numbering now as many as 1,500 cattle in a single herd. With the recurrent droughts since 2010, and catastrophic drought of 2017, the battles for pasture have led to both sides invading the private ranches and nature conservancies of Laikipia County. The armed conflict was incited by politicians who use it to improve their credentials among pastoralist communities.

== See also ==
- Natural Justice: Lawyers for Communities and the Environment (South Africa)
- Samburu Project

== Additional reading ==
- Nigel Pavitt, "Samburu", ISBN 1-85626-429-7
