= Oretab Talai =

Oretab Talai (also Talai) is one of the ortinwek or clans of the Kalenjin, a Nilotic tribe living in East Africa. Nandi Talai elders gained particular notability during the 2022 Kenyan general elections when a blessing ritual they performed on then Deputy President William Ruto gained symbolism as an act perceived as bestowing not just community leadership but also future national leadership. Much was made in the commentary surrounding the event of the fact that Nandi Talai elders had performed similar blessing rituals for the late Kenyan Presidents Jomo Kenyatta, Daniel Arap Moi, Mwai Kibaki and even the former Prime Minister Raila Odinga before they ascended to national leadership positions.

The perception of symbolism was heightened when Gideon Moi, former president Daniel Arap Moi's son and political heir, and William Ruto's primary competitor for regional political dominance at the time, attempted to have the blessings conferred upon him but was blocked. He later had the ceremony carried out by Nandi Talai elders from the Kapsisiywo family at Kabarak, the Moi family's seat of political power, both these events made national news and were widely commented upon.

The Nandi Talai have traditionally been noted for being the oret of the Orkoiik, most famously Koitalel and Kimnyole. The family later gave rise to the Kipsigis Orkoinotet which was established by Kipeles Arap Kipchomber, son of Kimnyole.

== Tiondo / Totem ==
The totem of the Talai among the Nandi and Kipsigis is the lion.

== The Pokot Talai ==
There are two Pokot Talai clans. One has the White Necked Raven as their totem. This group trace their roots to Teyoi hill commonly known as Patar hill in Cherangani ranges and is believed to have had the Lion originally as their totem.

The other Talai clan has baboon as their totem. They usually write their clan name as Talay and they trace the clan origin to Tapasiat, which is now known by its Karamojong name, Moroto.

== Role in the Nandi resistance ==
See; Nandi Resistance

The Talai and in particular the person and family of the Orkoiyot, Koitalel, were active participants and drivers of the Nandi Resistance. The clan suffered the brunt of the efforts to suppress the resistance.

=== Colonial oppression & rights abuse ===
In 2022 a group of more than 100,000 Kenyans from the Kipsigis Talai clan wrote to Prince William to seek an apology, and his support for reparations for human rights abuses they claimed that they suffered during the British colonial settlement. A UN inquiry from 2021 had determined that gross human rights violations were committed particularly against the clan, including unlawful killing, sexual violence, torture, and arbitrary detention and displacement.

== Families ==
=== Nandi ===
Among the Nandi, noted Talai families include the Kapturgat, the Kapsogon, the Kapchesang, the Kapmararsoi and the Kapsonet.

== Famous Talai ==
- Kimnyole arap Turukat
- Koitalel arap Samoei
- Barsirian arap Manyei
- Eliud Kipchoge
- Barnaba Korir
- Luke kibiwott arapjapan
