= Settlement of Nandi =

Process of the Nandi people settling in Nandi County, Kenya

The Settlement of Nandi was the historical process by which the various communities that today make up the Nandi people of Kenya settled in Nandi County. It is captured in the folklore of the Nandi as a distinct process composed of a series of inward migrations by members from various Kalenjin ortinwek.

== Origins ==
According to the Kalenjin narrative of origin, the Nandi identity formed from the separation of what had been a combined group of Kipsigis and Nandi. They had been living at Rongai near Nakuru as a united group for sometime before they were forced to separate due to antagonistic environmental factors, notably droughts and invasion of the Maasai from Uasin Gishu.

Kipsigis traditions recorded by Orchadson (1927) concur that the Kipsigis and Nandi had been a united identity through to the early nineteenth century. About this time they moved southwards through country occupied by Masai, "probably the present Uasin Gishu country" where they accidentally got split in two by a wedge of Masai who Orchadson records as being "Uasin Gishu (Masai) living in Kipchoriat (Nyando) valley". Accounts from Hollis however refer to a "branch called 'L-osigella or Segelli [who] took refuge in the Nyando valley but were wiped out by the Nandi and Lumbwa...It was from them that the Nandi obtained their system of rule by medicine-men.

== Ortinwek origins ==
The Nandi account of the formation of the tribe however displays a more complex pattern of settlement. The Kalenjin ortinwek that moved into and occupied the Nandi area, thus becoming the Nandi tribe, came;

- From Elgon & Lumbwa

Kipoiis
Kipamwi
Kipkenda
Kipiegen

- From Lo-'sekelae Masai

Kipkoiitim (also partly from Elgon)
Talai, the medicine men's clan (partly also from Kamasya)
Toyoi

- From Elgon

Kipkokos

- From Elgon & Elgeyo

Kipsirgio
Moi
Sokom
Kiptopkei
Kamwaikei

- From Lumbwa

Tungo
Kipaa
Kipasiso and Kapchemuri (Chemuri)
Elgoni (Kony)

== Territory ==
=== Settlement ===
The traditional Nandi account is that the first settlers in their country came from Elgon and formed the Kipoiis clan; a name that possibly means 'the spirits'. They were led by a man named Kakipoch, founder of the Nandi section of the Kalenjin and are said to have settled in the emet (county) of Aldai in south-western Nandi. One of the earliest Bororiet was named after Kakipoch and the site of his grave, still shown on Chepilat hill in Aldai was marked by the stump of an ancient olive tree. The account of his burial is that his body was laid on ox-hide, together with his possessions, and left for the hyenas.

Studies of the settlement pattern indicate that the southern regions were the first to be settled. As of 1910, these were the emet of Aldai on the west and the, by then annexed, emet of Soiin on the east. It was conjectured that the first pororosiek were Kakipoch in Aldai and Tuken in Soiin.

It is notable that Sirikwa holes (known to the Nandi as mukowanisiek) were almost non-existent in the areas first settled, being only present on the Nandi Escarpment itself. They were however found in great numbers in the northern regions of Nandi.

=== Central emotinwek ===
Inward migrants and general population growth are thought to have led to a northward expansion of the growing identity during the eighteenth century. This period is thought to have seen the occupation and establishment of the emotinwek of Chesume, Emgwen and Masop. This period would also have seen the establishment of more pororosiek.

=== Northern emotinwek ===
The final expansion occurred during the middle of the nineteenth century when the Nandi took the Uain Gishu plateau from the Uasin Gishu.

Traditions contained in the tale of Tapkendi however seem to indicate that the plateau was previously held by the Nandi and that Nandi place names were superseded by Maasai names. This as was noted is further evinced by certain "Masai place-names in eastern Nandi which indicate that the Masai had temporary possession of strip of Nandi roughly five miles wide", these include Ndalat, Lolkeringeti, Nduele and Ol-lesos, which were by the early nineteenth century in use by the Nandi as koret (district) names.

== Early-19th Century ==
Kipsigis traditions such as those recorded by Orchadson (1927), state that at a time when the Kipsigis and Nandi were a united identity, they moved southwards through country occupied by 'Masai'. Orchadson notes that this was "probably the present Uasin Gishu country". Here, they accidentally got split in two by a wedge of Masai who Orchadson records as being "Uasin Gishu (Masai) living in Kipchoriat (Nyando) valley". Accounts from Hollis however refer to a "branch called 'L-osigella or Segelli [who] took refuge in the Nyando valley but were wiped out by the Nandi and Lumbwa...It was from them that the Nandi obtained their system of rule by medicine-men.

This coincides with Maasai traditions which note that the Loosekelai (who are associated with the Siger i.e Sigerai) were attacked by an alliance of the Uasin Gishu and Siria communities.

No date is given for the Kipsigis and Nandi fracture which would be contemporaneous with the dates of establishment of these identities. However, Dobbs (1910) made notes on the initiation age-sets of the Lumbwa. He noted that the oldest age-set he could get notes on were the Maina who were initiated around 1856. None of this age-set or the following were alive at the time. He noted that the oldest interviewees and indeed the oldest Lumwba individuals at the time were between 64-67 years. He noted that they had been initiated in 1866 when they were about twelve to fifteen years old.

In spite of the oldest interviewees being alive at the time of the Maina initiations, Dobbs notes that "Although I made the most careful inquiries, I could find out nothing whatever about any circumcision age prior to 'Maina' (1856)".

=== Elgon & Lumbwa origins ===
==== Chemwal identity ====
The Nandi (or earlier Chemwal) identity is seen to have formed when Kakipoch settled with settlers from Elgon in Nandi. Tradition states that the Kipoiis clan were later joined by people from Lumbwa. From the Kalenjin narrative of origin, a distinct Chemwal (predating Nandi) identity appears to have formed when the Nandi and Lumbwa sections separated. They are said to have been escaping a variety of factors, notably drought and attack by the Uasin Gishu Maasai. The Kipsigis moved southwards, settling around Kericho while the Nandi continued west and settled at Aldai. Both traditions thus concur in placing the Elgon and Lumbwa origins clans as the drivers of a differentiated Chemwal identity.

Certain peculiarities were recorded about these clans that may point to the circumstance of settlement. For instance, the Kipoiis were not permitted to build their homes by the roadside, indicating a prior settlement pattern where the opposite might have been the case and a general retreat away from accessible places. Both are known to be the case, given the social climate of the time.

Peculiarities recorded about the Kipamwi however, indicate that they might have been ancestral to the region. The previous area of occupancy of the Kipamwi was Mt. Elgon, Sotik and Kosowa (the latter two forested regions in prior times). Further the Kipamwi of the turn of the nineteenth century were "great hunters and (lived) largely by the chase", they also were not allowed to plant millet nor could they interact "whatsoever with the smiths", they were not "even" allowed to "build their huts in the proximity of the smiths, buy their weapons direct from them, or allow their goats to meet the goats belonging to the smiths on the road".

=== Elgon& Elgeyo origins ===
==== c.1830 Retreat from Elgon ====
Nandi occupied territory previously stretched as far north as the sources of the Nzoia River i.e. Mt. Elgon, a territory that had been occupied by the Nandi as lately as the mid-19th century. The Karamojong raided the northern Nandi sections twice before the Nandi launched a big raid against them at Choo hill near the junction of Kanyangareng & Turkwel rivers. The Masinko clan of Karamojong who were pasturing here counterattacked and successfully drove of the Nandi raiders.

In response to the Nandi raid, the Karimojong organized a powerful force to break up the Nandi nearest the Turkwel-Nzoia watershed but the expedition returned and reported that the Nandi had withdrawn too far south. The Karamojong were unmolested by the Nandi from that time and the Turkwel-Nzoia watershed became a no-mans land.

Certain broad peculiarities regarding those clans that interacted with the Karamojong bore similarities. For instance, these clans were generally prohibited from crossing into prior southern zones of influence. The Sokom for example, were prohibited from settling in Kavirondo or Lumbwa, the Moi were not allowed to raid in Kamasia or in Kavirondo and the Kamwaike were prohibited from settling in Nyangori.

=== Segelai Maasai ===
==== c.1830 Uasin Gishu - Siger war ====
The traditions recorded by Orchadson date contact with the population in Kipchoriat valley to the about the same time as the formation of Nandi identity. The traditions collected by Dobbs dates this to the early 19th century. This is congruent with current understanding of the Orkoinotet whose establishment among the Nandi is dated to the early 19th century.

The clans that interacted with the Siger shared many of the similarities of the Nandi clans of the period. The Talai for instance were not allowed to settle in Nyangori or Kamasia. There were particular privileges that became attached to the Orkoinotet, maybe since inception or during the course of the century. These included such rights as the right to keep donkeys - a stock animal of the expansive northern districts. This right was barred to other clans including the Uasin Gishu smiths who would come with donkeys during later decades. Hollis also made note of the fact that the Orkoiyot's wives "may do no work, all their household duties being performed by servants, called otuagik". These privileges largely rested with the bearer of the office however and did not extend to the clan, though all children of the Talai clan wore a special necklace made of gourds, known as septook.

== c.1850 ==
=== Lumbwa origins ===
The second Lumbwa stream of clans consisted of the Tungo, Kipaa, Kipasiso and Kapchemuri (Chemuri) as well as Elgoni (Koni).

Certain peculiarities recorded about these clans may point to skills that they brought with them. For instance, by the late 19th and early 20th centuries, the Kipasiso were highly sought out and "engaged to erect the korosiot sticks at weddings". This clan was thus perceived and possibly possessed of some form of knowledge surrounding wedding rituals. The Tungo at the same time, were "held in high esteem, and one of their number is selected as a judge or umpire in all disputes". This clan might thus have been perceived or displayed characteristics of sober mindedness or perhaps a prior knowledge of a superior (i.e in relation to perceived justice) set of laws.
