= History of the Kalenjin people =

The history of the Kalenjin people encompasses the ancestral, linguistic, and cultural trajectory of a Southern Nilotic "Speech Community" indigenous to the highlands of East Africa. Archaeological and linguistic evidence suggests a primordial presence in the region dating back several millennia, characterized by a continuity that predates modern colonial and administrative boundaries.

Ancestrally, the Kalenjin are descendants of the Southern Nilotic populations who migrated from the South Sudan and Ethiopia borderlands during the "African Classical Age" (c. 1000 B.C. to A.D. 400). This era was defined by profound cultural synthesis with Eastern Cushitic-speaking communities and interactions with aboriginal inhabitants such as the Ogiek (Dorobo) and the Agumba/Umpua of the Mau Forest and Mount Kenya regions.

The broader historical collective, internally recognized as Biikap Kuutiit, consists of over 20 cultural tribes and sub-groups across Kenya, Uganda, and Tanzania. While modern administrative frameworks, such as the KNBS census, formally audit 17 specific tribes in Kenya, the historical sphere extends to the Sebei (Sabiny) of Uganda and the Datooga clusters of Tanzania.

== Early Nilotic heritage ==
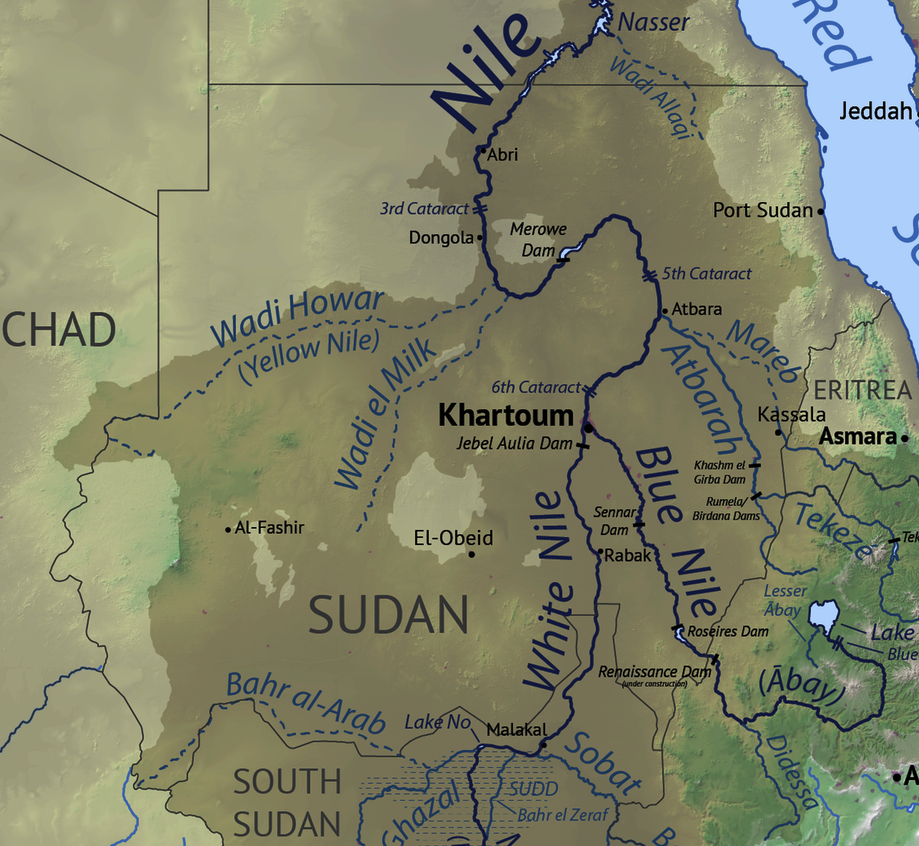
Map of Nile tributaries in modern Sudan

The earliest ancestors of Nilotic-speaking peoples emerged from mobile pastoralist communities that inhabited the now-extinct river system of the Lower Wadi Howar (Yellow Nile) during the Mid-Holocene (c. 6000–4000 BCE). These groups practiced cattle herding, fishing, and limited agriculture, and maintained strong cultural links with pre-Kerma societies of the Nubian Nile Valley. As the Sahara gradually became more arid after 4000 BCE, they migrated eastward into the Nile Valley and the White Nile basin, forming the demographic and cultural roots of what would become the Nilotic-speaking world. Composed of varied distinct identities, they were commonly collectively referred to as the Nehesy (southerners) by the ancient Egyptians, Aethiopians by the Greeks and Cushi (Cushites or Kushites) by the Israelites, a term that possibly derived from their own name for themselves.

By the third millennium BCE, a proto-Nilotic identity had taken shape, likely tied to the development of pastoralism. Archaeological sites such as Kadero—located just north of Khartoum—demonstrate that communities associated with early Nilotic culture were already well established in the Nile Valley by the early third millennium BCE. This period is contemporaneous with pre-dynastic Egypt.

== Antiquity ==
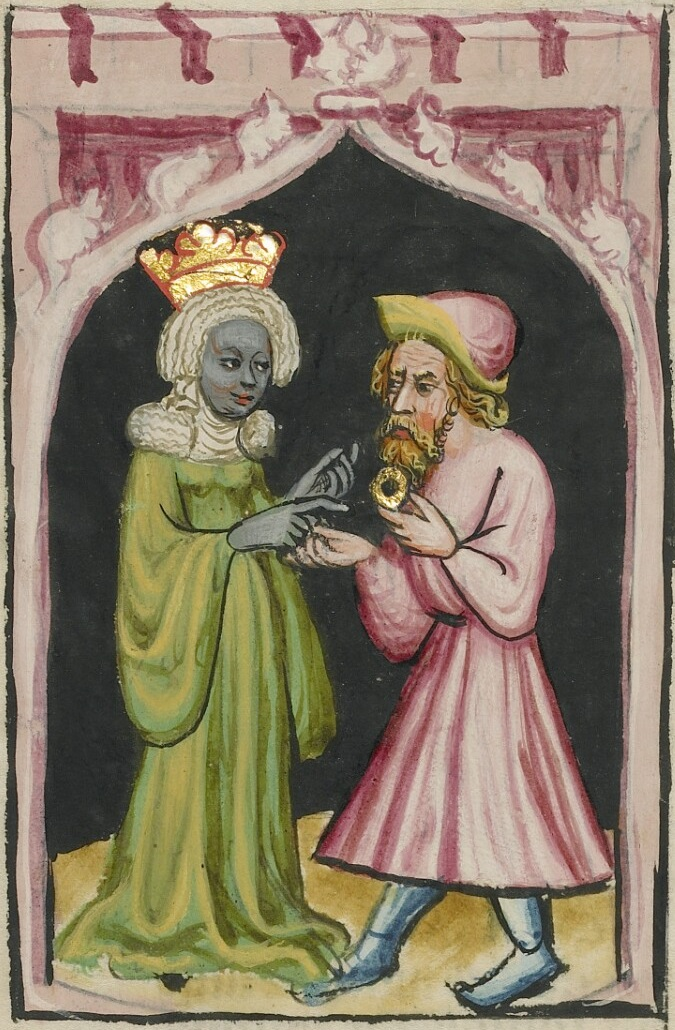
According to the first-century Romano-Jewish scholar Josephus, Tharbis was the daughter of an unnamed king of "Saba", which he claimed was in Ethiopia

In the early 6th century BCE, the Kushite heartland of Napata faced increasing threats from Egyptian military campaigns, including a major assault by Pharaoh Psamtik II in 593 BCE. In response, the Kushite elite gradually shifted their political center southward to Meroë, a region better protected and strategically located near rich iron deposits. Though Napata retained its religious significance, particularly the Temple of Amun located at today's Jebel Barkal, Meroë became the kingdom's administrative capital.

The city of Meroë was on the edge of what was known as the Island of Meroë. There were two other Meroitic cities in Butana: Aborepi and Naqa. The first of these sites was given the name Meroë by the Persian king Cambyses, in honor of his sister who was called by that name. The city had originally borne the ancient appellation Saba, named after the country's original founder. The eponym Seba is named for one of the sons of Cush (see Genesis 10:7). The presence of numerous Meroitic sites within the western Butana region and on the border of Butana proper is significant to the settlement of the core of the developed region. The orientation of these settlements exhibit the exercise of state power over subsistence production.

Nilotic presence in the Upper Nile is echoed in later classical sources such as Ptolemy's Geography (c. 150 CE), which locates a group called the Memnones between the Nile and the Blue Nile, near the region of Meroë—corresponding to the historical heartland of early Nilotic-speaking populations. Though speculative, the group Ptolemy names the Sapaei, situated south of the Memnones between the Nile and the Astapos (Blue Nile), may correspond to early Nilotic populations ancestral to the southern Nilotes. Their described location—likely within modern South Sudan—lies approximately 700–800 km north of Mount Elgon, in a south-southwesterly direction.

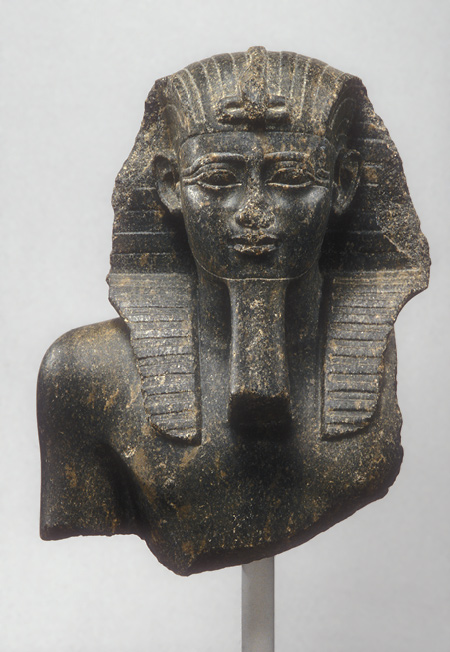
Psamtik I, pharaoh of Egypt 664–610 BC. According to Pliny, the Sape or Sapaei—also called 'Esar'— lived for 300 years in a town founded by Egyptians fleeing his rule.

Ethnographic accounts consistently identify the Mount Elgon region (Tulwet ab Kony, known as "Ol Doinyo Ilgoon," in Maasai which translates to "Breast Mountain" and as Masaba among the Bukusu) as a pivotal ancestral waypoint in the migration of Southern Nilotic-speaking peoples into Kenya. Among the Kalenjin, Mount Elgon and its residents is sometimes referred to as Kapkugo, meaning "grandparents’ place," reflecting its status in cultural memory as an ancestral homeland. The Kalenjin communities living around Elgon—particularly the Sabaot—have historically been grouped under the term Sebei, used in both Ugandan and Kenyan contexts to refer to the Nilotic highland peoples of the area. Similarly, a recurring myth among Datooga sub-tribes describes a homeland on a high mountain—Endabesht—overlooking two great lakes, widely interpreted as Lake Victoria and Lake Turkana. The memory captured in the name of the town - Endebess, one of the towns nearest to Mount Elgon in Kenya.

Ptolemy’s Sapaei might perhaps be associated with, or find resonance in, the people referred to by Pliny (77 CE) as the Sape—a group described in relation to towns founded by Egyptian exiles. According to Pliny’s source Bion, the Sape (called “Esar” by Aristocreon) were so named because the term meant “the strangers,” and were said to have dwelt for three hundred years in a town originally established by Egyptians fleeing the rule of Psammetichus (Psamtik I). These Sape had settlements on both sides of the Nile, with their capital, Sembobitis, located on an island, and a third town, Sinat, situated in Arabia. Their placement—five to twelve days’ journey south of Meroë—overlaps broadly with the region where Ptolemy, writing a few generations later, locates the Sapaei: a people situated between the Nile and the Astapos (Blue Nile), south of the Memnones.

Notably, a recurring pattern of toponyms and ethnonyms containing the root sb and sbt appears in regions and cultures associated with both the Sapaei and the Southern Nilotes or 'Sebei': the medieval Nubian capital of Alodia was called Soba, located near the confluence of the Blue and White Nile; further south, the Sobat River flows into the White Nile; roughly south of this river the Sebei and Sabaot people inhabit the Mount Elgon region (known as Masaba by the Bukusu); and among the Kalenjin, soba was a traditional greeting from an elder to a younger man, met with the response eba or epa—echoing forms of recognition or kinship. Similarly, the Nandi town of Kapsabet can be read literally to mean "the place of Sabet or Sobet," preserving the same linguistic root. Given the known Nandi propensity to add -t to the end of toponyms e.g. Eldoret, this is actually better read as "the place of Sabe or Sobe".

== Medieval ==
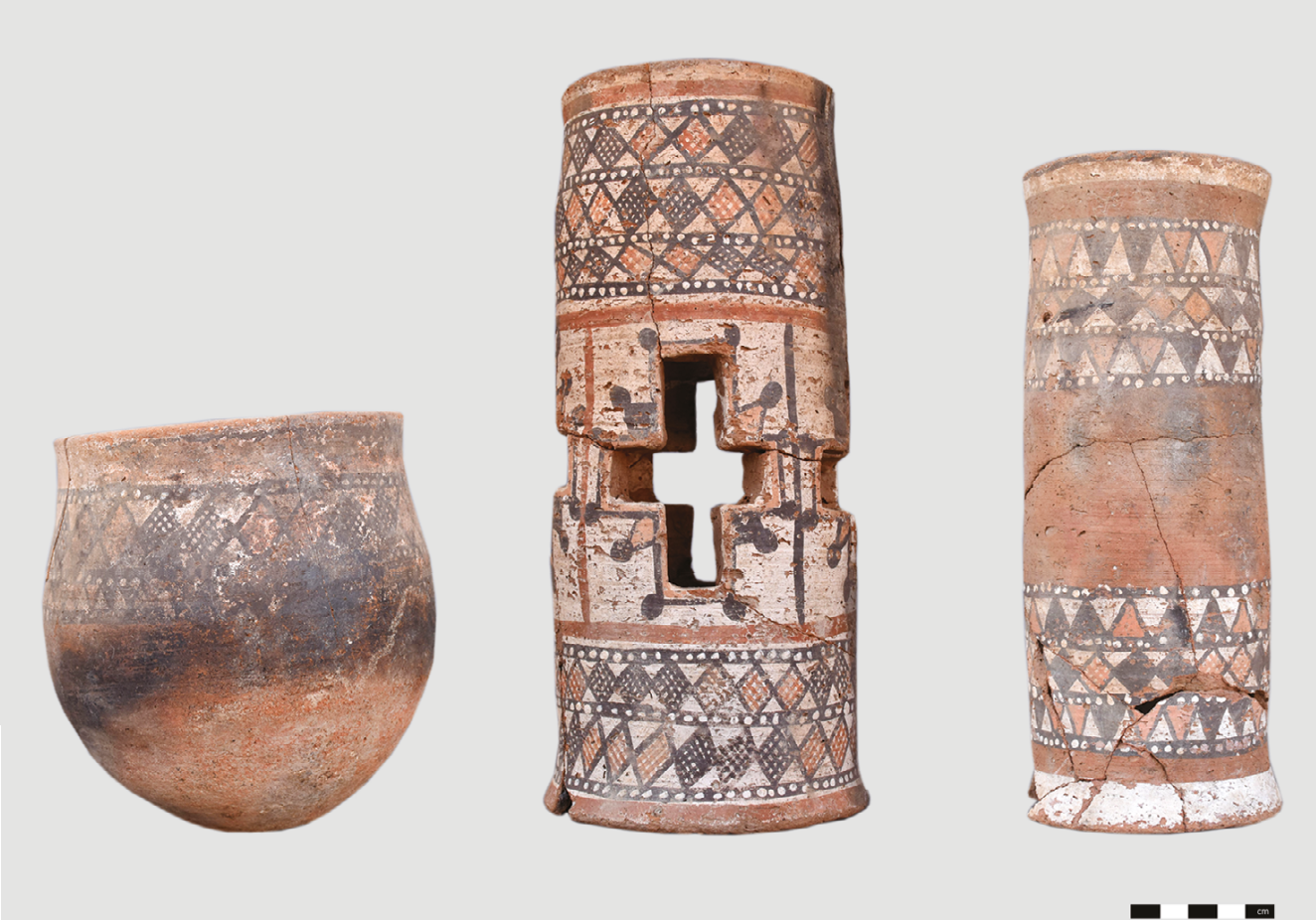
Pottery from Soba (Soba ware)

Starting in the 5th century, Nilotic-speaking groups began expanding southward from central Sudanese regions such as the Gezira into what is now South Sudan. This movement took place during a time of major political and cultural shifts across the Nile Valley. Even as late as the 4th century, the ancient Kushite kingdom still exerted influence in Lower Nubia, as seen in a joint embassy of Ethiopians (Kushites) and Blemmyes to Emperor Constantine around AD 336. But by the 5th century, Kushite political structures had collapsed, creating a power vacuum in the region.

The Nilotic migrations gained momentum in the 11th century, coinciding with the arrival of Arab traders in central Sudan. Although these movements significantly predate the collapse of the Christian Nubian kingdoms of Makuria and Alodia (around 1500 CE), they occurred after early contact with Arabs in the 9th and 10th centuries—a contact that may have introduced new cultural and technological elements, such as humpless cattle breeds. Environmental and economic pressures likely contributed to the shifting regional dynamics during this time. From the 10th to 12th centuries, the rise of Swahili coastal trade centers like Kilwa coupled with a prolonged period of drought (c. 1150–1500 CE) and signs of ecological strain around key towns like Soba, weakened the economic foundations of the Nubian polities including Alodia.

According to archaeologist Roland Oliver, this same period marks the emergence of the Iron Age among Nilotic groups. The combination of weakening Nubian polities, incoming technologies and trade networks, and internal cultural developments may have created the conditions that enabled—and perhaps compelled—Nilotic-speaking peoples to expand and adapt to regions further south.

It was during this era of southward migration that Nilotic-speaking groups—including the early ancestors of the Kalenjin—entered the highland and lake regions of East Africa ushering the Pastoral Iron Age.

== East African Pastoral neolithic ==
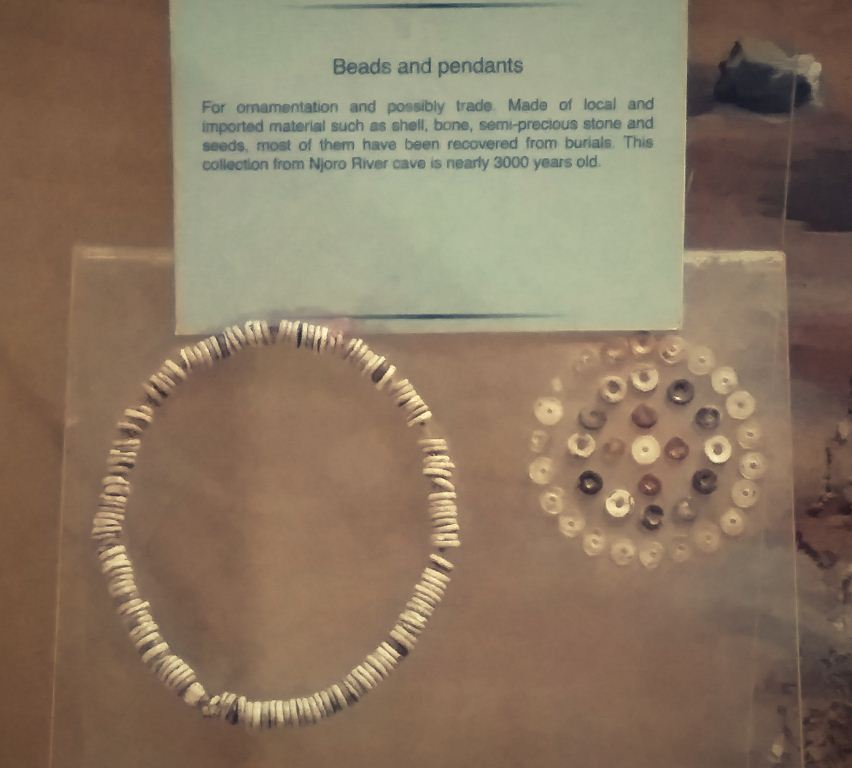
The beads and pendants forming this c. 3,000-year-old neck chain are of the Elmenteitan culture and were among the finds at Njoro River cave.

The Elmenteitan culture was a lithic industry and pottery tradition with a distinct pattern of land use, hunting and pastoralism that appeared and developed on the western plains of Kenya between approximately 1350BC and 750AD. The culture was named by archaeologist Louis Leakey after Lake Elmenteita (also Elementaita), a soda lake located about 120 km (75 mi) northwest of Nairobi.

Genomic data from individuals associated with Elmenteitan sites reveals a remarkably homogeneous ancestry, composed of roughly 80–85% Early Northeastern Pastoralist (ENP) ancestry, often associated with Afro-Asiatic (Cushitic) speakers, and 15–20% eastern African forager-related ancestry. The ENP component itself is a product of an earlier admixture event between populations related to ancient northeast Africans or Egyptians and groups with Sudan (Dinka)-related ancestry, dated to between 6000 and 5000 BP, perhaps related to the movement from the Yellow Nile. This genetic blend likely occurred in regions north of Lake Turkana before these pastoralists migrated southward. The rapid spread of pastoralists, both the Elmenteitan and the contemporaneous Savanna Pastoral Neolithic (SPN), into Kenya and Tanzania after ~3300 BP involved minimal gene flow between herders and foragers, plausibly due to the formation of a static frontier along which social barriers prevented large-scale gene flow, despite possible social and economic interaction

The Elmenteitan population shares a broad Afro-Asiatic ancestral origin with other Pastoral Neolithic groups such as the Savanna Pastoral Neolithic, yet differs significantly in population structure and settlement patterns. While SPN groups were more regionally dispersed and genetically diverse—likely due to multiple migration and admixture episodes—the Elmenteitan remained localized and genetically consistent, suggesting strong social cohesion and cultural continuity. Their subsistence strategy was heavily focused on pastoralism, especially the herding of cattle and caprines, with little evidence of cereal cultivation or fishing, although they may have supplemented their diet with wild resources.

Genome-wide studies show that most ancient eastern African pastoralists from the Pastoral Neolithic period (~3300–1200 BP), lacked the lactase persistence allele, meaning they were lactose intolerant. Despite this, they regularly consumed dairy—likely in fermented forms such as mursik or amasi —which reduces lactose content and aids digestion. This adaptation allowed pastoralism to thrive before genetic lactase persistence became more common in later populations.

While few large-scale excavations have been done on sites outside the Central Rift, regional surveys indicate that the population was far denser in the southern highlands during this time.

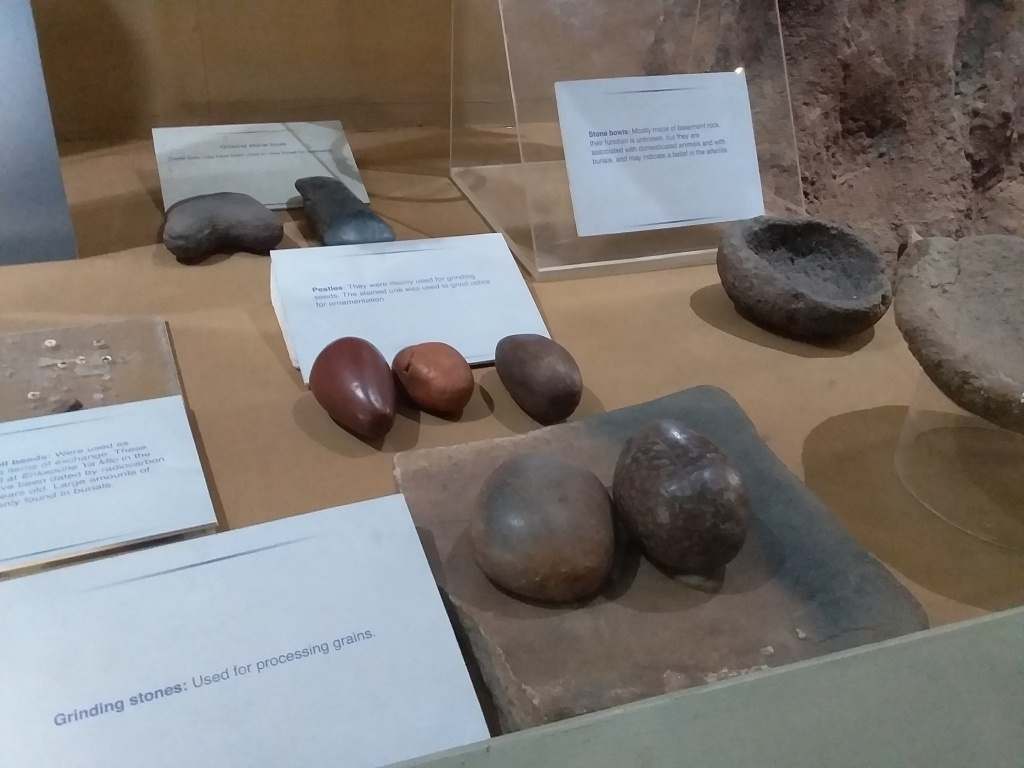
Grinding stones, pestles and axes of the East African Pastoral Neolithic

Archaeological evidence points to significant differences in ways of life between the Elmenteitan culture and the Savanna Pastoral Neolithic culture.

For both the Elmenteitan and SPN producing societies, obsidian was the dominant source of lithic raw material for tool production, though lower quality alternatives were used occasionally. The obsidian was sourced at two discrete points with the Elmenteitan culture sourcing their obsidian from an outcrop of green obsidian on the northeast slope of Mt. Eburu.

The bearers of the Elmenteitan culture cremated their deceased in caves as at Njoro River cave, Keringet caves and possibly Egerton caves, much unlike the Savanna Pastoral Neolithic culture who buried their dead in cairns. Both however had similar grave goods, which typically included stone bowls, pestle rubbers and palettes.

Certain distinct traits of present-day Southern Nilotic communities, notably in cultural practices such as dental avulsion, pottery styles, lithic industry, and burial practices, are evident in the archaeological record, suggesting a thread of continuity with the Elmenteitan tradition—one that is echoed not only in material culture but also, increasingly, in the genetic landscape of contemporary Kenyan populations such as the Maasai and Kikuyu.

== East African Pastoral iron age ==
The Sirikwa culture is a prominent archaeological tradition of the Kenyan hinterland that dates to the Pastoral Iron Age, roughly from AD 1200 to 1600 (see Medieval). It is widely seen as an outgrowth of the Elmenteitan Pastoral Neolithic, and its emergence coincides with increasing Nilotic demographic influence—evident in both the genetic record and the archaeological spread of fortified homesteads and new ceramic styles.

The name Sirikwa comes from a historically attested community remembered in oral traditions of the western highlands and referenced in colonial-era ethnographies. Though the archaeological culture found on the slopes of Mount Elgon, the Uasin Gishu plateau and adjacent Elgeyo escarpment now bears their name, the Sirikwa were likely one of several related groups contributing to this material tradition.

Oral traditions consistently locate the Sirikwa on the Uasin Gishu plateau prior to their dispersal in the mid-19th century. These traditions, particularly those preserved by the Nandi, Pokot and other Kalenjin groups, emphasize a multi-ethnic settlement pattern, with the Sirikwa forming one identifiable sub-tribe among others. Elements of this group were remembered under different names by neighboring communities: the Nandi referred to them as Sirikwek who lived in Mokwaniseik, and Uasin Gishu Maa-speakers remembered them as il-Mukwan, indicating a shared memory of a culturally distinct people associated with the plateau. The Kony of Mount Elgon say they were once part of the Uasin Gishu people.

Archaeological evidence reflects a highly sedentary way of life, marked by fortified homesteads featuring internal livestock pens, elaborate gate systems, and sentry posts—features designed more to deter thieves and rustlers than large-scale invasion. Coins of Indian and English origin found at Hyrax Hill suggest the bearers of the Sirikwa tradition were part of wider regional trade networks during this period.

Their territorial range at its peak extended from the Chepalungu and Mau forests to Mount Elgon and the Cherangany Hills, with earlier extensions into the Nakuru grasslands—later overtaken by the Maasai by the 17th century.

The Sirikwa identity eventually dissolved into emerging Kalenjin-speaking polities such as the Nandi, Kipsigis, and Pokot. However, their cultural legacy endures in family lineages, oral traditions, place names, and the archaeological record. The consistent presence of Sirikwa holes, tumuli, irrigation canals, and even megaliths—such as the one at Tobolwa in Nandi—testifies to a distinctive and influential Iron Age tradition.

In sum, the Sirikwa culture encapsulates the demographic, technological, and cultural transitions that shaped the East African highlands in the Late Iron Age.

== Pre-19th century ==
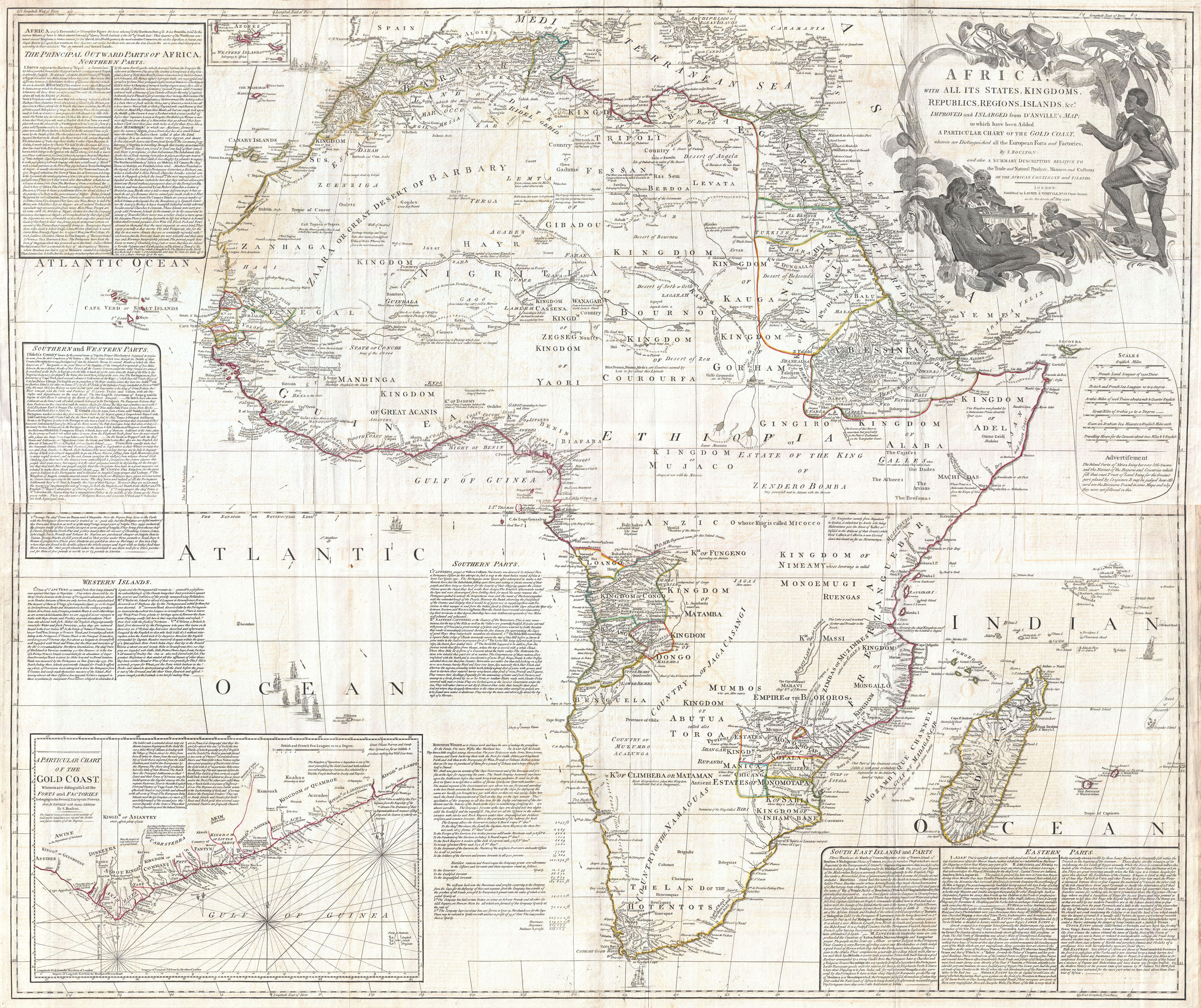
1794 Boulton and Anville Wall Map of Africa: Locates 'Gingiro Kingdom' in a region corresponding roughly to southern Sudan, northeastern Uganda, and northwestern Kenya.

A body of oral traditions from various East African communities points to the presence of at least four significant Kalenjin-speaking population groups present prior to the 19th century. Meru oral history describes the arrival of their ancestors at Mount Kenya where they interacted with a community referred to as Lumbwa. The Lumbwa occupied the lower reaches of Mount Kenya though the extent of their territory is presently unclear. North-east of this community, across the Rift Valley, a community known as the Chok (later Suk) occupied the Elgeyo escarpment. Pokot oral history describes their way of life, as that of the Siger (or Sengwer), a community that appears to have lived in association with the Chok. The name Siger, used by the Karamojong, derives from a distinctive cowrie-shell adornment favored by this community. The territory associated with the Siger extended from Mount Elgon through present-day Uasin Gishu and into neighboring counties. Further west, a community known as the Maliri occupied what is now the Jie and Dodoth region of northeastern Uganda. Karamojong oral traditions recount their gradual displacement of the Maliri over the course of the 18th and 19th centuries. The Maliri are believed by some to have entered the region six to eight centuries ago. This 1794 wall map, which locates the Kingdom of Gingiro in this same general area, offers some confirmation of these narratives—placing the polity in a zone corresponding roughly to southern South Sudan, northeastern Uganda, and northwestern Kenya. This attests to the presence of the Jie and Turkana, in the region by at least the late 18th century.

Bordering these communities were two distinct communities whose interactions and those with the Kalenjin-speaking communities would lead to notable cultural change. The Maliri in Uganda were neighbored by the Karamojong, an Iron Age community that practiced a pastoral way of life. To the north of the Sekker and Chok were the Oropom (Orupoi), a late neolithic society whose expansive territory is said to have stretched across Turkana and the surrounding region as well as into Uganda and Sudan. Wilson (1970) who collected traditions relating to the Oropom observed that the corpus of oral literature suggested that, at its tail end, the society "had become effete, after enjoying for a long period the fruits of a highly developed culture".

Towards the end of 18th century and through the 19th century, a series of droughts, plagues of locusts, epidemics, and in the final decades of the 19th century, a rapid succession of sub-continental epizootics affected these communities. There is an early record of the great Laparanat drought c.1785 that affected the Karamajong. However, for communities then resident in what is present-day Kenya many disaster narratives relate the start with the Aoyate, an acute meteorological drought that affected much of East and Southern Africa in the early nineteenth century.

== 19th century ==
Nile records indicate that the three decades starting about 1800 were marked by low rainfall levels in regions south of the Sahara. East African oral narratives and the few written records indicate peak aridity during the 1830s resulting in recorded instances of famine in 1829 and 1835 in Ethiopia and 1836 in Kenya. Among Kenyan Rift Valley communities this arid period, and the consequent series of events, have been referred to as Mutai.

A feature of the Mutai was increased conflict between neighboring communities, most noted of these has been the Iloikop wars. Earlier conflicts preceding the Iloikop wars appear to have brought about the pressures that resulted in this period of conflict. Von Höhnel (1894) and Lamphear (1988) recorded narratives concerning conflict between the Turkana and Burkineji or at least the section recalled as Sampur that appear to have been caused by even earlier demographic pressures.

=== Turkana - Burkineji conflict ===
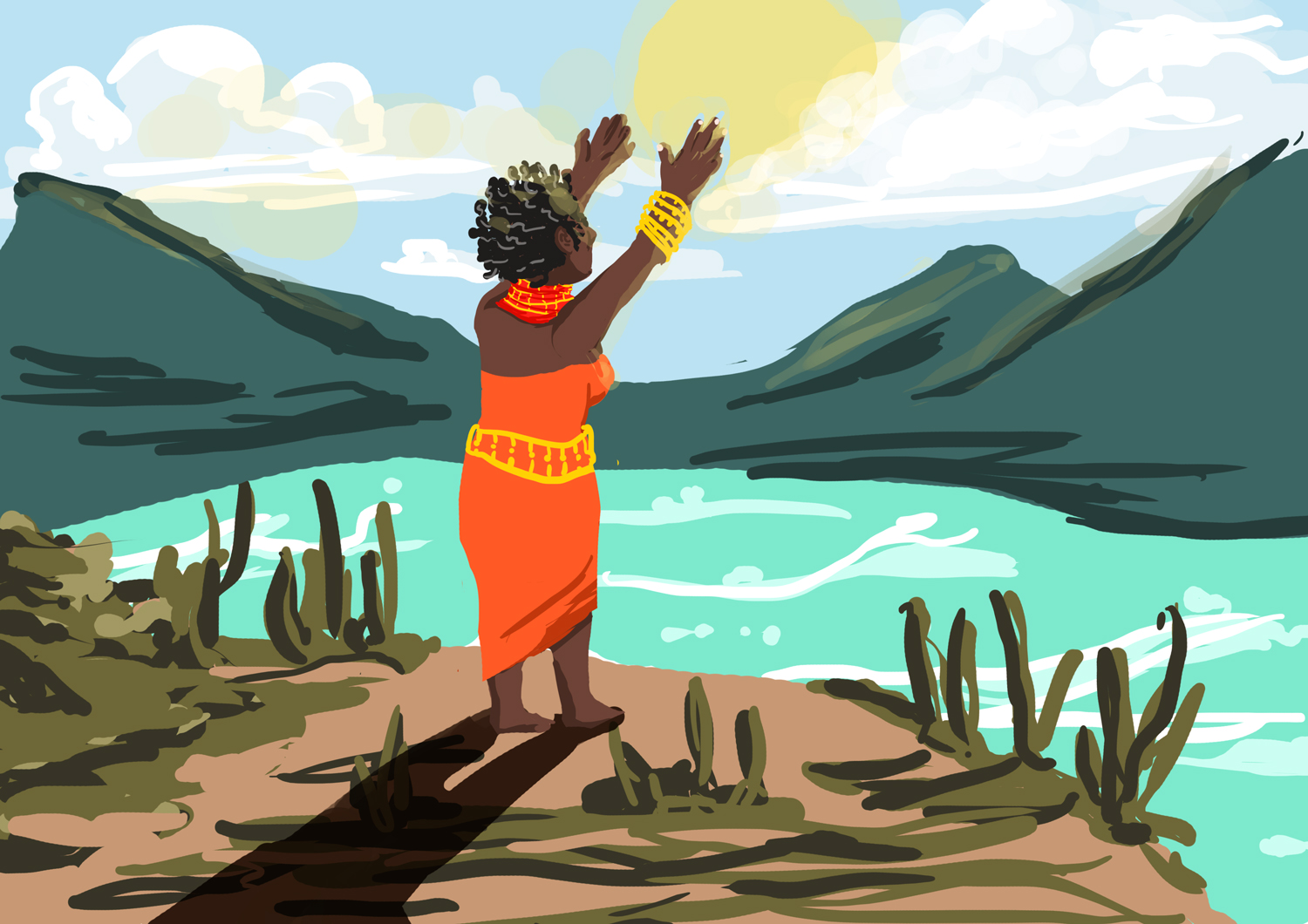
Many foundation narratives, such as that of Cheptalel, that relate events of this period associate the time with extreme aridity

Turkana narratives recorded by Lamphear (1988) provide a broad perspective of the prelude to the conflict between the Turkana and a community he refers to as Kor, a name by which the Turkana still call the Samburu in the present day.

By the end of the Palajam initiations, the developing Turkana community was experiencing strong ecological pressures. Behind them, up the escarpment in Karamoja, other evolvig Ateker societies such as the Karimojong and Dodos were occupying all available grazing lands. Therefore Turkana cattle camps began to push further down the Tarash, which ran northwards below the foothills of the Moru Assiger massif on their right and the escarpment on their left. As they advanced, the Turkana came to realize they were not alone in this new land. At night fires could be seen flickering on the slopes of nearby mountains, including Mt. Pelekee which loomed up in the distance directly before them...

— John Lamphear, 1988

Lamphear notes that Tukana traditions aver that a dreamer among them saw strange animals living with the people up in the hills. Turkana warriors were thus sent forward to capture one of these strange beasts, which the dreamer said looked 'like giraffes, but with humps on their backs'. The young men therefore went and captured one of these beasts - the first camels the Turkana had seen. The owners of the strange beasts appear to have struck the Turkana as strange as well. The Turkana saw them as 'red' people, partly because of their lighter skin and partly because they daubed their hair and bodies with reddish clay. They thus gave them the name 'Kor'. Lamphear states that Turkana traditions agree that the Kor were very numerous and lived in close pastoral association with two other communities known as 'Rantalle' and 'Poran', the names given to the Cushitic speaking Rendille and Boran communities.

According to Von Höhnel (1894) "a few decades" prior, the Burkineji occupied districts on the west of the lake and that they were later driven eastwards into present day Samburu. He later states that "some fifty years ago the Turkana owned part of the land on the west now occupied by the Karamoyo, whilst the southern portion of their land belonged to the Burkineji. The Karamoyo drove the Turkana further east, and the Turkana, in their turn, pushed the Burkineji towards Samburuland".

=== Collapse of Siger community ===
Lamphear states that Turkana narratives indicate that at the time of interaction with the 'Kor', the Turkana were in even closer proximity to a community referred to as Siger. This was the Karamoja name for the community and derived from an adornment that this community favored. The Siger like the Kor, were seen as a 'red' people, they are also remembered as a 'heterogeneous, multi-lingual confederation, including Southern and Eastern Nilotic-speakers, and those who spoke Cushitic dialects'. According to Turkana traditions the Siger once held most of the surrounding country 'until the Kor and their allies came up from the south and took it from them. In the process, the Kor and Siger had blended to some extent'.

According to Lamphears account, Turkana traditions directly relate the collapse of the 'Siger' to the Aoyate. He notes that;

...as Turkana cattle camps began making contact with these alien populations and their strange livestock, the area was beset by a terrible drought, the Aoyate, 'the long dry time'...The Siger community was decimated and began to collapse. Some abandoned their mountain and fled eastwards, but ran into even drier conditions: '[It] became dry and there was great hunger. The Siger went away to the east to Moru Eris, where most of them died of heat and starvation. So many died that there is still a place called Kabosan ["the rotten place"]'. Bands of Turkana fighting men forced the Siger northwards to the head of Lake Turkana...Still others were pushed back onto the Suk Hills to the south to be incorporated by the Southern-Nilotic speaking Pokot...Many were assimilated by the Turkana...and the victors took possession of the grazing and water resources of Moru Assiger

— As narrated to J. Lamphear, 1988

The collapse of the Siger/Sengwer community is generally believed to have seen the rise of a prophet-diviner class among many pastoral communities and a period marked by reformation.

Cultural changes, particularly the innovation of heavier and deadlier spears amongst the Loikop led to significant changes in methods and scale of raiding. The change in methods introduced by the Loikop also consisted of fundamental differences of strategy, in fighting and defense, and also in organization of settlements and of political life.

The cultural changes played a part in significant southward expansion of Loikop territory from a base east of Lake Turkana. This expansion led to the development of three groupings within Loikop society. The Sambur who occupied the 'original' country east of Lake Turkana as well as the Laikipia plateau. The Uasin Gishu occupied the grass plateaus now known as the Uasin Gishu and Mau while the Maasai territory extended from Naivasha to Kilimanjaro. This expansion was subsequently followed by the Iloikop wars.

The expansion of Turkana and Loikop societies led to significant change within the Sirikwa society. Some communities were annihilated by the combined effects of the Mutai of the 19th century while others adapted to the new era.

=== Iloikop wars ===
Members of collapsing communities were usually assimilated into ascending identities.

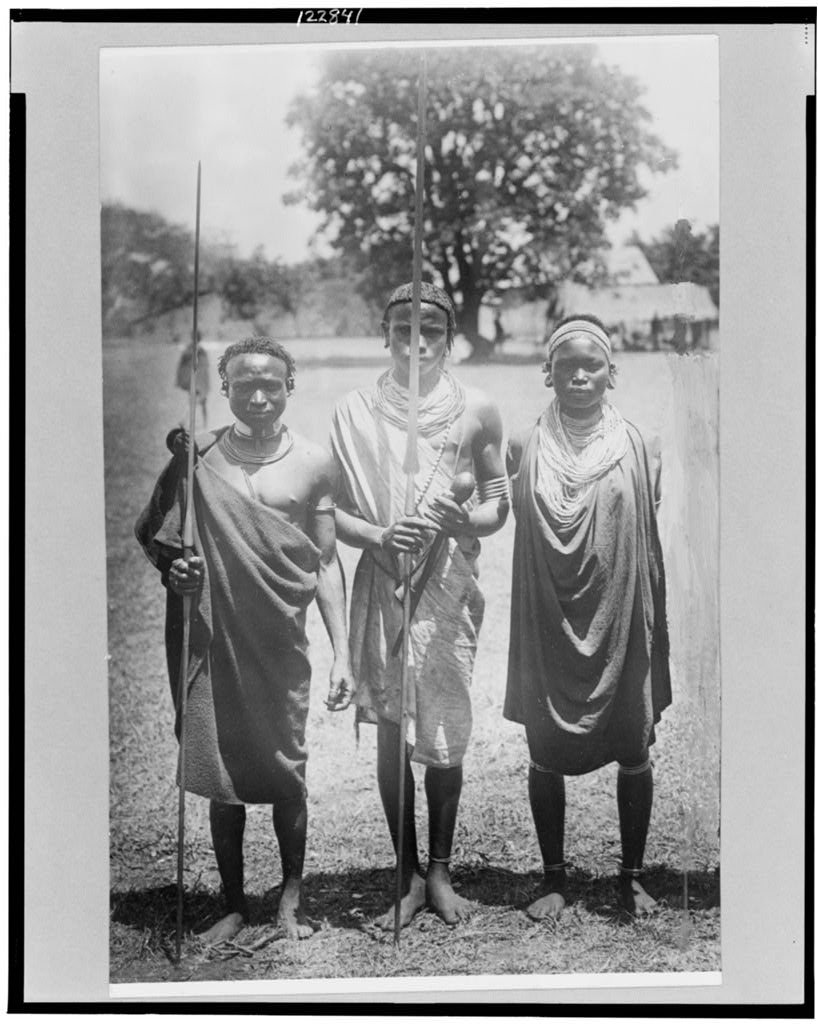
Three Nandi warriors. The 19th century saw wide annihilation and assimilation of many identities

Significant cultural change also occurred. Guarding cattle on the plateaus depended less on elaborate defenses and more on mobility and cooperation. Both of these requiring new grazing and herd-management strategies. The practice of the later Kalenjin – that is, after they had abandoned the Sirikwa pattern and had ceased in effect to be Sirikwa – illustrates this change vividly. On their reduced pastures, notably on the borders of the Uasin Gishu plateau, when bodies of raiders approached they would relay the alarm from ridge to ridge, so that the herds could be combined and rushed to the cover of the forests. There, the approaches to the glades would be defended by concealed archers, and the advantage would be turned against the spears of the plains warriors.

More than any of the other sections, the Nandi and Kipsigis, in response to Maasai expansion, borrowed from the Maasai some of the traits that would distinguish them from other Kalenjin: large-scale economic dependence on herding, military organization and aggressive cattle raiding, as well as centralized religious-political leadership. The family that established the office of Orkoiyot (warlord/diviner) among both the Nandi and Kipsigis were migrants from northern Chemwal regions. By the mid-nineteenth century, both the Nandi and Kipsigis were expanding at the expense of the Maasai.

The Iloikop wars ended in the 1870s with the defeat and dispersal of the Laikipiak. However, the new territory acquired by the Maasai was vast and left them overextended thus unable to occupy it effectively. This left them open to encroachment by other communities. By the early 1880s, Kamba, Kikuyu and acculturating Sirikwa/Kalenjin raiders were making inroads into Maasai territory, and the Maasai were struggling to control their resources of cattle and grazing land.

The latter decades of the nineteenth century, saw the early European explorers start advancing into the interior of Kenya. Many present-day identities were by then recognized and begin to appear in the written record. In the introduction to Beech's account on the Suk, Eliot notes that they seemed "unanimous in tracing their origin to two tribes called Chôk(or Chũk) and Sekker (and that) at present they call themselves Pôkwut...', he also recognizes five dialects, "Nandi, Kamasia, Endo (and) Suk, the difference being the greatest between the first and the last. The Maragwet language, which is presumably akin, appears not to have been studied, and there are probably others in the same case".

About the time contacts were being made this time, two instances of epizootics broke out in the Rift Valley region. In 1883, bovine Pleuro-Pneumonia spread from the north and lingered for several years. The effect of this was to cause the Loikop to regroup and to go out raiding more aggressively to replenish their herds. This was followed by a far more serious outbreak of Rinderpest which occurred in 1891.

This period - characterized by disasters, including a rinderpest epidemic, other stock diseases, drought, mass starvation, and smallpox was referred to as a Mutai.

== 20th century ==
=== Resistance to British rule ===
By the latter decades of the nineteenth century, the Kalenjin - more so the Nandi and Kipsigis, had acquired a fearsome reputation. Thompson was warned in 1883 to avoid the country of the Nandi, who were known for attacks on strangers and caravans that would attempt to scale the great massif of the Mau.

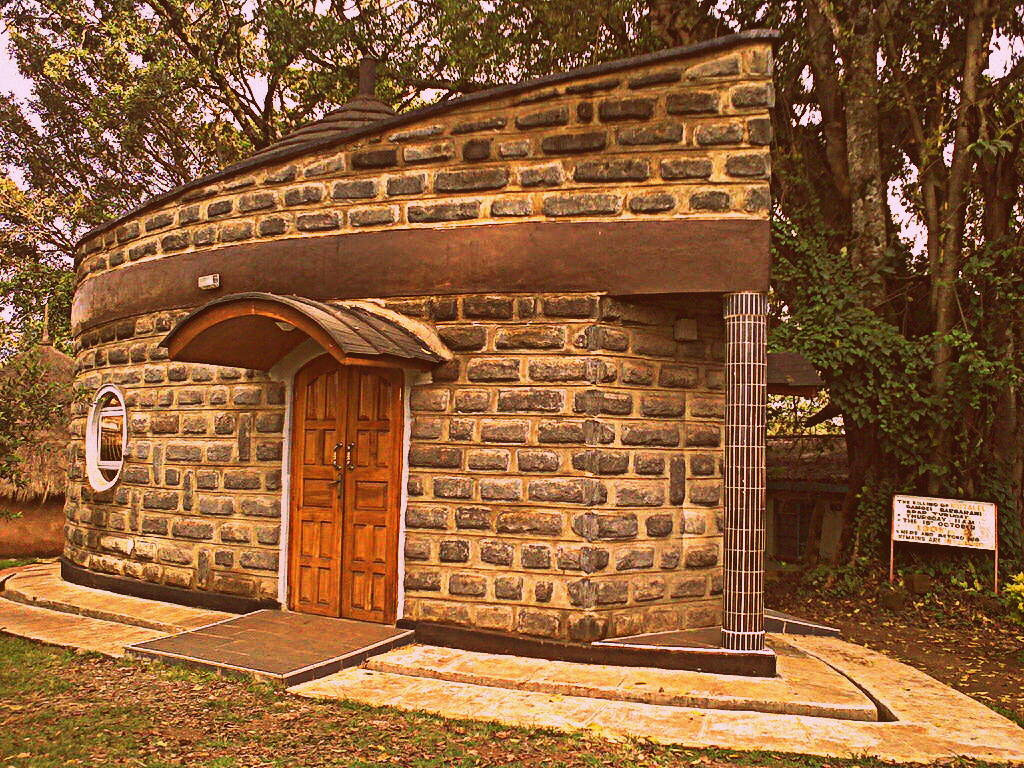
Koitalel Arap Samoei Mausoleum and Museum in Nandi Hills, Kenya

Nonetheless, trade relations were established between the Kalenjin and incoming British. This was tempered on the Kalenjin side by the prophesies of various seers. Among the Nandi, Kimnyole had warned that contact with the Europeans would have a significant impact on the Nandi while Mongo was said to have warned against fighting the Europeans.

Matson, in his account of the resistance, shows 'how the irresponsible actions of two British traders, Dick and West, quickly upset the precarious modus vivendi between the Nandi and incoming British'. Conflict, led on the Nandi side by Koitalel Arap Samoei - Nandi Orkoiyot at the time, was triggered by West's killing in 1895.

The East Africa Protectorate, Foreign Office, and missionary societies administrations reacted to West's death by organizing invasions of Nandi in 1895 and 1897. Invading forces were able to inflict sporadic losses upon Nandi warriors, steal hundreds of livestock, and burn villages, but were not able to end Nandi resistance.

1897 also saw the colonial government set up base in Eldama Ravine under the leadership of certain Messrs. Ternan and Grant, an intrusion that was not taken to kindly by the Lembus community. This triggered conflict between the Lembus and the British, the latter of whom fielded Maasai and Nubian soldiers and porters.

The British eventually overcame the Lembus following which Grant and Lembus elder's negotiated a peace agreement. During the negotiations, the Lembus were prevailed upon by Grant to state what they would not harm nor kill, to which the response was women. As such, they exchanged a girl from the Kimeito clan while Grant offered a white bull as a gesture of peace and friendship. This agreement was known as the Kerkwony Agreement. The negotiations were held where Kerkwony Stadium stands today.

On October 19, 1905, on the grounds of what is now Nandi Bears Club, Arap Samoei was asked to meet Col Richard Meinertzhagen for a truce. A grand-nephew of one of Arap Samoei's bodyguards later noted that “There were about 22 of them who went for a meeting with the (European) that day. Koitalel Arap Samoei had been advised not to shake hands because if he did, that would give him away as the leader. But he extended his hand and was shot immediately". Koitalel's death led to the end of the Nandi resistance.

== Formation of the Kalenjin Collective ==
The Kalenjin represent a unified cultural and linguistic collective, a primordial "Speech Community" known in the vernacular as Biikap Kuutiit. Originally classified by scholars and British colonial administrators as the "Nandi-speaking peoples," the Nandi and Kipsigis were historically the most prominent groups. Due to their military dominance and size during the early colonial period, their ethnonyms were frequently used by outsiders to represent the entire collective.

The formal adoption of the name Kalenjin in the 1940s and 1950s was not the creation of a new identity, but rather the organic continuation and modern consolidation of ancient ancestral and linguistic bonds that have defined the southern Nilotic highland peoples for centuries. In 1944, a group of fourteen students at Alliance High School, moved by this burgeoning indigenous terminology, adopted the term Kalenjin ("I tell you") for their peer group. This organic movement culminated in the founding of the Kalenjin Union in Eldoret in 1948, a milestone that formally restored and consolidated their ancient ancestral bonds into a unified modern cultural identity.Rottland, Franz (1982). Die Südnilotischen Sprachen. Dietrich Reimer.

=== 1950s–1964: Political Consolidation ===
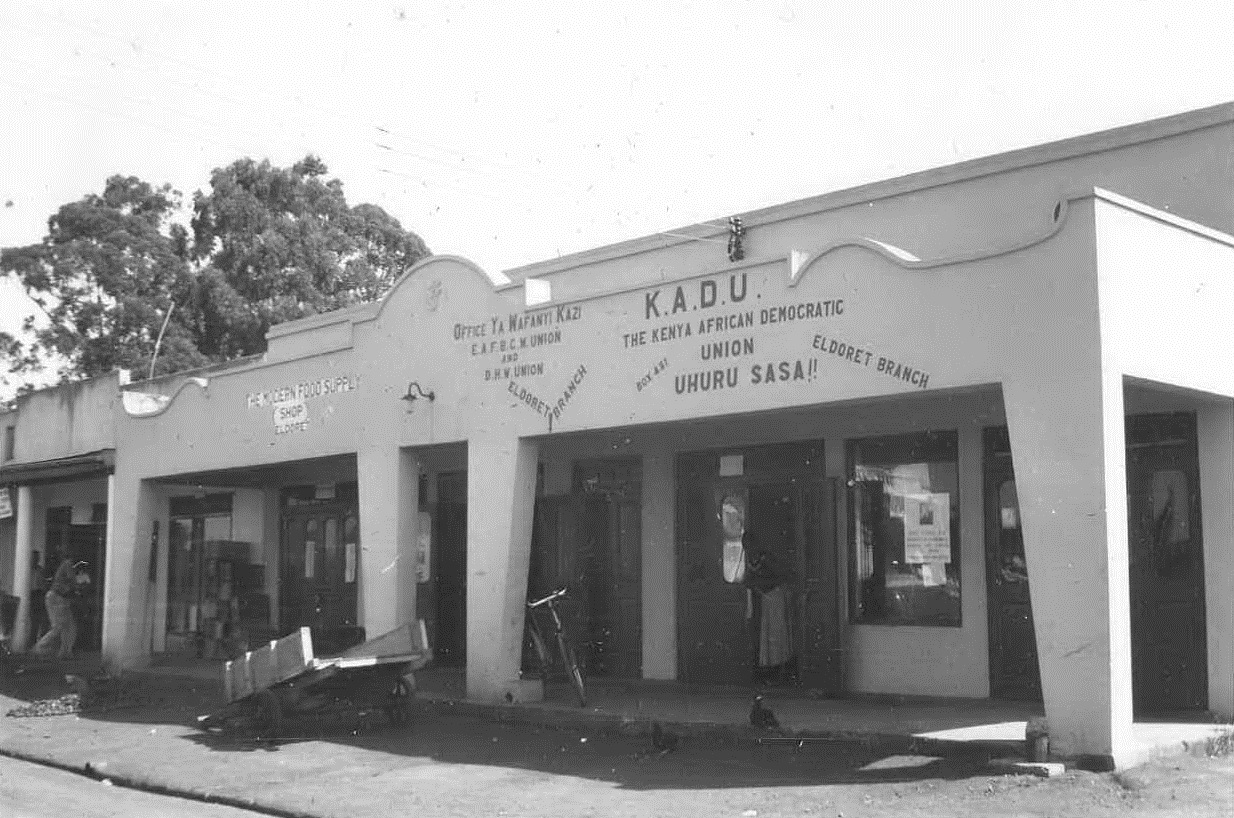
The Eldoret Branch of the Kenya African Democratic Union (KADU).

The newly consolidated identity quickly moved into the political sphere. In 1955, following the resignation of Mzee Tameno (a Maasai LegCo member), the Kalenjin unified behind a single candidate, Daniel arap Moi, to represent the Rift Valley.

By 1960, leaders including Moi and Ronald Ngala formed the Kenya African Democratic Union (KADU) to safeguard the interests of smaller ethnic groups through a platform of majimboism (devolution). Following the 1963 elections, KADU dissolved in 1964 to join the Kenya African National Union (KANU), marking the full integration of the Kalenjin collective into the national fabric of independent Kenya.

== 21st century ==
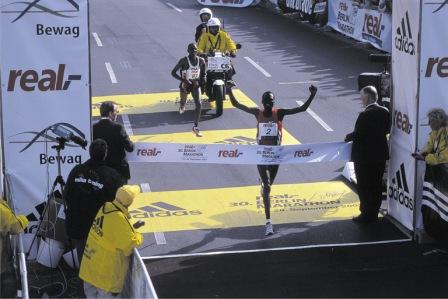
Paul Tergat set a new world record to the marathon at Berlin, 2003.

The Kalenjin have been called by some "the running tribe." Since the mid-1960s, Kenyan men have earned the largest share of major honours in international athletics at distances from 800 meters to the marathon; the vast majority of these Kenyan running stars have been Kalenjin. From 1980 on, about 40% of the top honours available to men in international athletics at these distances (Olympic medals, World Championships medals, and World Cross Country Championships honours) have been earned by Kalenjin.

In 2008, Pamela Jelimo became the first Kenyan woman to win a gold medal at the Olympics; she also became the first Kenyan to win the Golden League jackpot in the same year. Since then, Kenyan women have become a major presence in international athletics at the distances; most of these women are Kalenjin. Amby Burfoot of Runner's World stated that the odds of Kenya achieving the success they did at the 1988 Olympics were below 1:160 billion. Kenya had an even more successful Olympics in 2008.

A number of theories explaining the unusual athletic prowess among people from the tribe have been proposed. These include many explanations that apply equally well to other Kenyans or people living elsewhere who are not disproportionately successful athletes, such as that they run to school every day, that they live at relatively high altitude, and that the prize money from races is large compared to typical yearly earnings. One theory is that the Kalenjin has relatively thin legs and therefore does not have to lift so much leg weight when running long distances.
