= Kebulonik =

Town in Kenya

Kebulonik is a town in Mosop constituency, Nandi Hills, Nandi County, Kenya. Kebulonik forms part of Sangalo/Kebulonik administrative ward. It has two notable schools i.e. Kebulonik primary and Kebulonik secondary schools.

Kebulonik is a location found in nandi county in the previously Rift Valley Province in Kenya. Kebulonik forms part of Sang′alo/Kebulonik ward which has a population of 21,390 with an area of 121.10 km^{2}. Sang′alo/Kebulonik ward under the new constitution is headed by elected Member of county assembly Nobert Maiyo.
