= List of rulers of the Nandi =

List of Rulers of the Nandi (Kenya), or Orkoiyots:

(Dates in italics indicate de facto continuation of office) Oleiyo Barsabotwo and kobokoi

1. Turukat (son of Kopokoii)The name means Blessed Mouth _literary
2. Kimnyole (son of Torokat), killed by the Nandi in 1890. The Nandi area was formally incorporated into British East Africa in 1888 (though it submitted only in 1906.)
3. Koitalel Arap Samoei (son of Kimnyole), killed and decapitate by British forces in 1905.
4. Kipeles or Tamasun (also son of Kimnyole), whose reign continued past 1909.
5. Barsirian Arap Manyei (son of Koitalel Arap Samoei) reigned from 1919 to 1922 when he was detained by the British.

The Orkoiyots originated as chief ritual leaders (or "medicine men", later emerging as leaders exercising both political and military authority. The position is hereditary, and the dynasty descend from Maasai origins.
