= Nandi Resistance =

Prolonged Kalenjin-led conflict against British colonial occupation

Koitalel Arap Samoei Nandi Resistance The Kalenjin-led resistance
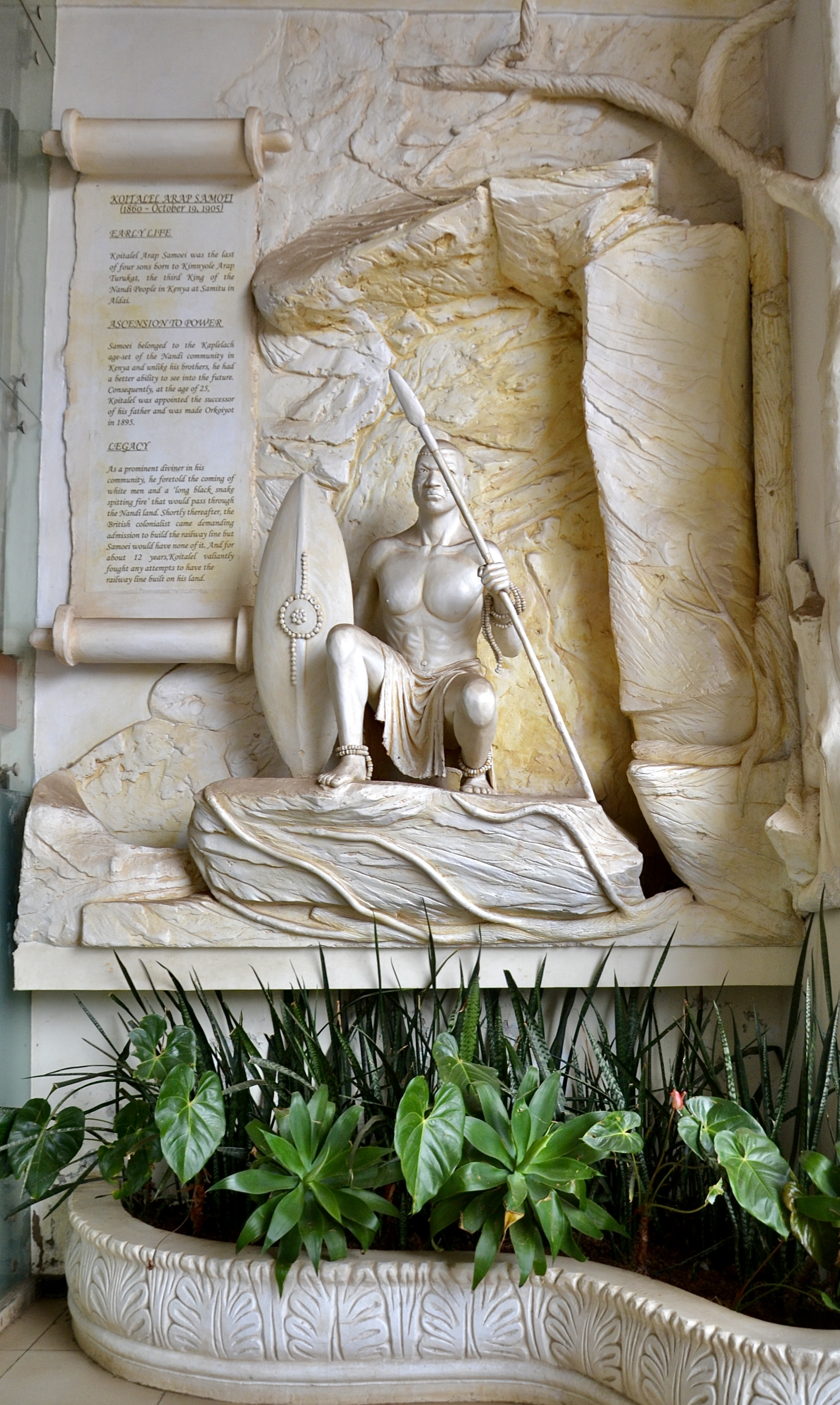
- Sculpture of Koitalel Arap Samoei in the Kenyan National Library Service building

Koitalel Arap Samoei
- In office 1890 – 19 October 1905
- Preceded by: Kimnyole arap Turukat
- Succeeded by: Kipeles arap Kimnyole (Tamasun)

Personal details
- Born: c.1860 Samitui, Aldai, Nandi County
- Died: 19 October 1905 (aged 45) Ketbarak, Nandi Hills, Kenya Colony
- As of Resistance to British Rule: (1890–1906)

The Nandi Resistance (1890–1906), also known as the Anglo-Nandi War or the Kalenjin Resistance, was a major military conflict in the Rift Valley region of present-day Kenya. It was waged by the Kalenjin people, predominantly the Nandi section, alongside the Kipsigis against British colonial occupation. This struggle represented the earliest, most prolonged, and one of the most effective military resistances against British colonial expansion in the territory that would later become "British East Africa" (the East Africa Protectorate). Lasting nearly two decades, this fierce opposition significantly delayed British efforts to establish administrative control over the Western Highlands. Nandi warriors effectively employed guerrilla warfare tactics. They frequently targeted and sabotaged the construction of the "Iron Snake" (the Uganda Railway), stealing telegraph wires and attacking supply lines.

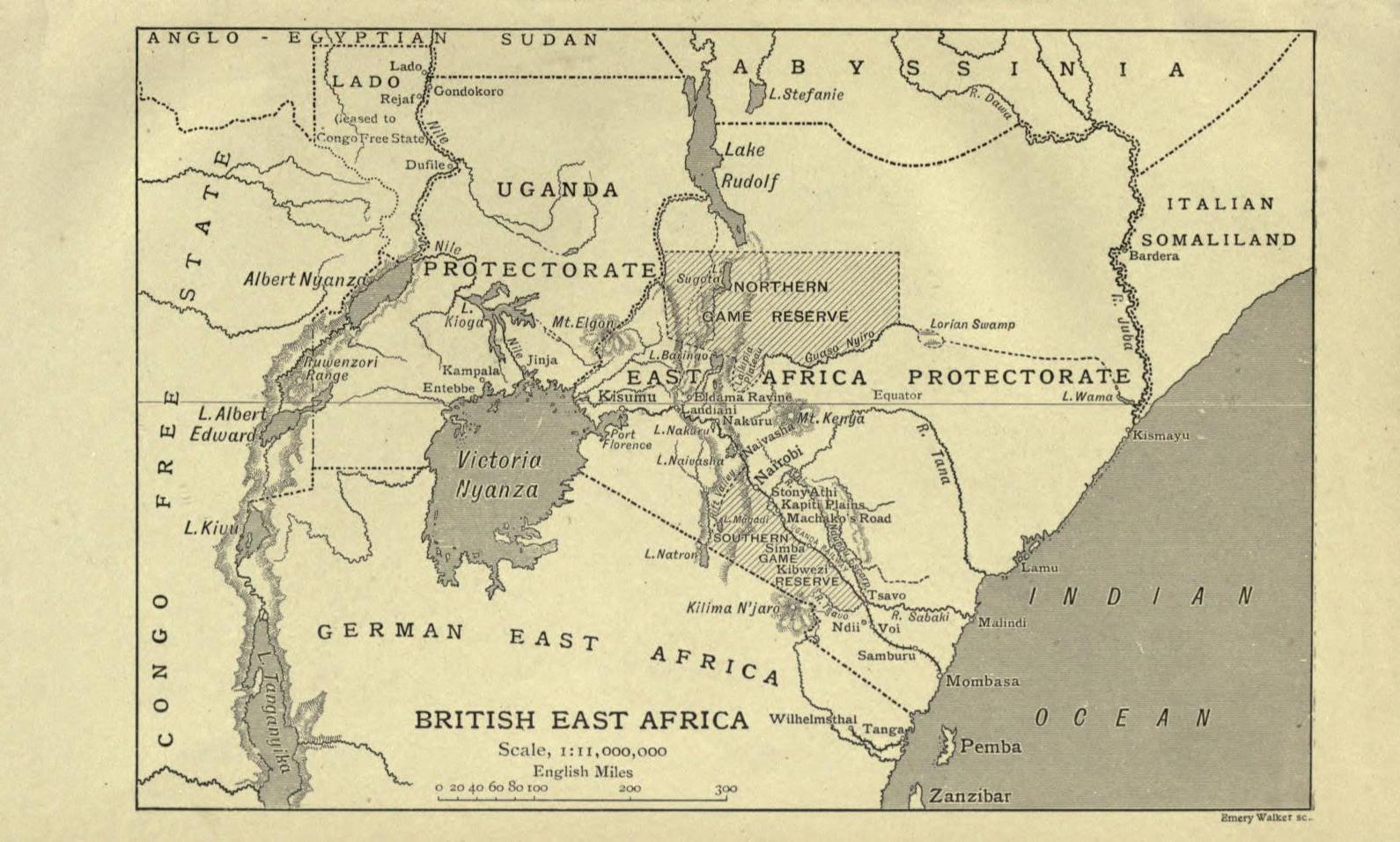
Map of British East Africa, published in 'The Man Eaters of Tsavo' (1907), by Emery Walker.

The resistance was led by the Orkoiyot (the community's spiritual and military leader), Koitalel Arap Samoei.

== Background ==
In the later decades of the 19th century, at the time when the early European explorers started advancing into the interior of Kenya, Nandi territory was a closed country. Thompson in 1883 was warned to avoid the country of the Nandi, who were known for attacks on strangers and caravans that would attempt to scale the great massif of the Mau.

Nandi suspicion was not without cause. Like many other indigenous cultures, Kalenjin prophets foretold the coming of the white man and among the Nandi, Mongo and the Orkoiyot Kimnyole's prophesies were the most notable examples. Mongo was more detailed in his account, foretelling the arrival of the white people and warning against fighting them for they were powerful. Kimnyole, before his execution only predicted that the confrontation would have a significant impact on the Nandi. Fresh with their victories against their neighboring tribes and the Arabs however, the Nandi believed that they would succeed in protecting their homelands.

Seven years after Thompson's foray, only three small European caravans including his, had entered Nandi but no significant contact had been made. The only solid information was gathered from the Maasai who Hannington related regarded the Nandi tribe "to be the most difficult to deal with for its fighting powers".

== Cause ==
Matson, in his account of the resistance, shows "how the irresponsible actions of two British traders, Andrew Dick and Peter West, quickly upset the precarious modus vivendi between the Nandi and incoming British". This would lead to more than a decade of conflict.

The war began in an unlikely fashion. West, an alleged gun-runner who has been described in historical literature as a "continual drunk", arrived at Mumias on 20 March 1895 and soon got into partnership with Dick, a "choleric" trader who had set up trading posts from the coast to Lake Victoria. Their intention was to independently establish domination and a trade monopoly with the Nandi.

Their escapade, which they began on 23 June 1895 by organizing two caravans, started off poorly. Dick had three rifles taken by the Kilekwa while one of West's men was murdered. Dick had two Nandi warriors who had surrendered whipped and later bound and drowned. A Nandi reconnaissance party was also fired upon by Dick and dispersed after losing one warrior.

West's unprotected camp of fifty individuals, twenty-five head of cattle and forty six sheep and goats had occupied the unprotected camp in safety for twenty days. West's death can only be attributed to his partner being A.Dick.

— Dennis Bishop

While Dick was busy antagonizing the Nandi, West had pitched his camp two hours from the nearest Nandi houses and from here he unsuccessfully attempted to negotiate for ivory that he sought upon his first contact with the Nandi. Although warned of the Nandi, West persisted in his attempts to negotiate by treating the Nandi delegates well. His efforts were repaid at 2:00AM on the morning of 16 July 1895 when the camp was rushed by Nandi warriors and all but eight of the expedition were killed without a shot being fired. West's last words were reported as, "Give me my gun."

== Military operations ==
The East Africa Protectorate, Foreign Office, and missionary societies administrations reacted to West's death by organizing military expeditions against the Nandi in 1895 and 1897. The first expedition in 1895 consisted of 400 askari soldiers led by European officers and armed with rifles and a Maxim machine gun. The second expedition in 1897 included 500 askari soldiers with the same armaments as before. These expeditions were able to inflict sporadic losses upon Nandi warriors, burning several Nandi villages and capturing of hundreds of livestock, but proved unable to fully suppress Nandi resistance.

== 1900 - Third invasion ==
=== Background ===
For the Nandi, the closing decade of the nineteenth century opened with the execution of Kimnyole on a variety of charges followed by a struggle for power between his sons. The [Orkoiyot] had by now gained prominence as an institution and this struggle for power split the society into factions, and conflict broke out though did not extend to full-fledge civil war. This period also saw a deepening of the 1890s epizootics crisis and the wider mutai it had generated.

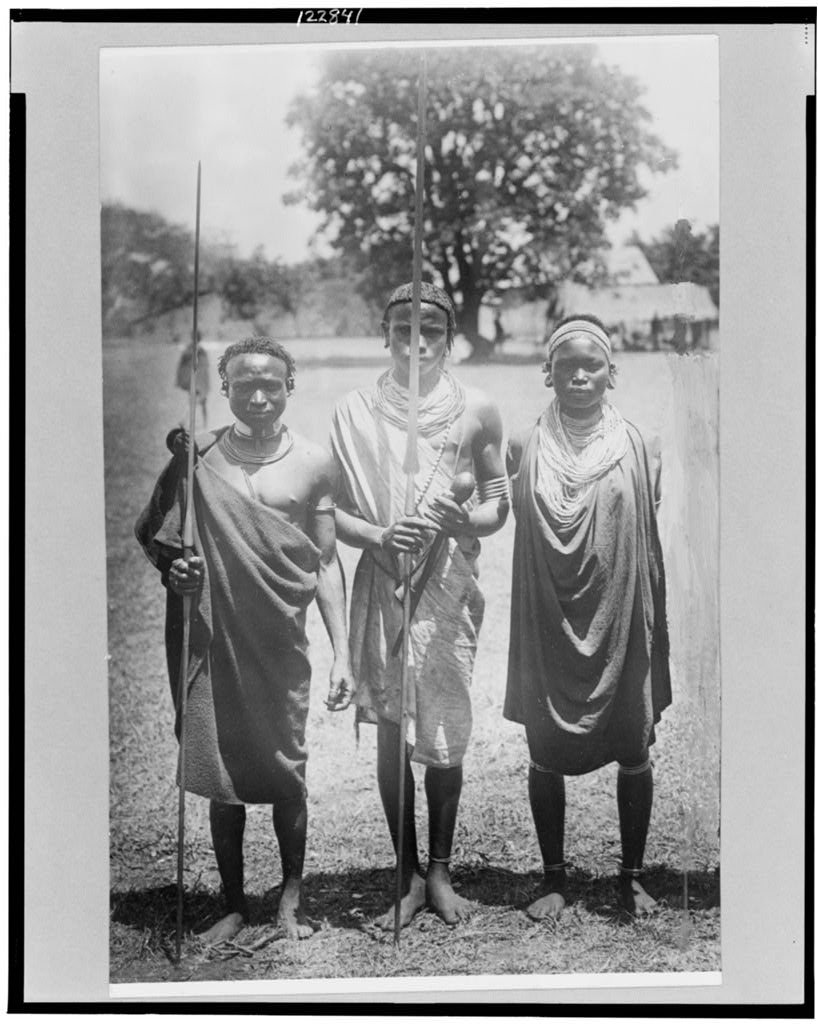
Three Nandi warriors. The 19th century saw wide annihilation and assimilation of many identities

British accounts of the invasion note that the two previous expeditions against the Nandi had been unable to bring about Nandi recognition of the establishment of British colonial rule that was then coming into force. They note that raids on the Uasin Gishu Maasai and their nearby tribes were frequent, and that mail runners and isolated stragglers from caravans were still attacked and murdered. Several askaris of the Ugandan Rifles are noted to have been killed and their rifles taken. The British perception, then as captured by, C.W. Hobley the sub-commissioner of the district was that "The Wanandi, with the exception of a few in the vicinity of the station, have all along viewed our presence in the country with veiled repugnance...we were unwittingly living on the edge of a volcano.".

In late 1899, Colonel Coles carried out brief retaliatory measures and took a number of sheep and goats. Reports indicate that as works continued on the railway line, thefts of ironwork, telegraph wire and stores of all descriptions from unguarded construction camps increased. The area most affected is said to have been in the Nyando Valley, between Molo and Kisumu.

It is noted that a telegraph wire was cut in March 1900 and that in May, a telegraph office located at a place known as Kitoto's was raided. Further, Nandi warriors are recorded to have made a number of attacks on bridge-building parties, on caravans and on Protectorate military patrols. The sub-commissioner subsequently appealed for more troops.

=== Preparations ===
At the time, Nandi was garrisoned by the Protectorates Nos. 7 and 14 companies. They were joined on 3 July 1900 by a company of the Indian contingent and No. 13 Company Uganda Rifles who arrived at Kisumu. Evatt entered Nandi with his troops on 5 July and they were joined by other divisions as the scale of operations grew.

- 14 August No.15 Company from Lumbwa
- 23 August; about 300 Maasai auxiliaries
- 25 September; half of No.10 Company from Fort Portal
- 13 October; half No.4 Company from Masindi
- 17 October; half No. 3 Company from Buddu

It is presently unknown what the Nandi order if any was.

=== Conflict ===
The Nandi pursued asymmetric warfare, keeping away from direct conflict while killing isolated parties and stragglers.

It is reported that the conflict began almost as soon as Evatt entered Nandi. His porters are recorded to have been attacked while watering at a stream and that on 7 July, five askaris from Bushiri post were killed while escorting mail.

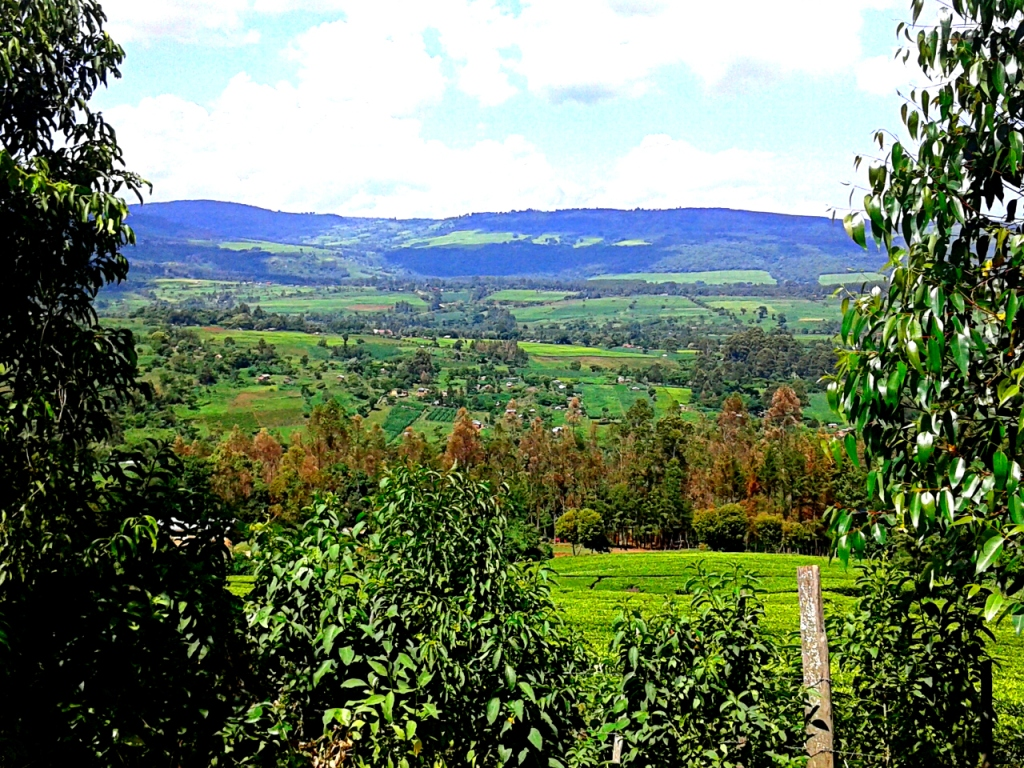
Nandi topography

Further encounters are recorded in early August when an escort party of 20 Sudanese was annihilated while accompanying the dawn mail to Fort Ternan. At the time, this was a new military post that had been established by Coles in 1898.

After Maasai auxiliaries joined his camp, Evatt adopted a plan of concentrating a column at Nandi fort or some other central camp while carrying out cattle raids of two or three days duration. During September, the wooded hills and valleys of Nandi county were traversed from east to west in a series of raids by small mobile columns of about 40 rifles, assisted by 100 spear-men who acted as a screen and often surprised the Nandi by their skillful approach.

By late September 1900, five officers and 296 men had become available as escorts for the British forces. Evatt received news of the whereabouts of Kipeles and Koitalel, the two Nandi leaders primarily responsible for the resistance and decided to attack before they could escape.

On the night of 12 October, two columns left the camp. The first under Colour-Sergent James Ellison, R.M.L.I marched east over the Nyando river, attacked a 'boma' (i.e ñganaset) early the following day, inflicted severe losses on the Nandi and returned to camp before nightfall.

At 4 a.m on 13 October, the second column, commanded by Evatt, surrounded and captured Kipeles 'boma' killing six Nandi. At 1 p.m that day, he camped with his captures; 700-800 cattle and about 3,000 sheep and goats. According to some reports, his troops were tired and did not complete their boma, other reports note that there was not enough bush available to do so.

About 9:30 p.m. on 13 October, on making his rounds Evatt is noted to have ordered all camp fires to be extinguished. Shortly afterwards one of these smoldering campfires was suddenly blown into a blaze, and simultaneously Nandi warriors attacked the camp in three parties. The British brought a Maxim gun into action, dispersing the Nandi who managed to recover half of the captured cattle. The operation led to losses of ten askaris, one officer and eighteen wounded on the British side.

=== Outcome ===
The operations of the two columns cost the Nandi 74 men killed, 1,039 head of cattle and 3,100 sheep and goats. The total casualties of the operations, including police and auxiliaries, were 103 killed, four died of wounds and 111 wounded of whom 44 killed and 38 wounded came from the military forces engaged.

=== Reaction ===
The British Foreign Office, expressed criticism on the ground that some regular forces in the Nandi area had been replaced by Maasai irregulars.

== End of Conflict ==
On 19 October 1905, on the grounds of what is now Nandi Bears Club, Arap Samoei was asked to meet Col Richard Meinertzhagen for a truce. Instead, Meinertzhagen killed Koitalel and his entourage was killed by an armed party which had accompanied Meinertzhagen. Sosten Saina, grand-nephew of one of Arap Samoei's bodyguards notes that "There were about 22 of them who went for a meeting with the ‘mzungu’ that day. Koitalel Arap Samoei had been advised not to shake hands because if he did, that would give him away as the leader. But he extended his hand and was shot immediately".

== See also ==
- History of the Kalenjin people
- Koitalel Arap Samoei
- Kalenjin languages
- Kalenjin culture
- List of rulers of the Nandi
