= Kamuratanet =

Kalenjin social tradition

Kamuratanet is a Kalenjin traditional process of teaching its members appropriate behavior, knowledge, skills, attitudes, virtues, religion and moral standards. Kamuratanet provides parameters that are used to determine what is acceptable and normal and what is not acceptable, and therefore abnormal. Though carried out throughout an individual's lifetime, it is formalized during yatitaet (circumcision) and subsequent tumdo (initiation).

== Objectives ==
Dr. Chemitei's (2018) conceptual model identifies ten virtues that the content of kamuratanet seeks to inculcate, these are;

1. Kipong'omnon (wisdom) - to inculcate a sense of wisdom
2. Luget (lit. raid i.e. survival skills) - to equip its learners with skills for survival
3. Nyingan (courage) - to instill courage
4. Rip Bororiet (lit. guard (protect) community) - to instill a sense of responsibility
5. Korip atepto (teach behavior) - to set behavioral standards
6. Ateptap chii (to specify roles) - to specify the gender roles
7. tegis chi neoo (respect for elders) - to encourage obedience
8. Konet ng'otutik (teaching rules) - to state the rules on conduct
9. Korurewek, koek lakwa chii neoo (to initiate from childhood to adulthood) - To initiate i.e. transition from childhood to adulthood
10. Chupisio, si kerip atep (curses to regulate behavior) - To regulate the behavior of members

== Early learning ==
The home, the family and by extension the oret (clan) are the primary units for educating children in Kalenjin standards of individual behavior and gender roles. Within the home parents, relatives (tilionutik) and oret members, serve as tutors for children. Parents are the primary teachers of their children and where young children misbehave subsequently, the mother and the father deal with the matter. The extended family in turn moderates the behavior of its members - both children and adults.

== Yatitaet (circumcision) ==
Yatitaet is the Kalenjin term for circumcision. It is accompanied by seclusion where rituals are preferred based on kamuratanet standards.

== Menjo (seclusion) ==
Teaching and instruction is carried out at menjo by age-mates, young warriors, the motirenik and by some elders.

=== Motirenik ===
Motirenik serve as ritual leaders at menjo and are only sought from respectable families and clans. More so in the past, appointment as Motiriot was a prestigious and coveted source of pride for one's oret and community.

== Tumdo (initiation) ==
The word for the initiation process is Tumdo deriving from the Kalenjin word for rituals (Tumdo, pl. Tumwek), in this case those specifically performed during initiation.

=== Kaandaet ===
Special songs known as kaandaet are sung during initiation. These songs serve to give instruction, to teach, to make the initiates relax after a hard day and also as an oath of secrecy and allegiance. They are usually taught by age-mates and young warriors and once mastered are sung three times daily between meals.

=== Karureiwek ===
Karureiwek are special teachings only carried out in seclusion. The English equivalent word is “ripeners” implying ripening the initiates so that they can become adults.

=== Controversy ===
In 2017, politicians Jackson Mandago and Alfred Keter led hundreds of youth in performing a tumdo (ritual) known as Cheptilet in public on the streets of Eldoret in protest against the alleged rigging of the Jubilee Party nominations. Video clips of the ritual went viral on social media causing panic among residents of the town.

This act was subsequently widely condemned by various members the Kalenjin community - among them fellow politicians such as Bundotich Kiprop alias Buzeki who stated that "It was embarrassing and unacceptable within the Kalenjin community to do such a cultural ritual publicly on the streets...”. It was also condemned by Kalenjin elders, notably Mzee Kibet Maswai, who said that performing the ritual in such a manner is an abomination. “These young people got it all wrong and as elders we were caught by surprise and we have asked the leaders involved to desist from ever doing it that way again” he said.

=== Alternative methods ===
Various efforts have been made in contemporary times to develop modern approaches to Tumdo in particular and Kamuratanet in general. Three broad directions of development are; modern approaches where Yatiataet is organised on Kamuratanet standards but embracing modern standards of hygiene, Christian oriented learning models known as Tumdo ne leel and FGM eradication programs also based on Christian principles and known as Tumdo ne leel.

== Tumdo ne leel ==
Generally the term Tumdo ne leel (lit. the ritual that is pure) refers to Christian-based learning models that teach the principles of Kamuratanet.

The Government of Kenya initiated an FGM eradication program in 1997 that sought to provide an alternative rite of passage that excluded the 'cut'. This approach was adapted and introduced to Keiyo in 2003 under the name Tumdo ne leel primarily under the aegis of Dr Susan Chebet.

== Behavior regulation ==
Good behavior is referred to as Tagurnatet and inculcating this is the ultimate purpose of Kamuratanet. Behavior that deviated from the acceptable order was referred to as – Sogornatet, a distasteful and derogatory term for deviant. The Kalenijn hate to be sogoran or to be referred to in such distasteful terms. In fact ill behavior is perceived as an embarrassment to Kalenjin pride and is severely dealt with.

=== Home & family ===
Responsibility for a child's tuition lies with the parents. Failure to tuition a child properly was traditionally punishable by vilification of parents. When a child's misbehavior came to the attention of the neighbors and the parents were found to be culpable or irresponsible in their parenting style, they were punished and could be forced to go through re-initiation in the next yatitaet season. The parents were therefore obligated to check the behavior of their children, not only at the behest of their pride, but also for the continuity of the oret (clan) and the community.

=== Oret ===
Connected to the family is the oret which according to kamuratanet defines people better than families. Traditionally, the oret played a supervisory role in the management and regulation of the behavior of its members. Ortinuek ensured that their members portrayed behaviors that were in keeping with kamuratanet. Oret members therefore took keen interest in the shaping the behavior and training of their youth.

=== Ipinda ===
In the traditional setting, individuals bore and contributed to the praise names of their ibinwek in addition to their individual praise names. Thus the ibinwek provided self-regulating mechanisms as each member tried to ensure that their age-grade and age-set was viewed and remembered positively. The Nandi chonginek of the last Sawe age-set for example are still remembered by their praise name Mararma for their defeat of the Arab traders in the 1850s. Conversely, the Kipsigis and Nandi, Kipkoiimet and Korongoro age-sets of the prior cycle were wiped out in war, and as a result their entire age-sets were erased from the cycle of ibinwek, such that unlike other Kalenjin these communities currently only have seven age-sets

Ibinwek also played a role in early education of kamuratanet. Where a child‟s misbehavior came to the attention of the neighbors, men and women of the parent‟s siritiet (age grade) summoned the father or mother respectively for questioning regarding the child‟s misbehaviour. Warnings were issued for the unbecoming or "unkalenjin" behavior to be corrected.

=== Community ===
The community plays a significant role in ensuring adherence to behavioral standards set by kamuratanet and especially so in the raising of children.

Traditionally, children were not considered to belong only to their respective parents, but rather belonged to the extended family, the oret and the community as well. Indeed, within the orthodox kamuratanet context, parents are only custodians of children on behalf of the community.

=== Spirituality ===
Specific to orthodox Tumdo, various forms of curses and blessings were instituted to regulate behavior. Indeed, good behavior was not optional but mandatory in kamuratanet. Further, language was also loaded with distasteful terms to describe people who misbehaved. In addition, it was believed that one who misbehaved would be confronted by bad omen (ng’oki). Such strategies made anyone contemplating misbehavior to take caution.
