= Ibinda (age set) =

According to the Kalenjin social system, the male sex is divided into boys, warriors and elders. The female sex is divided into girls and married women. The first stage began at birth and continued till initiation.

All boys who were circumcised together are said to belong to the same piinta. These age sets played a significant role in traditional Kalenjin society since they were used to record time. Once the young men of a particular Piinta came of age, they were tasked with protecting the tribal lands and the society, the period when they were in charge of protection of the society was known as the age of that Piinta. There were eight ages in general though this varied between sections as an age-set would temporarily be dropped from use if a disastrous incident occurred during the age of the ibinda. Within each age set, the initiates were further bundled into a siritiet. which can be understood as a 'team'.

The age of an ipinda sometimes acquired a nickname based on a defining event occurring during their time.

== Age set Names ==
Sabaot (Sapiiny)	Maina	Chumo	Sowe	Korongoro	Kwoimet	Kapleelach	Nyikeew	Nyoongi
Sabaot (Koony)	Maina	Chumo	Sawe	Korongoro	Kipkooimet	Kapleelach	Kimnyikeew	Nyoongi
Sabaot (Book)	Sawe	Maina	Gabaiyak	Korongoro	?*	Gamnenac	Gamnyikewa	Nyongiik
Nandi	Maina	Chumo	Sawe	–	Kipkoiimet	Kaplelach	Kimnyigei	Nyongi
Kipsigis	Maina	Chumo	Sawe	Korongoro	–	Kaplelach	Kimnyigei	Nyongi
Keiyo	Maina	Chumo	Sowe	Korongoro	Kipkoimet	Kaplelach	Kimnyegeu	Nyongi
Marakwet	Maina	Chumo	Sowe	Korongoro/ Kipkoimet	Kaberur	Kaplelach	Kimnyigeu	Nyongi
Tugen & Lembus	–	Chumo	Sowe	Korongoro	Kipkoimet	Kaplelach	Kimnikeu	Nyongi
Pokot	Maina	Juma	Sowe	Korongoro	Kipkoimet	Kaplelach	Merkutua	Nyongu

– *La Fontaine states there are eight "age classes" but lists seven names, the order of which is questionable.

== Marakwet ==
There are corresponding female age-sets among the Marakwet; for example, Kaberur (male) – Chemeri/ Chemeri Kipchesum (female), Kaplelach (male)- Tabesit / Tabesit Ruompo Laikok (female), Kipnyikew/ Kipmke (male)- Silingwa (female), Nyongi (male)- Kaptura (female), Maina (male) – Charkina (female), Chumo (male) – Kipturbei (female), Sowe (male)- Chelyong/ Kapcheusi (female), Korongoro (male)- Cheptentur/ Sikinkin/ Kesengen (female). The Marakwet used to circumcise girls alongside boys. However, the naming of female age-sets changes according to prevailing events.

== Nandi ==
Historically, the Nandi had eight cyclical age-sets or ibinwek, however they dropped one for a total of seven. Legend has it that the members of this ibinda were wiped out in war. For fear of a recurrence, the community decided to retire the age-set.

The order of Nandi ibinwek is given below.

- Maina
- Chumo
- Sawe
- Kipkoimet
- Kaplelach
- Kipnyigei
- Nyongi

=== Age sub-set (siritiet) ===
In each age-set, the initiates were bundled into siritiet or what can be understood as a 'team'. There are four 'teams' or siritoik in an ibinda namely:

- Chongin
- Kiptaito
- Tetagaat (literally cow's neck)
- Kiptaruiyeek - Kiptoiinik (literally young calves)
