= Barsirian Arap Manyei =

Kenyan political prisoner (1894–1974)

Barsirian Arap Manyei (c. 1894 – 10 April 1974) was the last widely recognized Nandi Orkoiyot and Kenya's longest serving political detainee.

== Early life ==
Barsirian was born to Koitalel arap Samoei in 1894 in Samitui, part of present Aldai, Nandi County. He was the second born son of Koitalel's second wife, Taparchok Chepo Chebwai. His elder brother was known as Surtan Lelimo Arap Samoei and he had three sisters known as Titau, Kopot Kiboor and Kopot Chepo Siror.

Barsirian was inducted into the Nyongi age-set after going through the rite of passage.

=== Father's assassination ===
Barsirian's father, Koitalel arap Samoei, was assassinated on 19 October 1905. The colonial administration subsequently set about banishing, detaining or killing his brothers and sons.

Kibeles was installed as Nandi Orkoiyot by the protectorate administration following the 'Muhoroni Conference' in 1909 though he would die shortly after in July, 1912.

Following Kibeles death, the Nandi convinced the protectorate administration to appoint Lelimo arap Samoei as heir to his father's office. However, it is reported that the administration sought an informant in Lelimo's court and found one in one of his bodyguards a short while later. Lelimo subsequently found out about this and put the bodyguard to death following which he went into hiding.

== Orkoiyot of Nandi: 1919–1923 ==
Barsirian Arap Manyei took over the reign as the Supreme Chief (Orkoiyot) of the Nandi in 1919.

=== Nandi Protest ===
A number of factors taking place in the early 1920s led to what has come to be termed the Nandi Protest or Uprisings of 1923. It was the first expression of organized resistance by the Nandi since the wars of 1905–06.

A number of factors contributed to the unrest, chief among them; the land alienation of 1920 and a steep increase in taxation, taxation tripled between 1909 and 1920 and because of a change in collection date, two taxes were collected in 1921. Additionally, due to fears of a spread of rinderpest following an outbreak, a stock quarantine was imposed on the Nandi Reserve between 1921 and 1923. The Nandi, prevented from selling stock outside the Reserve, had no cash to pay taxes. The labour conscription that took place under the Northey circulars added to the bitterness against the colonial government.

By 1923, when the saget ap eito (sacrifice of the ox) was to take place, these factors had been contributing to a buildup of antagonism and unrest toward the government for three years. The historically significant ceremony where leadership of the community was transferred between generations had always been followed by an increased rate of cattle raiding as the now formally recognized warrior age-set sought to prove its prowess. The approach to a saget ap eito thus witnessed expressions of military fervor and for the ceremony all Nandi males would gather in one place.

Alarmed at the prospect, the colonial government came to believe that Barsirian was planning to use the occasion of the Saget ab eito as a cover under which to gather forces for a massive military uprising. On 16 October 1923, several days before the scheduled date for the saget ap eito, Barsirian Arap Manyei and four other elders were arrested and deported to Meru. Permission to hold the ceremony was subsequently withdrawn and it did not take place.

== Detention ==
Barsirian Arap Manyei was detained from 1923 to 1964 making him Kenya's longest serving political prisoner. He was detained at Meru, Mfangano Island and in Kapsabet.

== Life after detention ==
Multiple reports suggest that Barsirian Arap Manyei spent his life after detention in penury. It is recorded for instance that on 25 November 1970, William Morogo Arap Saina, a then Kenyan member of parliament asked in that body, what action the Government would take to help Barsirian "whose age was approaching 90 years, and who had a large family who were all squatters".

== Death ==
Barsirian Arap Manyei died on 10 April 1974. He was buried at his wife's (Taplelei) home at Lemoru Ngeny village in Uasin Gishu County.

== See also ==
- Kenya colony
- Kalenjin people
- Nandi resistance
