= Orkoiyot =

Kenyan military group

The orkoiyot (plural orkoiik or orkoiyots) occupied a sacred and special role within the Nandi and Kipsigis people of Kenya. He held the dual roles of King spiritual and military leader, and had the authority to make decisions regarding security particularly the waging of war. Notable Orkoiik include Kimnyole Arap Turukat, Koitalel Arap Samoei and Barsirian Arap Manyei.

== Etymology ==
The origin of the word is unknown though Huntingford (1927) speculates that the word orkoiyot derives from two words "ooo" (big ) and "koot"(house) hence the big house. It's also speculated that it means 'or,' signifying 'road' or 'way,' and 'koi' denotes 'long,' thus translating to 'long road/way.'

The word predates the office it would represent among the Nandi as evinced by its presence in other Kalenjin communities e.g. Kony (orkōan, orkōandet) and Suk (werkoiyon). It was originally applied to a class of wizards who were perceived to be of a benevolent nature and were thus tolerated and were distinct from ponik, a class of wizards who were perceived to only be evil. Huntingford (1972) notes that the men-folk of the Kamwaike oret were the traditional orkoiik in Nandi before the Masai family of Kapuso took the pre-eminence from them.

== History ==
=== Origins ===
The office that the Orkoiyot held was referred to as the Orkoinotet and was established among the Nandi by Kipsegun, a Segelai Maasai. The abilities that distinguished an Orkoiyot were hereditary and thus the office passed on to his son Arap Kipsegun though their dynasty was short-lived and ended with the son.

The second dynasty was founded through a woman named Moki chebo Cheplabot, the wife of a Maasai Laibon who fled during a war with the Nandi while pregnant. She later bore two sons, Kopokoii and Barsapotwa, while hiding in caves near Keben in the Mogobich Valley. Moki and her sons, the former who would become the first Orkoiyot of the second and last dynasty, were captured and adopted into the Talai clan. The Talai are a widespread Kalenjin clan and among the Nandi are aligned with the Lion Totem.

=== Genealogical table ===
The Orkoinotet lasted for over fifty years and went through a period of a dual administration during the time of Arap Kipsegun and Kopokoii until the former was ousted.

Kipsegun; 1st Nandi Orkoiyot, unknown
Arap Kipsegun; 2nd Nandi Orkoiyot, unknown	Kopokoii; 2nd Nandi Orkoiyot, unknown
Turukat; 3rd Nandi Orkoiyot, unknown
Kimnyole; 4th Nandi Okoiyot, 1870s to 1890, killed by Nandi in 1890
Kipeles Arap Kipchomber; 1st Kipsigis Orkoiyot	Koitalel; 5th Nandi Orkoiyot, 1890 to 1905
Kipeles Arap Tamasun; 6th Nandi Orkoiyot, 1905 to 1919
Barsirian Arap Manyei; 7th Nandi Orkoiyot, 1919 to 1922

== Administrative structure of the Nandi ==
The Orkoiik were recognized across Nandi as being at the head of the governance system. They did not however play a large role in the affairs of everyday life; which were handled by the Kiruogik, heads of the districts and direct representatives of the people.

=== Kiruogik ===
The Kiruogindet (pl. Kiruogik) was spokesman or counselor chosen by the people in each district (pororiet). They were responsible to the Orkoiyot through the Maotiot for the good governance of their respective districts and the enrollment of troops in time of war.

=== Maotik ===
The Orkoiyot appointed one Maotiot (pl. Maotik) in each district to represent the Orkoiyot at the district level.

== See also ==
- List of rulers of the Nandi
- Kimnyole
