= Kimnyole =

Nandi Orkoiyot prophet

Kimnyole Arap Turkat (c.1840s -1890) was the Nandi Orkoiyot who predicted the arrival of Europeans ("the white tribe") and the railways ("the Iron Snake"); two events that were to forever alter the history of the Nandi.

He is noted for the prophesies he made and is famous for being the father of Koitalel Arap Samoei, the leader of the Nandi Resistance. He was also the father of Kipchomber Arap Koilege, the first Kipsigis Orkoioyot, and grandfather of Barsirian Arap Manyei, Kenya's longest serving political detainee.

== Early life ==
Kimnyole was born to Talai Arap Turukat, the third Nandi Orkoiyot. He belonged to the Sawe age-set group of the Nandi.

== Reconquest of Uasin Gishu ==
During Kimnyole's reign, internecine conflicts of the 1870s and 80s between the various Maasai factions saw the routing of the Uasin Gishu Maasai by a combined force of the Naivasha and Laikipia Maasai. The Nandi then defeated the remnants of the Uasin Gishu at a battle in the Kipkaren Valley, as the Maasai had tried to re-assert their claim to the plateau.

Shortly after, the Laikipiak were defeated by the Naivasha such that the latter were left as the only military power strong enough to contest the grazing rights to the Uasin Gishu plateau with the rising Nandi.

Several inconclusive skirmishes took place between the two until eventually, the Naivasha were routed at Ziwa and chased back into the Rift Valley. Thus the Nandi had unchallenged access to the pastures and salt licks throughout the vast Uasin Gishu plateau. Cattle and captives swelled the Nandi animal and human populations.

== Kimnyole's death ==
Trouble began for Kimnyole in the late 1880s, starting about 1888, when disaster struck the Nandi in the form of rinderpest cattle disease which was spreading round Kenya at this time.

Kimnyole was blamed for not having warned the warriors who went out to raid and brought back rinderpest infected cattle. It was noted that only his cattle had not died. He was also accused of sanctioning a combined raid of Nandi bororiosiek that had resulted in disaster when large numbers of Nandi warriors were killed.

Kimnyole Arap Turukat was thus sentenced to death in 1890 and was stoned to death by representatives of some bororiosiek.

== Succession ==
Kimnyole's death led to a succession dispute between his two sons; Koitalel Arap Samoei and Kipchomber Arap Koilege. Factions formed around the two aspirants and minor skirmishes took place between their supporters but this did not extend to full-scale war. The dispute ended with the defeat of Kipchomber Arap Koilege in 1895, after which he fled to the Kipsigis with his supporters, becoming the first Kipsigis Orgoiyot.
