= Nandi Hills, Kenya =

Nandi Hills
- Location in Kenya
- Coordinates: 00°06′01″N 35°10′35″E
- Country: Kenya
- County: Nandi County
- Elevation: 6,716 ft (2,047 m)

Population (2009)
  - Total: 73,626

Nandi Hills is a town and also an electoral constituency in Kenya's Nandi County. The name refers to the general area of Nandi County, where the urban settlement is located. Its current Member of Parliament is Hon. Bernard Kibor Kitur of United Democratic Alliance (UDA) party.

== Location ==
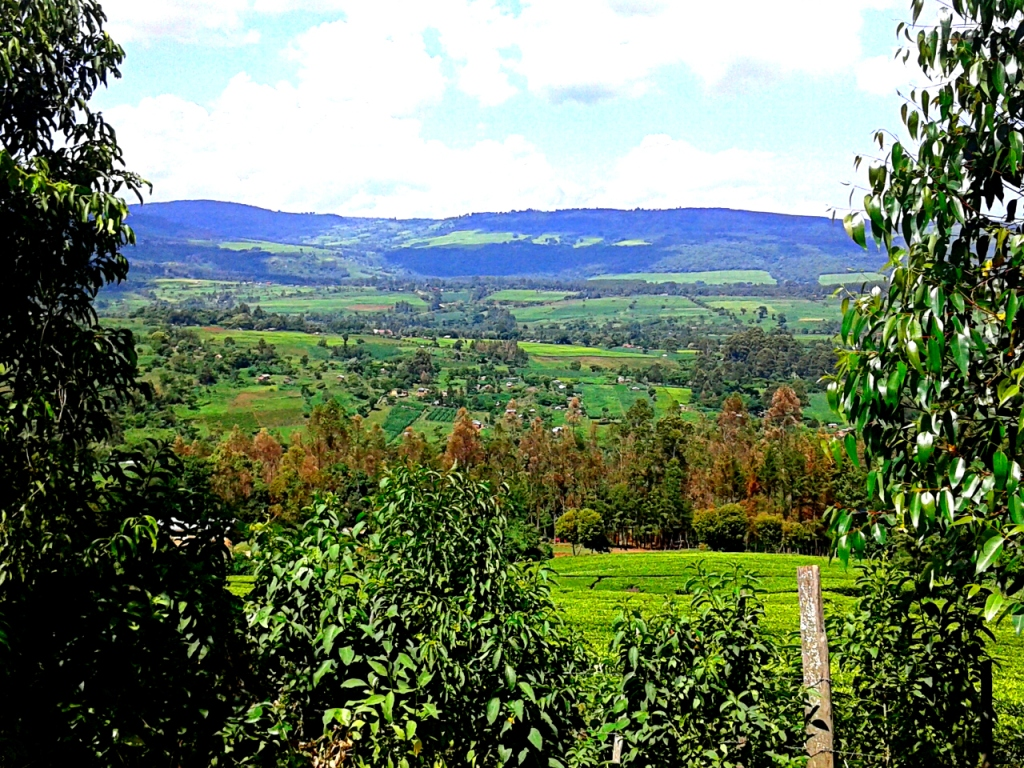
Mogobich Valley in Nandi Hills observed from Koilot Hill

Nandi Hills is located in a highland area at the edge of the Great Rift Valley in the southwestern part of Kenya. It is located approximately 303 kilometres (188 mi), by road, northwest of Nairobi, the capital and largest city in the country. The coordinates of Nandi Hills, Kenya are: 0°06'01.0"N, 35°10'35.0"E (Latitude: 0.100278; Longitude: 35.176389). Nandi Hills lies an elevation of approximately 2,047 metres (6,716 ft), above sea level.

== Overview ==
The small town named Nandi Hills, is often referred to as the "cradle land of Kenyan running". The area is home to many world-renowned athletes, including Kipchoge Keino, Wilson Kipketer, Janeth Jepkosgei, Augustine Choge, Wilfred Bungei, Henry Rono and Mike Boit. The area is mostly inhabited by the Nandi people. Nandi Hills has a cool and wet climate with two rain seasons during the equinoxes. Temperatures vary between 18 °C and 24 °C which coupled with the rich volcanic soils make the area ideal for growing tea. The scenic area is known for its many tea estates. There is also a golf course, Nandi Bears Club, where several annual tournaments are held annually such as the Gill Trophy, the Kenya Ladies' Golf Union and the prestigious Kenya Breweries Festival of Golf besides rally and cross countries.

It is a very significant area of the Rift Valley province and the Kalenjin community. It was a battleground against the Luo and Luhya communities and the burial site of the renowned Nandi seer Koitalel Arap Samoei. He is buried under a symbolic tree. On top of Nandi Hills sits Samoei with its red earth. When Koitalel was killed by British officer Richard Meinertzhagen, some believe the ground turned red on the spot of his death.

== Local economy ==
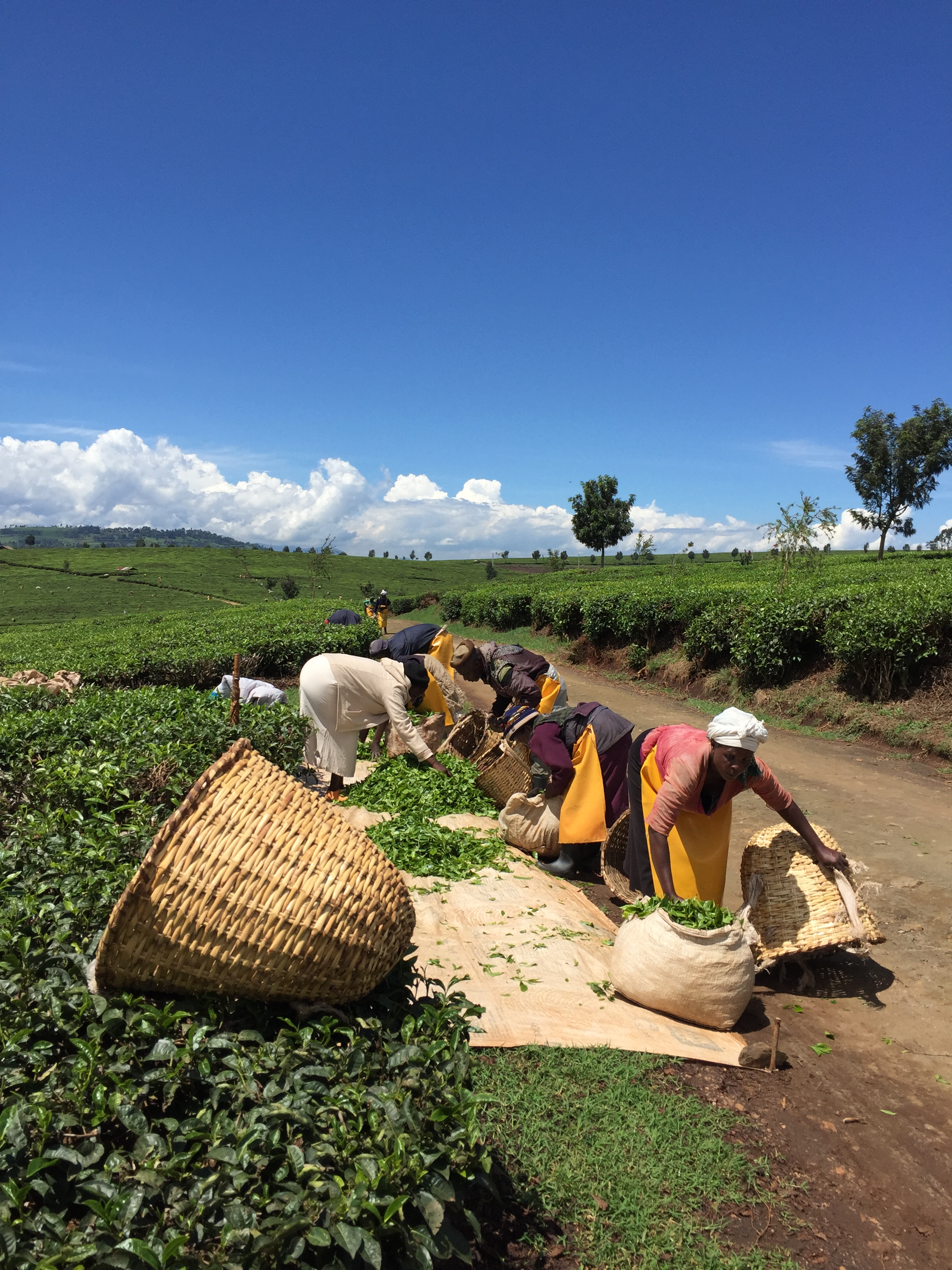
Tea picking in Nandi Hills

The economy of Nandi Hills relies mainly on the surrounding tea estates. Many people work on tea farms as pluckers, managers, field maintenance, factory service works, official duties and business. Nandi Hills town has barely a tarmac street despite a lot of taxes accrued from tea farms.

== Transportation ==
The transport system in Nandi Hills is mainly land-based via tarmac. The Nandi Hills road network connects it to major Kenyan cities including Eldoret, Nakuru, Kericho, Kisumu and, ultimately, Nairobi and Mombasa.
