= Bororiet =

A bororiet (pl., bororiosiek) was a kind of geographic division of the traditional society of the Nandi people of Kenya. It had military and political functions in addition to the territorial element. Each bororiet was made up of kokwotinwek (sing., kokwet) which were groups of homesteads within the same locality, roughly equal to a hamlet but smaller than a village. The bororosiek were, in turn, grouped into emet (pl. emotinwek) but these were only of territorial significance.

== History ==
The emet division of the Nandi and the wider Kalenjin seems to be of ancient origin. From linguistic evidence, it seems probable that the Southern Nilotes, the linguistic ancestors of the Kalenjin, organised themselves into clans or at least different clusters of associated clans – what could be called tribes – which coincided with particular territories. These "tribes" and the territory they occupied were called *e:m. The Kokwet concept and division also appears to be of ancient heritage found as it is among the other Kalenjin groups, including the Pokot society whose heritage is estimated to have separated from the main Kalenjin society more than a millennium ago.

The concept of the bororiet, however, was unique to the Nandi and is presumed to have begun sometime after the settlement in Aldai by Kakipoch and his followers. The initial settlement involved members of a number of Kalenjin clans who lived wherever they pleased, meaning that for purposes of spatial distribution the clans were of no significance. As the number of clans increased, new land was incorporated and this occupation was carried out on a bororiet basis, either through the formation of a new bororiet or the migration of offshoot sections of the original bororiet.

== Names of the Bororiosiek ==
=== Major bororiosiek ===
- Kap Chepkendi

Chebolool
Sigilaiyekab arap Kerebei
Chebiriir Katuut
Muruto (Kap lolo)

- Kap Meliilo (mi kericheek ma, gotab ndasimiet)
- Kap Taalam (Che loklokianu ak gariik, che bo ma ki kiop ko somok, che bo arap Kuna)
- Kabooch

Cheboing'ong ak lelwek
Kosach nyiim kot koles

- Kaptumoiis

=== Minor bororiosiek ===
- Koilegei (che ki sal Tabolwa, Che bo arap Manyinya)
- Kabianga
- Kapsile
- Kapno
- Cheptol
- Tibingot (Tebee ng'ot?)
- Murkaptuk
- Kap Siondoi

== Customs ==
People of the same oreet were not necessarily restricted to one bororiet, people could and still change bororiet, due to migration, without necessarily changing their oreet. However, some families were advised, perhaps to avoid recurrent catastrophes, not to live in a certain bororiet. For example, if one's family lived in one bororiet but was haunted by repetitive deaths that pointed to a curse, a ceremony reminiscent of 'Kap Kiyai' was performed to allow the family to change their bororiet by "crossing a river" in the context of ma yaitoos miat aino which literally means that death does not cross a river (body of water). This elaborate ceremony was called raret (rar means trim or cut off). A family with a name Kirorei probably indicates a case of bororiet change which came about as a result of rareet (chopping off). A case in point is the long-standing banning of Kap Matelong (and all Kipkenda?) from inhabiting Chesumei which is populated by the relatively obscure but conservative bororiosiek of Cheptol, Kapno and Tibingot.
