= Koitalel Arap Samoei =

King of the Nandi people in colonial Kenya

Orkoiyot Koitalel Arap Samoei Maotiot
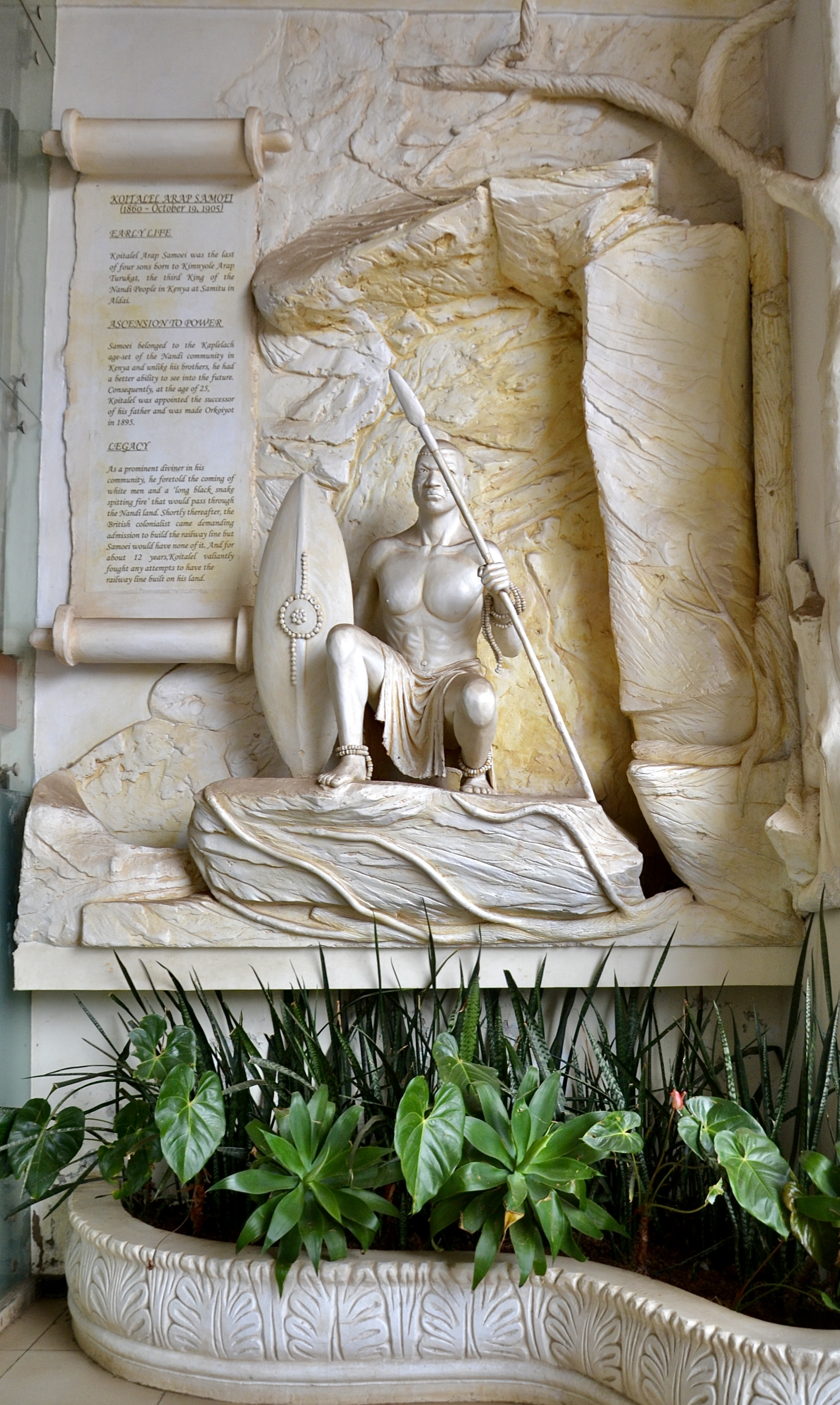
- Sculpture of Koitalel Arap Samoei in the Kenyan National Library Service building

Supreme Chief of the Nandi
- In office 1890 – 19 October 1905
- Preceded by: Kimnyole arap Turukat
- Succeeded by: Kipeles arap Kimnyole (Tamasun)

Personal details
- Born: c.1860 Samitui, Aldai, Nandi County
- Died: 19 October 1905 (aged 45) Ketbarak, Nandi Hills, Kenya Colony

Koitalel arap Samoei (c.1860 – 19 October 1905) was an Orkoiyot who led the Nandi people from 1890 until his assassination in 1905. The Orkoiyot occupied a sacred and special role within the Nandi and Kipsigis people of Kenya. He held the dual roles of chief spiritual and military leader and had the authority to make decisions regarding security matters, particularly the waging of war and negotiating for peace. Koitalel was the supreme chief of the Nandi people of Kenya. He led the Nandi resistance against British colonial rule.

== Early life ==
Koitalel Samoei was born to Kimnyole arap Turukat at Samitui in Aldai. He was the fourth of five sons (Siratei arap Simbolei was Kimnyole's youngest son) and belonged to the Kaplelach age-set group of the Nandi. he was reportedly close to his father and displayed the greatest ability in understanding prophetic signs.

Kimnyole, who is said to have predicted Koitalel's death, reportedly summoned his five sons as he saw his own death approach and asked them to consult traditional brews in a pot. Samoei, upon gazing into the pot, drew his sword in protest having perceived the coming of the Europeans.

Kimnyole sensed danger in his son's bravery and out of concern for his safety, sent Koitalel's three siblings to live among the Kipsigis, while Samoei was asked to go and live among the Tugen people.

== Ascension to Power ==
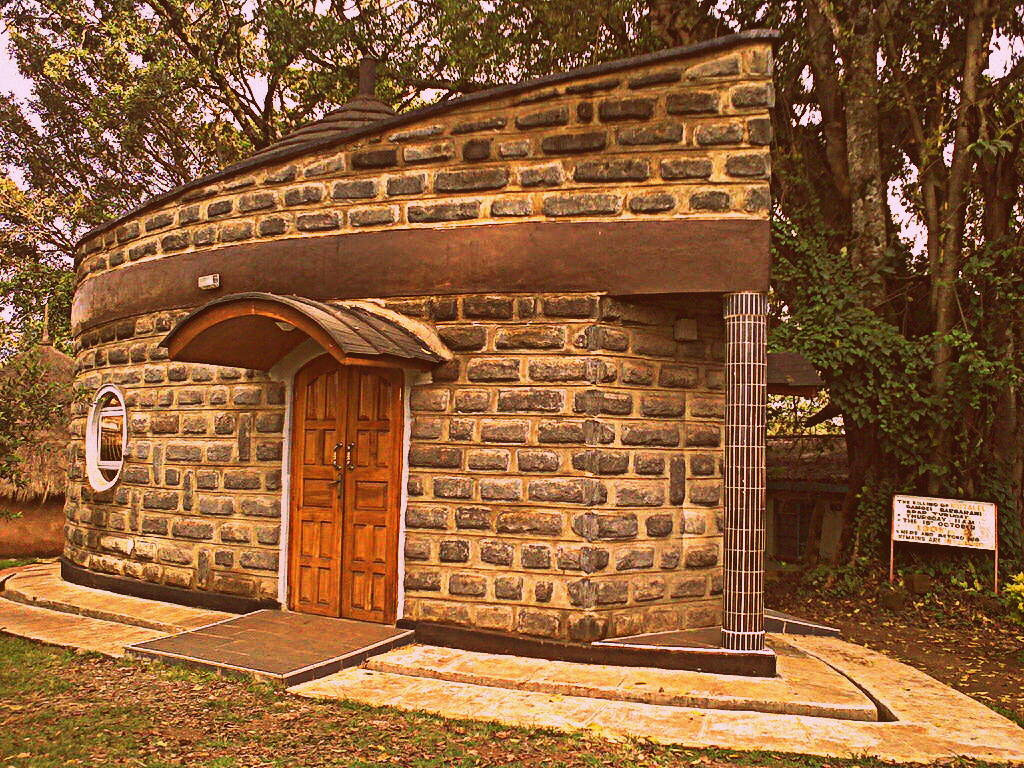
Koitalel arap Samoei Mausoleum and Museum in Nandi Hills, Kenya

After the death of Kimnyole, a faction of Nandi people sent for Koitalel who had already taken refuge among the Keiyo people. Koitalel's brother, Kipchomber arap Koilege, also laid claim to Nandi leadership, leading to a succession dispute. Factions formed around the two aspirants and minor skirmishes took place between their supporters but this did not extend to full scale war. The dispute ended with the defeat of Kipchomber Arap Koilege in 1895, after which he fled to the Kipsigis with his supporters, becoming the first Kipsigis Orgoiyot.

Koitalel was appointed successor to his father, and was made Orkoiyot in 1895.

When the British colonial government began building the Uganda Railway through the Nandi area, Koitalel led an eleven-year resistance movement against the railway.

== Assassination ==
To end the resistance, the now largely disgraced intelligence officer Richard Meinertzhagen invited Koitalel to a peace truce meeting after leading a rebellion against the colonial invasion of the Nandi. The peace meeting was to be held at 11:00AM on Thursday, October 19, 1905. Suspecting that he would be killed as his father Kimnyole had foretold, Samoei instructed Meinertzhagen to come with five companions to meet him at Ketbarak (present-day Nandi Bears Club). Samoei was to come with five foretellers.

Contrary to the agreement, Meinertzhagen marched from the fort at Kaptumo with 80 armed men, 75 of whom hid near the venue of the meeting. It is reported that when Koitalel stretched his hand to shake hands with Meinertzhagen's, he killed Koitalel with a shot at point-blank range. Afterward, it is claimed that he also decapitated Koitalel and sent some of Koitalel's body parts to England. This precipitated the end of the Nandi Resistance. Initially, Meinertzhagen was able to cover up what he had done from the colonial authorities, and was commended for the incident. However, after news of what had actually happened became known, Meinertzhagen claimed self-defence in an investigation, and eventually, after a third court of inquiry, he was cleared by the presiding officer, Brig. William Manning. Nevertheless, pressure from the Colonial Department on the War Office eventually brought about Meinertzhagen's removal from Africa.

== Succession ==
He was succeeded by his brother, Kipeles arap Kimnyole (aka Tamasun), while his son, Barsirian arap Manyei (born 1894), would later become the Nandi leader from 1919 until 1922 when he was detained by the British colonial government. Barsirian was not released until 1964, after independence, making him the longest-serving political prisoner in Kenyan history.

== Legacy ==
Koitalel has been immortalised as a national hero and a legendary leader among the Kalenjin community. A mausoleum has been built for Koitalel arap Samoei in Nandi Hills, Kenya. Construction of the Koitaleel Arap Samoei University by the national and local government in collaboration with the University of Nairobi is currently ongoing in Mosoriot and Nandi Hills, Kenya. The Koitaleel Samoei Secondary School situated in Nandi Hills town is named after him to commemorate his leadership.

== See also ==
- List of rulers of the Nandi
- Nandi Resistance
- Koitaleel Samoei University College
