= Oreet =

Kinship group among the Kalenjin people of Kenya

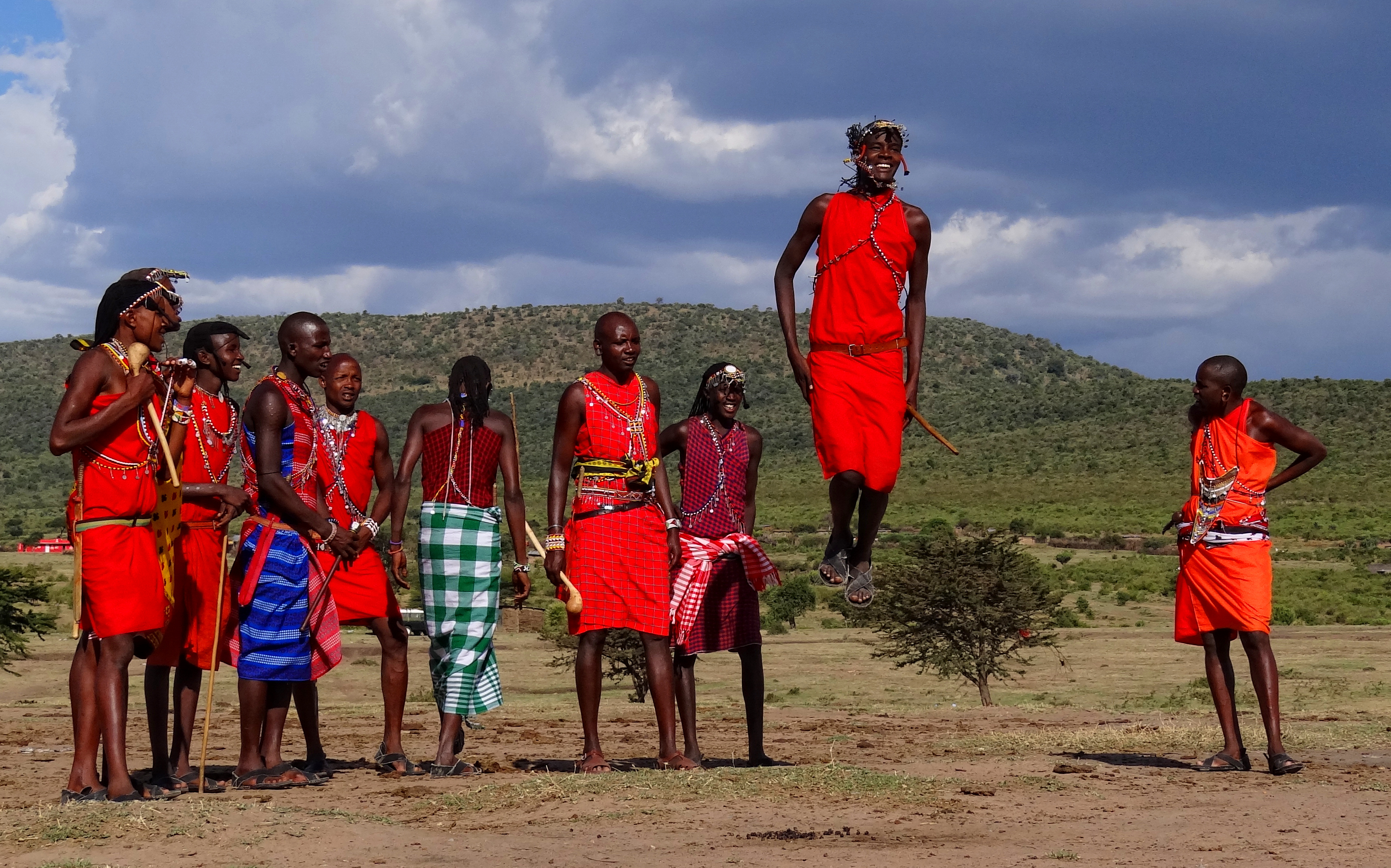
Maasai men performing a traditional jumping dance. Many Maasai were adopted into various Ortinuek during the 19th century

The Oreet (pl. Ortinuek or Ortinweek) is a kinship group among the Kalenjin people of Kenya that is similar in concept to a clan. The members of an oreet are not necessarily related by blood as evidenced by the adoption of members of the Uasin Gishu Maasai by Arap Sutek, the only Nandi smith at the time. His proteges would later be adopted into almost every other clan as smiths. More famously, the lineage of the Talai Orkoiik were adopted members of the Segelai Maasai.

== Description ==
Membership and identification by Oreet traditionally served the purpose of regulating marriage (by prevent inbreeding since marriage within Oreet was largely not permitted), arbitrating in murder cases and a support system when payment of blood money was required.

In modern Kenya, identification by oreet is declining among the Nandi and Kalenjin. However oreet histories have consequently gained prominence as a means of studying the settlement and formation of the Nandi sub-tribe of the Kalenjin. Like the wider Kalenjin Occupation of the Rift, a look at the individual Nandi clan histories shows that the narrative of origin, though containing elements of truth, largely over simplifies the formation of the Nandi sub-tribe.

== Sub-tribe ==
The Nandi sub-tribe was formed through the settlement of the Nandi region by members of various Kalenjin clans from different regions. The traditional Nandi account is that the first settlers in their country came from Elgon, and formed the Kipoiis clan, a name that possibly means 'the spirits'. They were led by a man named Kakipoch, founder of the Nandi section of the Kalenjin. They are said to have settled in the emet (county) of Aldai in south-western Nandi. Kakipoch's people were later joined by a few Kipsikis, who were then followed by people from the other Kalenjin branches.

== Settlement ==
The account of settlement by the 17 clans present in the early decades of the 20th century is as follows;

- From Elgon & Lumbwa (Kipsigis)

Kipoiis
Kipamwi
Kipkenda
Kipiegen

- From Lumbwa (Kipsigis)

Tungo
Kipaa
Kipasiso and Kapchemuri (Chemuri)
Elgoni (Kony)

- From Elgon

Kipkokos

- From Elgon & Elgeyo

Kipsirgio
Moi
Sokom
Kiptopkei
Kamwaikei

- From Lo-'sekelae Masai

Kipkoiitim (also partly from Elgon)
Talai, the medicine men's clan (partly also from Kamasya)
Toyoi

The Nandi ortinuek are each identified by an 'animal' or tiondo, which no clan member could hunt. Clan symbols (tiondo) range from birds, wild animals, frog and snake to bees. Although the sun is not an animal, 'she' has oreet and is called 'tiondo' in the same sense as a lion.

- Kipkenda Maimi

Segemiat (bee)

- Kiboiis

Lelwoot (jackal)
Solopchoot (coackroach)

- Mooi

Kong'oony (Crested Crane)
Soeet (Buffalo)
Kergeng, Cheptirkiichet (Dik-dik)
Kipkamoriet
Kogos, Chepkogosiot (Eagle *all eagles which have a white patch)

- Kipsirgoi

Toreet (palee kut ak kutung')

- Kipamui

Kergeng (Antelope)

- Sogoom

Chepsirereet (Eagle *african crowned eagle)

- Talai

Ng'etuny, Lion (Kuutwo, Talai Orkoi)
Ng'etuny, Lion (Talai Nandi)

- Kipoongoi (che kwees tibiik)

Taiyweet

- Kibiegen (kap rat setio let)

Moseet (Monkey)
Muriat (rat)

- Kipaa (koros)

Ndareet (Snake)
Tisiet (Baboon)

- Toiyoi (moriso)

Ropta (rain)
Birechik (Safari Ants)

- Kap Oiit

Beliot, kiramkeel koe mooi (Elephant)
Kipleng'wet (rabbit)
chameleon

- Kipasiiso (Kap koluu)

Asista (Sun)

- Kuchwa

Mororochet (frog)

- Tungo (korap oor)

Kimageetiet (Hyena)

- Kiptabkei

Chereret (vervet monkey)

== Notable Oreet Customs ==
It is claimed that Kong'ony (crested crane) was the first animal allocated a family. Hence Moi (Kong'ony) is regarded as the 'leader' and in child stories this is shown as the source of babies in a family.

The Hyena (Kimageet, oreet of Tungo, korap oor) is claimed to have been the last tiondo to be allocated and comes along with several rules of favour (ostensibly to hide the fact that it was the last). Hence, even though the Nandi claim 'Cheptaab oreet age ne wendi oreet age' literally 'a daughter from one clan goes to another clan and belongs in the new clan', to mean a woman has no clan, the Tungo girls are permitted to retain their clan identity.

Kiboiis is the largest clan in Nandi. It comprises two tottems ("tiondo"): Solopchot (cockroach), also known as Mende Keruus and Lelwot (jackal), which was praised as "cherotei keringet agenge en kabula" (believed to be 'ghafla'), which is Oreetab Kibois. Kibois is used largely by eight families: Kaprotuk, Kapchebwai, Kapkong'eluk, Kapkerebei, Kaptiireei, Kapcherige, Kaptot, and Kapcheptembur. Lelwek is normally praised in Kaprotuk, by their daughters but during Koito (prewedding). Solobchot is widely mentioned (less praised). Others use Lelwot interchangeably with Kaprotuk, Kapkong'eluk and Kapchebwai and regard each other as "oor mwendo". Earlier grandfathers especially from Kaprotuk were worried that the two families of Kaprotuk and Kapchebwai would "moiyo tiondo" (each will claim Lelwot is theirs) so they allowed Solopchot to be used as alternative.
