= Lumbwa =

- Location within Kenya
- Coordinates: 0.2°S 35.47°E
- Country: Kenya
- Former province: Rift Valley Province
- Present county: Kericho County
- Elevation: 2,058 m (6,752 ft)
- Time zone: UTC+3 (EAT)

Lumbwa is the historical name for the railway township now known as Kipkelion in Kericho County, Kenya. The name was used during the early Kenya–Uganda Railway era for the station and surrounding settlement on the escarpment above the Rift Valley. The term “Lumbwa” also appears in late-19th and early-20th century records referring to local Kalenjin communities (especially the Kipsigis).

== History ==
The station and township developed as the Uganda Railway reached the highlands at the turn of the twentieth century. Contemporary and later accounts note that the place known to the Kipsigis as Kipkelion was referred to by colonial officials and railway maps as Lumbwa. Archival notes on settler transport similarly reference “railhead at Lumbwa” for routes serving Kericho in the early period.

The name “Lumbwa” also appears in connection with the Lumbwa Treaty of 13 October 1889—an oath-making peace compact between representatives of the Kipsigis and the Imperial British East Africa Company said to have been concluded in the Kipkelion area. Early ethnographic writing also used “Lumbwa” for Kalenjin groups in the wider region.

== Transport ==
The original Lumbwa railway stop later became Kipkelion station on the metre-gauge Kenya–Uganda Railway. Local histories note that the contraction of rail services in the late twentieth century contributed to a decline in the town’s fortunes.

== Notes ==
- Not to be confused with a different settlement commonly referred to as “Lumbwa village” in Bungoma County, Western Kenya.

== See also ==
- Kipkelion
- Kipsigis
