= 2013 Bomet local elections =

Local elections in Kenya

Local elections were held in Bomet County on 4 March 2013 to elect a Governor and County Representatives. Under the new constitution, which was passed in a 2010 referendum, the 2013 general elections were the first in which Governors and members of the County Assemblies for the newly created counties were elected. The elections were also the first general elections to be run by the Independent Electoral and Boundaries Commission(IEBC) which released the official list of candidates.

== Gubernatorial election ==
Candidate	Running Mate	Coalition	Party	Votes
Kirui, Sammy Kipngetich	Kipngetich, Nickson Langat		United Democratic Forum Party	--
Koech, John Kipseng Arap	Chepkwony, David Kipkorir		Kenya African National Union	--
Kones, Julius Kipyegon	Maritim, Stanley Kipkemoi		Kenya National Congress	--
Rotich, David Shadrack	Kerich, Nicholas		Federal Party of Kenya	--
Ruto, Isaac Kiprono	Mutai, Stephen Kipkoech		United Republican Party	--

== Prospective candidates ==
The following are some of the candidates who have made public their intentions to run:

- Isaac Ruto - Chepalungu MP
- Julius Kones - Konoin MP
- Clement Kiplangat Mutai - businessman
- Shadrack Rotich - Manager with the Association of Local Government Authorities of Kenya (Algak),
- John Koech - former East African Community Minister
- Sammy Kirui - former Local Government Permanent Secretary
