= Kalenjin folklore =

Kalenjin folklore consists of folk tales, legends, songs, music, dancing, popular beliefs, and traditions communicated by the Kalenjin-speaking communities, often passed down the generations by word of mouth.

== Origin narrative ==
Prof. Ciarunji Chesaina (1991), recorded a narrative of origin known as "the seven brothers" that speaks of the origin of the Kalenjin people.

...Long ago, there was a man who was very poor. He decided to leave his country in the north and look for a better place. This country was called Emetab Burgei because it was very hot. He traveled along a big river until he came to a very big lake. While at the lake, he prayed to the sun, Asis, for help from his poverty. Suddenly he was given very many cattle and also a wife. Soon after marrying this wife, the man got seven sons.

— Kibet arap Siele (Kericho), approx. 60 years old in 1991

The narrative goes on to state that the man became proud and as a result his sons left him, and even his wife left him for someone who had more cows. The sons went off and founded their own families and those families grew into the various Kalenjin communities today.

== Places & things ==
The Kalejin and indeed other pastoral and wider East African communities find deep significance in landscape features for it is by way of these that they relate to their ancestors and thus their history. Some popular legends based on landscape features include;

=== Mount Kipteber ===
Kipteber Hill (often referred to as Mount Kipteber) is a rocky hill that sits on the border of Elgeyo-Marakwet and Pokot counties. It's about five kilometers away from the range of Cherangany hills. The hill juts out from a plain, and on one side it has a fairly steep cliff facing West Pokot County while the other side slopes gradually towards Elgeyo Marakwet County. Its form has been associated with the hump of a zebu bull. Local legend states that the hill was originally never there and that it once fell from the sky.

The legend of "the rock-fall at Kipteber" is often told in northern Kalenjin communities and more so within the Marakwet and Pokot communities. Sometimes the tale is referred to as 'what is this bird saying?'. In the narrative, it is said that a long time ago there were two communities that lived in the area and were having a ceremony. One of these is often associated with the Talai clan. As the celebrations went on, a crow appeared among the revelers and gave a warning for three days which most of those at the party ignored. The warning was that they should leave the party as a big rock was about to fall from the sky. Some people, however, in certain accounts one pregnant woman, listened to the crow and left. Just in time, for it so happens that a huge rock fell from the sky and crushed all those who were still at the party. This rock, it is believed, can be seen where it fell and is today called Mount Kipteber.

== Beings and legendary figures ==
The Kerit is a mythological creature from Kalenjin folklore that has become well known in other parts of the world, mainly through popular culture and fantasy genres. However, there are a number of other saints, legendary figures and mythical creatures that feature in Kalenjin folklore, some of these include;

=== Cheptalel ===
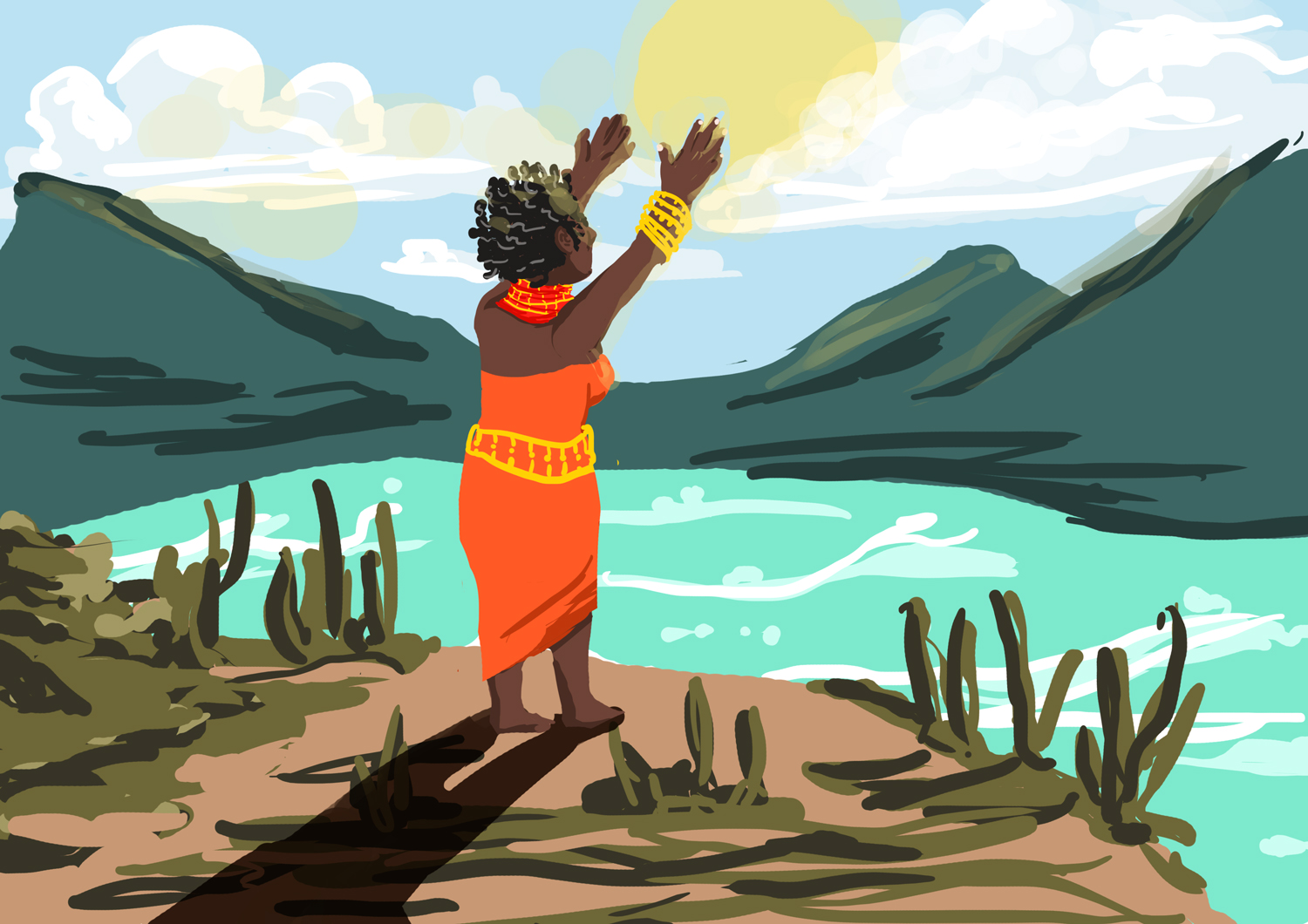
Cheptaleel's Prayer

Cheptalel (also Cheptaleel) is a heroine found in the folklore of the Kipsigis and Nandi sections of the Kalenjin people of Kenya. She became a folk hero as a result of being offered as a sacrifice (actually or symbolically) to save the Kalenjin sections from a drought that was ravaging their land.

In the legend, there came a time when rain disappeared for many years leading to a severe drought such that the elders held a meeting to decide on what to do. It was decided that a young girl would be offered as, or would go and offer, a sacrifice to the owner of the sky so that he would allow rain to fall. A young virgin girl was thus selected to go to a body of water (usually the home of Ilat) to pray for rain.

Her boyfriend found out about the plan and determined to follow her surreptitiously as she went on her mission. When she arrived at the lake (in some accounts waterfall), she stood at the shore and sang her call to the rain.

As she sang, it began to drizzle and when she sang again it began to pour. When she sang a third time, it began to rain heavily and at the same time Ilat, in the form of lightning, struck but before he could get the girl, her boyfriend jumped out of his hiding place and killed Ilat thus rescuing Cheptalel.

=== Ilat ===
Ilat/Ilet (pronounced E-lat) is a figure from Kalenjin mythology who commonly features in Kalenjin folktales. He is associated with thunder and rain and is said to inhabit deep pools and waterfalls and that the rainbow are his discarded garments.

Among the Nandi, Ilet ne-mie and Ilet ne-ya respectively are good and a bad thunder-gods. The crashing of thunder near at hand is said to be Ilet ne-ya trying to come to earth to kill people while the distant rumbling of thunder is Ilet ne-mie protecting man by driving away his name-sake.

Forked lightning is the sword of Ilet ne-ya while sheet lightning is said to be the sword of Ilet ne-mie.

=== Kerit ===
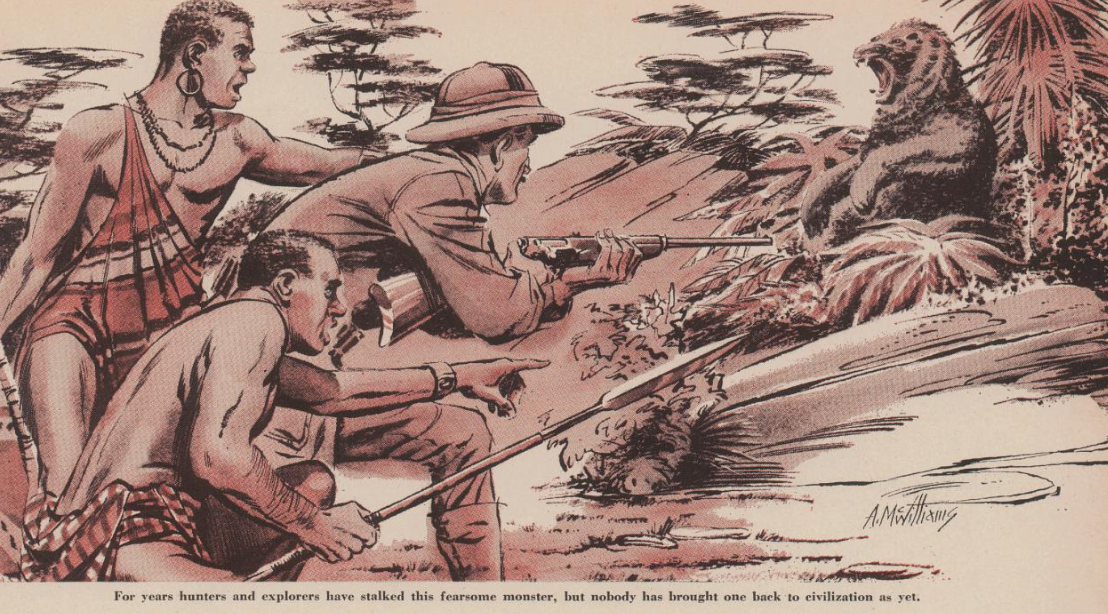
Nandi bear illustration, 1961

The Nandi bear is an unconfirmed animal, reported to live in East Africa. It takes its name from the Nandi people who live in western Kenya, in the area the Nandi bear is reported from. It is also known as Chemisit, Kerit, Koddoelo, Ngoloko, or Duba (which derives from the Arabic words dubb or d.abʕ / d.abuʕ for 'bear' and 'hyena' respectively). The Samburu "Nkampit" appears also to be a version of this creature.

Descriptions of the Nandi bear are of a ferocious, powerfully built carnivore with high front shoulders (over four feet tall) and a sloping back, somewhat similar to a hyena. Some have speculated that Nandi bears are in fact a misidentified hyena or a surviving Ice Age giant hyena: Karl Shuker states that a surviving short-faced hyaena Pachycrocuta brevirostris, extinct c. 500,000 years before present, would "explain these cases very satisfactorily."

The Nandi people call it "kerit". Local legend holds that it only eats the brain of its victims. Nandi bears were regularly reported in Kenya throughout the 19th century and early 20th century. Bernard Heuvelmans's On the Track of Unknown Animals and Karl Shuker's In Search of Prehistoric Survivors provide the most extensive chronicles of Nandi bear sightings in print.

=== Chemosit ===
The Chemosit is often conflated with the Kerit, a creature that is thought to exist by the Kalenjin and surrounding communities. However the Chemosit is the fictitious demonic bogey creature of Kalenjin stories and is not seriously thought of as real by adult Kalenjin. The Chemosit is claimed to be a half-man, half-bird that stands on one leg and has nine buttocks. Its mouth is red and shines brightly at night like a lamp. The Chemosit propels and supports itself with a spear-like stick. There are a number of stories that feature the Chemosit, so much so that the oral literature relating to the Chemosit acquired a specific term among the Nandi, Kapchemosin. This term was also taken to mean fables, stories and legends.

Like the Kerit, people are the Chemosit's food and it is said to prefer children's flesh above all else. However, unlike the Kerit which usually waits for its victims in a tree so as to swipe of their heads as they pass below, the Chemosit entraps its victims by singing sweet songs at night near a place where children are, its open mouth glowing red in the darkness. The children, seeing the light and hearing the song would be attracted to the location thinking it was kambakta, a celebratory dance. They would head off to find the dance and would never be seen again.

Kapchemosin usually follow a similar pattern, the protagonist, often a young person would be warned against a certain action. The performance of said action would usually lead to the Chemosit eating a person or people. However in the end, the protagonist outwits the Chemosit in some manner and cuts off its big toe or thumb thus releasing the people who had previously been eaten.

Among the Tugen and Keiyo, the Chemosit is often portrayed as a shapeshifter, sometimes "wearing" the form of handsome young man and other times that of an old lady who lives in the forest.

=== Tapkendi ===
A popular heroine in Nandi folklore who grew up during a time when ancient Kalenjin grazing grounds were occupied by the Maasai. Her cunning and her sons' bravery led to the first victory against the Maasai, eventually leading to the reconquest of the Uasin Gishu plateau.

In the legend, she lived near the border of Nandi and Maasai lands. She one day conceived a plan to retake the traditional lands of the Nandi. She took off her clothes, tied grass round her body, and fastened bells to her arms and legs. She then went to the Maasai kraals and danced like a mad woman.

Everybody in the kraals thinking she was mad, laughed at her. However the warriors on the grazing grounds hearing the bells ran to see what the cause of the commotion was. As soon as the cattle were left unprotected, the woman’s son’s dashed out of their hiding place and drove the animals into the hills where they were joined by friends and the Maasai warriors dared not pursue them.

The woman at the same time slipped off the bells and made good her escape. This was the first check the Maasai received at the hands of the Nandi, who eventually succeeded in driving them out of their lands.

Her two sons would later found the pororiet known as Kapchepkendi.

=== Kipkeny ===
Kipkeny was a well known cunning wizard who always managed to escape divination by the wizard-finders. A once popular Nandi proverb goes, "Inge'ngora ke'ngor Kipkeny" or "If I am divined, so is Kipkeny", it was much used by a person who boasted of having done wrong and is equivalent to "They might as well expect to catch Kipkeny as me".

=== Tapnai & Kingo ===
A number of accounts state that the founder's of the Kalenjin speaking communities were known as Kingo and his wife, Tapnai. They arrived at Tulwet'ab Kony from a barren, inhospitable land known as Burgei. They settled at Kony where they had a number of sons who in turn gave rise to the various Kalenjin speaking groups.
