= Cheptalel =

Heroine in folklore of the Kalenjin people of Kenya

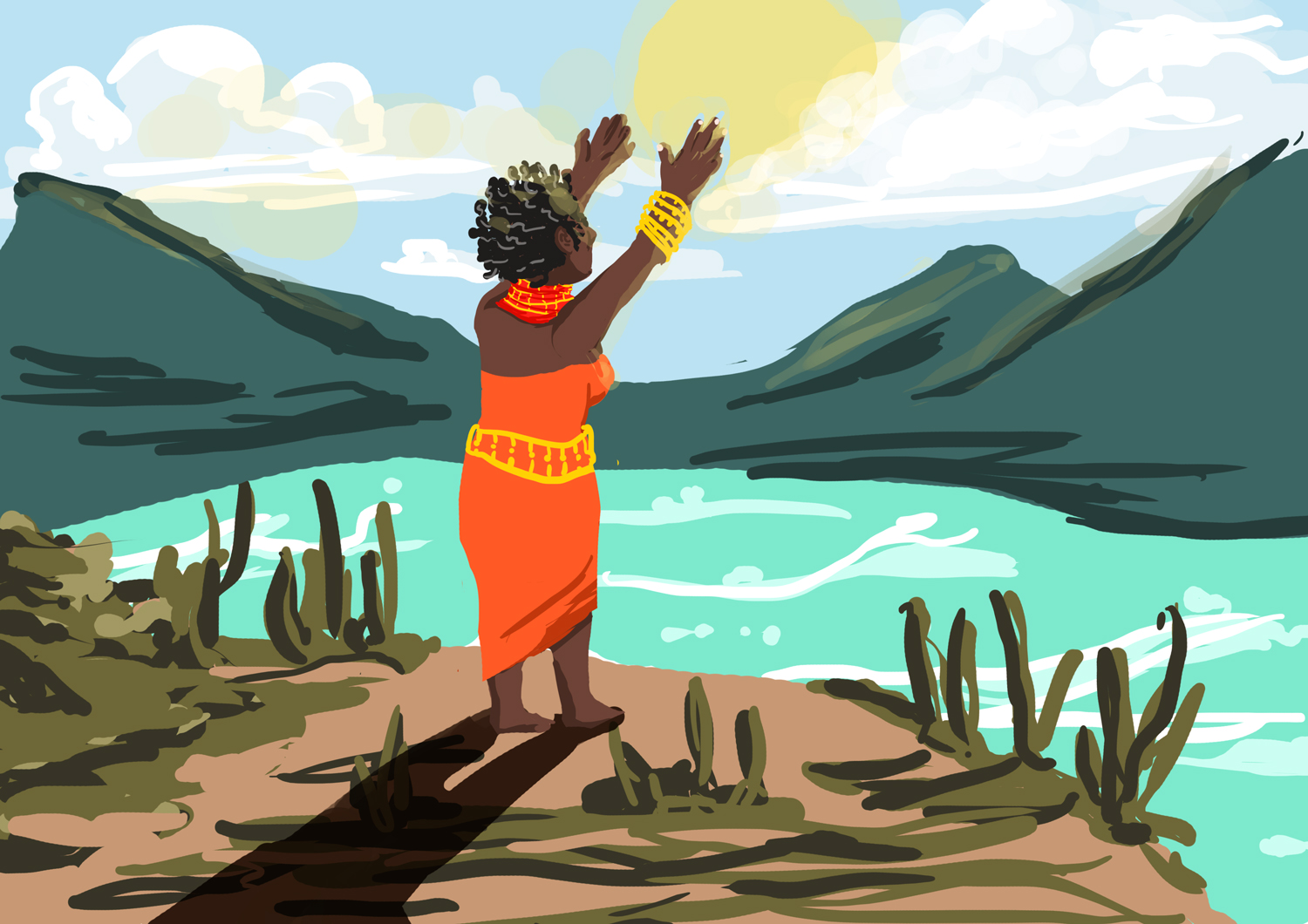
- Contemporary illustration of Cheptalel
- Venerated in: Kalenjin mythology and folklore

Cheptalel (also Cheptaleel) is a heroine found in the folklore of the Kipsigis and Nandi sections of the Kalenjin people of Kenya. She became a folk hero as a result of being offered as a sacrifice (actually or symbolically) to save the Kalenjin sections from a drought that was ravaging their land.

== Etymology ==
The name Cheptalel in Kalenjin mythology was the second most common name given to the supreme being, it denotes an attribute that gives the meaning 'controller of all things'. The similar sounding name Cheptalil gives the thought of a supreme being endowed with glory (lilindo). The two names, Cheptalel and Cheptalil, though false cognates are used interchangeably in common parlance.

Cheptalel is commonly seen to derive from the feminine prefix Chep (or fully Chepto meaning girl) and the word 'lel' meaning pure. A similar naming convention is found in the name Koitalel, where koita means stone. However, when used to denote the supreme being the prefix does not denote a female supreme being. Rather it is associated with one aspect, that of creation and prosperity of life as opposed to the masculine which was associated with destruction.

It has also been postulated that the name derives from a Sudanic name for the sun 'Tel', as of Chee-po-Tel or Tie-po-Tel, thus the girl of Tel i.e. She of the Sun.

== Life ==
There is little in the legend about Cheptalel's background though certain aspects of her early life appear in all traditions. Notably, she is understood to have been a virgin and in some accounts the only child in her family. In all accounts she had a boyfriend who plays a significant role in saving her life.

== Drought legend ==
In the legend, there came a time when rain disappeared for many years leading to a severe drought such that the elders held a meeting to decide on what to do. It was decided that a young girl would be offered as, or would go and offer, a sacrifice to the owner of the sky so that he would allow rain to fall. A young virgin girl was thus selected to go to a body of water (usually the home of Ilat) to pray for rain.

Her boyfriend found out about the plan and determined to follow her surreptitiously as she went on her mission. When she arrived at the lake (in some accounts waterfall), she stood at the shore and sang thus;

"Tulog tuloei, tulo tuloei,
I was sent by the age-mates
Of my father and my mother
To go to the shore of a lake
So that it can rain"

As she sang, it began to drizzle and when she sang again it began to pour. When she sang a third time, it began to rain heavily and at the same time Ilat, in the form of lightning, struck but before he could get the girl, her boyfriend jumped out of his hiding place and killed Ilat thus rescuing Cheptalel.

In one version of the legend, a pure white goat was taken along with her to the water and there the goat was sacrificed and the girl spared.

== In popular culture ==
Christian missionaries adopted the name as a name for God. The name remains in common use today.
