= Sigei =

Sigei is a surname of Kenyan origin that may refer to:

- William Sigei (born 1969), Kenyan long-distance runner and two-time world champion in cross country
- Robert Sigei Kipngetich (born 1982), Kenyan long-distance track runner

== See also ==
- Kipsigis (disambiguation)
