= Kipsigis people =

Sub-Tribe in Kenya

Kipsigis
Kipsigiis, Kipsikiis
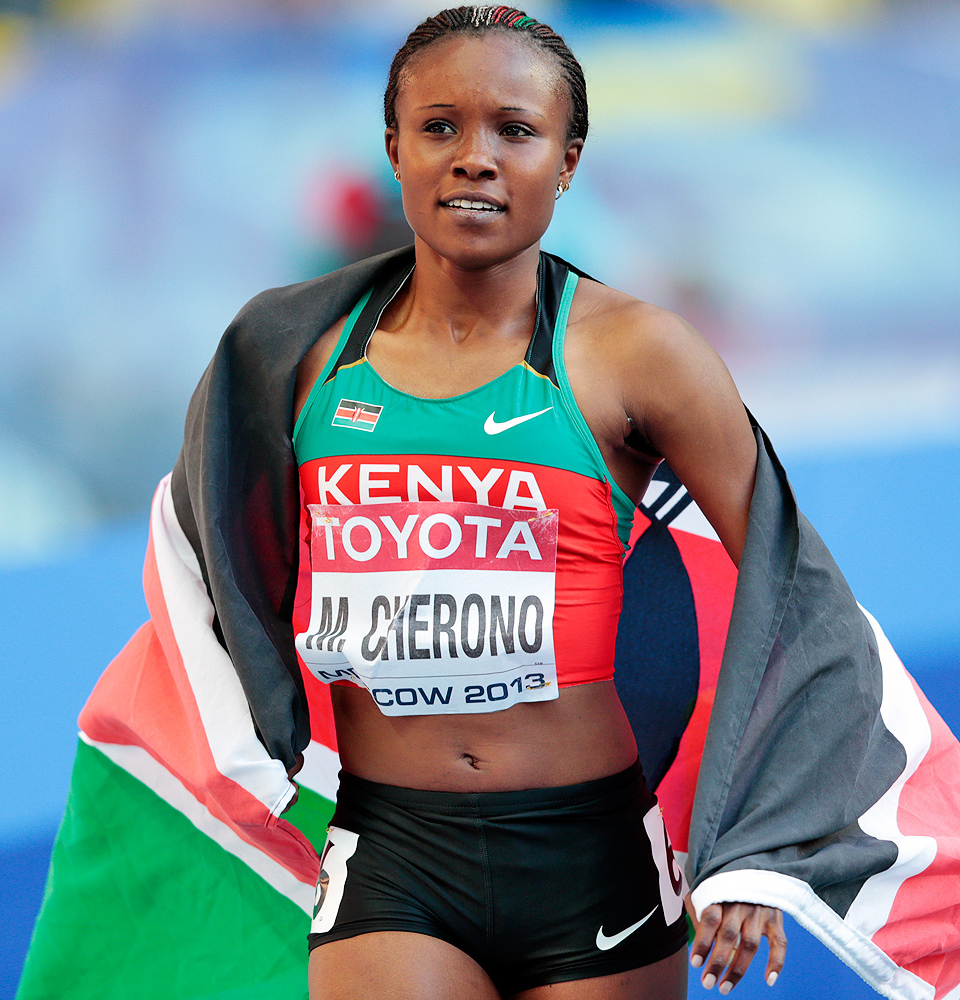

Regions with significant populations
- Kenya: approx. 2.6 Million

Languages
- Kipsigis, Swahili, English and Kalenjin

Religion
- Asissian, African traditional religions minority Christian, Islam, Atheism and Other Minority irreligion

Related ethnic groups
- Kalenjin people: Nandi, Tugen, Marakwet, Sengwer, Sebei, Pokot, Okiek

The Kipsigis (Kipsigiis or Kipsikiis) are the largest tribe of the Kalenjin ethnic group and speak Kipsigis, a dialect of the Kalenjin language which is classified as a Southern Nilotic. Their dialect is identified by their community eponym Kipsigis. While often cited as representing nearly half of all Kalenjin people, official 2019 data placed their share at approximately (30.1%) with a population at 1,916,317. Joshua Project provides modern population estimates reaching 2.6 million in 2025–2026 and explores the "Pharaoh's army" oral tradition alongside standard Nilotic migration theories.

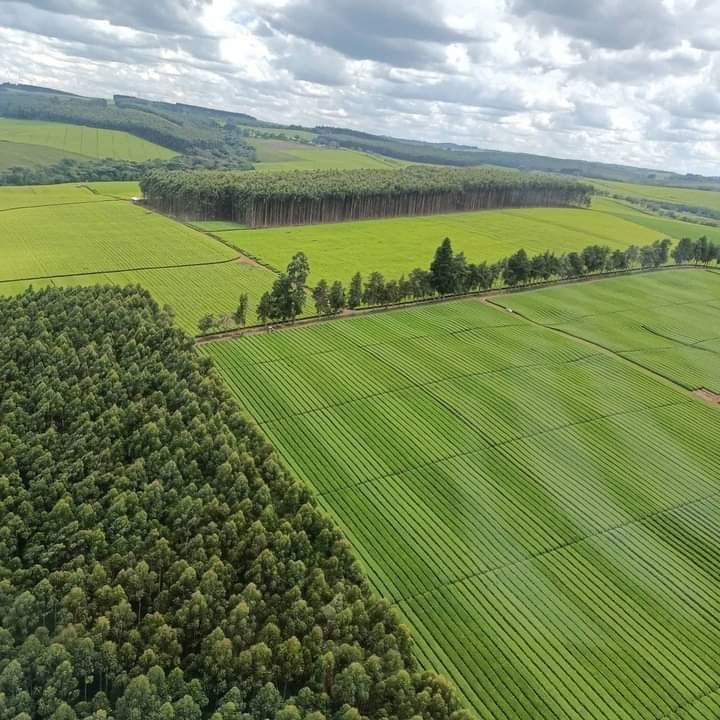
Kericho Tea Plantations

As Highland Nilotes geographically, their ancestral heartland spans the highlands of Kericho and Bomet counties, stretching from Timboroa in the north to the Mara River in the south, and from the Mau Escarpment in the east to Kebeneti in the west; additionally, significant populations reside in Nakuru, Narok, Uasin Gishu, and Trans Nzoia. The Kipsigis maintain a closely intertwined identity with the Ogiek, another indigenous sub-tribe considered one of the earliest inhabitants of Kenya, sharing many linguistic and cultural traits through centuries of inter-assimilation and common social structures.

This Kipsigis closest relatives are the Datooga (or Tatonga) of north-central Tanzania. During their historic southward expansion, ancestral groups of both the Kipsigis and the Datooga are believed to have reached the Shinyanga region of Western Tanzania. While the Datooga remained in Tanzania, evolving into a distinct Southern Nilotic group, the Kipsigis eventually returned northward to the Kericho highlands. Later, a smaller contingent of Kipsigis migrated south again to settle in Angata Barikoi within the Trans Mara region, near the Tanzanian border, where they remain as a significant frontier community.

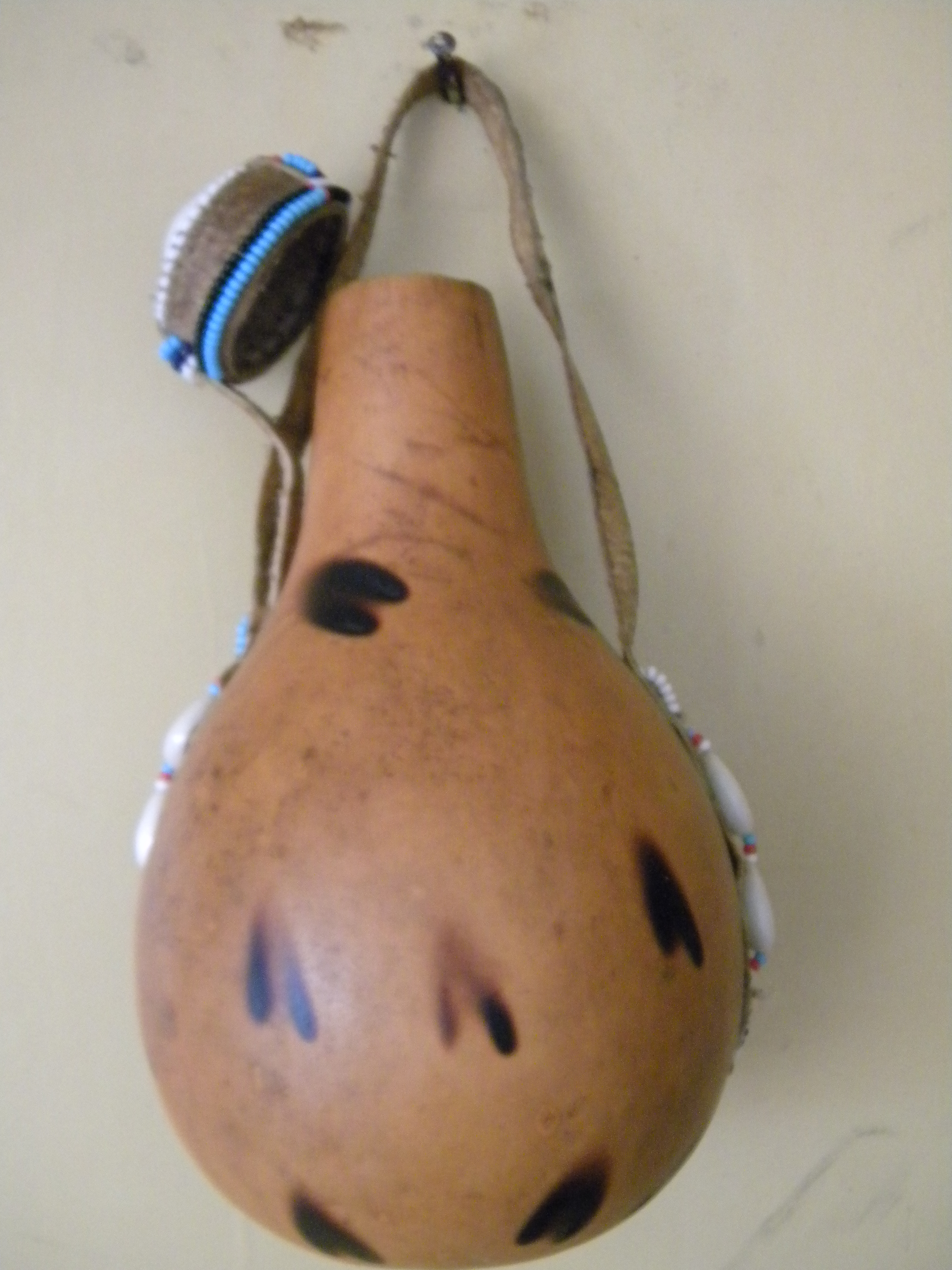
The milk gourd, a cultural symbol of the Kipsigis

The IBEAC company and the British colonial government referred to the Kipsigis people as Lumbwa and Kwavi. The pre-colonial traditional occupations of the Kipsigis included semi-pastoral herding, military expeditions, and farming sorghum and millet. Post-colonial Kipsigis today still live predominantly in their historical national territory on the Western Highlands of Kenya at an altitude of 1500m to 2000m; they mainly grow tea, undertake dairy farming and farm maize. They also grow wheat, pyrethrum and coffee.

== History ==
=== Origin ===
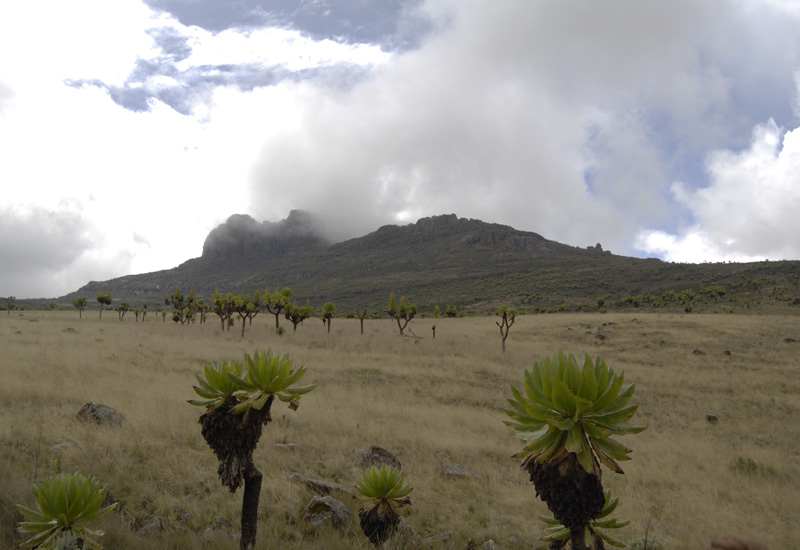
Mount Elgon, the cradleland of Kalenjin tribes

As members of the broader Southern Nilotic family, the Kipsigis trace their ultimate origins further north, with some accounts suggesting they were once part of the Pharaoh's army in Egypt. It is said they became concerned with the Pharaoh's military inconsistencies and chose to separate, adopting an "us against the world" mindset, from where their ancestors migrated southward into East Africa over several millennia. Expanding southward, the Kipsigis sought new grazing lands and resources, eventually displacing the Luo, Kisii, and Maasai. Today, these three communities remain their primary neighbors to the west and south. Locally, the modern Kipsigis identity emerged from a fusion of two primary cultural traditions: the Lumbwa (also known as Lumbua, Umpua, or Ilumbwa) an Iron Age Kalenjin-speaking population historically recorded across southern Kenya, northern Tanzania, and the Mount Kenya region; and migrating Ateker clans. These Ateker groups were part of a larger Eastern Nilotic movement that significantly influenced the demographic and cultural landscape of the Rift Valley, also contributing to the formation of neighboring communities such as the Nandi.

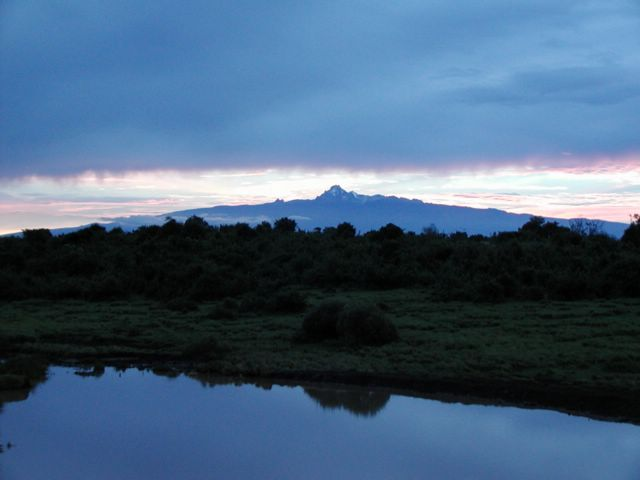
The ancient Kalenjin name for Mount Kenya is Koilegen (or Koi-leken)

The "Lumbwa" were known for their cattle-keeping lifestyle, braided hairstyles, and perhaps the use of sunken livestock enclosures on the slopes of Mount Kenya. Meru oral traditions recall the Lumbwa as one of the early peoples encountered on the mountain, which the Kalenjin remember as Koilege—meaning “dappled rock”. Fadiman (1994) reported of " pits located along a line that runs roughly along the zone at 7,000–7,500 feet which delineates the lowest edge of the forest from the highest point in the star-grass (populated) zone [which] form an irregular line that can be followed from ridge to ridge, along a region that is largely farmland, but which two hundred years ago must have been thickly forested. The largest pits average 16 to 24 feet across." Certain traditions he collected recall that they may have been used to contain Umpua (or Agumba) herds. Most traditions however, recall the Agumba, a people who lived in association with the Lumbwa, as hunters.

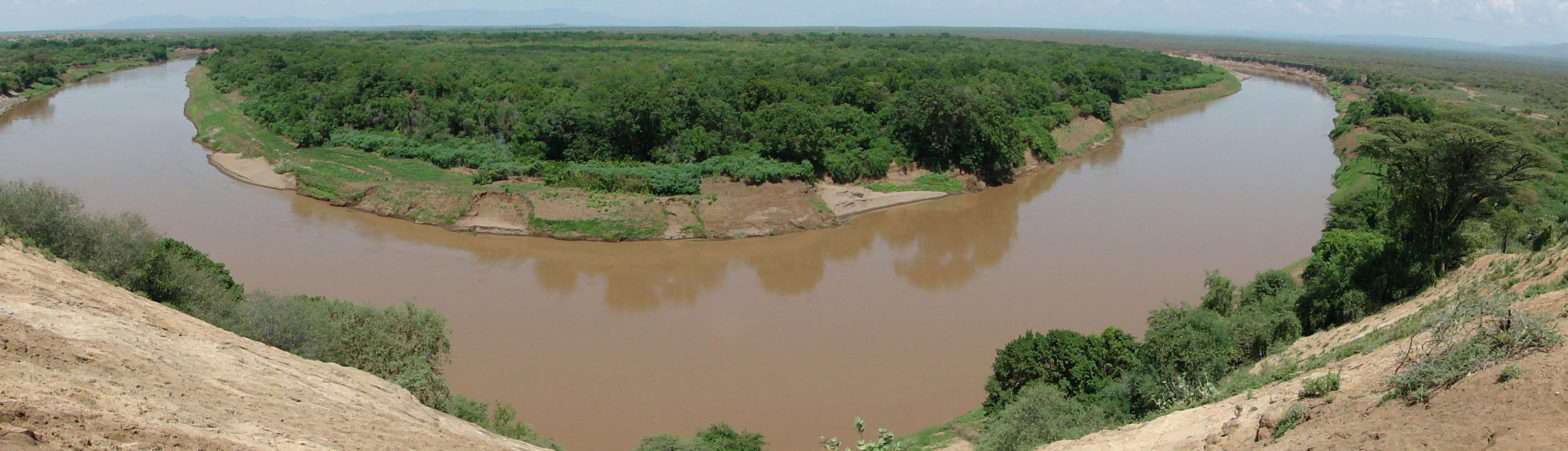
Omo river in Omo Valley, Ethiopia; Maliri people's point of origin

During the late 18th and early 19th centuries, Ateker-related groups migrated southward from the north-eastern Rift Valley, bringing with them new clan systems, ritual practices, and military organization. The recently formed Ateker, calling themselves Loikop (loosely - owners of the land) swept down from a base east of Lake Turkana and in short order took most of the best grazing plains in East Africa from their previous inhabitants (who included among them the Lumbwa). The Uasin Gishu, Laikipia, Mau, Amboseli and Serengeti plains all came under the sway of this new polity. However, written accounts as well as the oral traditions of the Nandi and Kipsigis record the 'reconquest' of the Uasin Gishu plateau, Narok and Bomet, a process that included the assimilation of the 'Maasai' that had latterly occupied them. This fusion gave rise to new identities—including the Kipsigis and Nandi—who nonetheless retained deep Lumbwa roots. Both communities maintain clan traditions linking them to both Lumbwa heritage and Ateker ancestry.

In the 19th century, the term "Lumbwa" was used widely by neighboring Maasai and Bantu-speaking communities to refer to both Kalenjin-speaking and Loikop-related pastoralists. As the identity fused, it came to refer especially to the Kipsigis, who had begun to shift from pastoralism toward an agro-pastoral way of life. Among the Maasai, “Ilumbwa” (meaning "well-diggers") eventually gained pejorative undertones, reflecting cultural differences around land use and livelihood.

By the mid-19th century, the term "Lumbwa" had become closely associated with the Kipsigis, though it was gradually dropped due to its pejorative connotation in Maa-speaking contexts.

== Culture ==
The Kipsigis observe a belief system maintained by all other Kalenjin people. The system observes polytheistic theism with the deities Asiis (a solar deity) and Tororot are each considered major deities. Some studies suggest that Tororot was the initial kalenjin deity but interactions in Kerio valley led to assimilation of the priestly Kibasisek clan whose peculiarity is having the Sun as their tortem; they were much sought after to perform marriage rituals and other religious activities. While multiple other deities exist independently to one another. In the Kipsigis' monotheistic belief system, Asis is instead considered the single supreme deity, and the other deities are considered Asis' attributes, rather than independent entities. The Kipsigis allude to cultural values including superstition, spiritualism, and a sacred and cyclical nature of life. They believe all elements of the natural world are connected, that good deeds never go unnoticed, and that bad deeds lead to consequences in various forms. The Kipsigis view "happiness" as a lack of negative experiences, indicating a quiet and calm state. This convention under the culture and positive psychology studies when contrasted to other indigenous communities gives researchers an obstacle in obtaining a qualitative or quantitative measure of happiness.

The Kipsigis people's oral tradition is observed to have a rich background in songs. Many of their oral traditions feature a creature known as 'Chemosi', usually referred to in western texts and culture as the Nandi bear; a monstrous ape-like basic-intelligence creature which also feature among other communities of Kenya, Uganda and parts of Congo.

A western adventurer Edgar Beecher Bronson claims to have seen a creature that he notes the Lumbwa people referred to as Dingonek. He describes it as a water creature whose features include an armadillo-like, leopard-patterned, hippo-sized back and a leopard's head with two large protruding fangs. He reports that the Lumbwa and the Wadoko peoples spoke of such a creature in the Maggori River then provides an account of his sighting of the said creature. His is the only account of such a creature.

Food and drinks

The meals mainly consist of a cooked, thick paste of elusine flour, vegetables or meat, a blend of milk and cow blood, or milk. The Kipsigis ferment milk in gourds with powdered popcorn flower tree cinders. The sour milk is known as Mursiik. The tribe also brewed Nubian gin and it was reserved for men and women in and past middle age.

Mushrooms

The Kipsigis are known to gather Termitomyces tylerianus, Termitomyces umkowaan and Termitomyces microcarpus (puunereek).

== Beliefs and Rites of Passage ==
Kipsigis rites of passage remain centered on separate initiations for young men and women, typically held during school breaks. For boys, the process of tumdo transitions them into adulthood through circumcision and seclusion, where they are taught community values and the responsibility of defending their people. These ceremonies fundamentally alter family dynamics; once initiated, young men maintain a formal distance from their mothers and sisters, and a sister transitions from a playful to a respectful demeanor toward her brother. These initiations serve as a vital conduit for traditional morals, emphasizing a code of ethics that governs both daily life and conflict. Young men are taught strict rules of conduct, such as sparing surrendered enemies and rejecting loot gained through bloodshed. A defining moment in their oral history is the Yabei episode of the 1800s—a brutal massacre of the Maasai that resulted in a lasting sense of collective guilt. This event reinforces the Kipsigis belief that immoral actions bring about communal misfortune, leading to a cultural perspective where bad luck is often viewed as a consequence of past transgressions.

Regarding spirituality, the Kipsigis maintain a clear distinction between the supernatural and everyday affairs. While many have embraced modern religions, traditional beliefs center on a watchful but distant supreme deity known as Asis, whose primary manifestation is the sun. This belief system is strictly monotheistic; the various names used for Asis represent different attributes of a single god rather than a plurality of deities. This spiritual framework focuses on maintaining harmony with the universe to ensure the prosperity and health of the community.

== Astronomy and calendar ==
The Milky Way is known as Poit'ap kechei (literally sea of stars), the morning star – Tapoiyot, the midnight star – Kokeliet, and Orion's Belt – Kakipsomok. The Milky Way was traditionally perceived as a lake in which children are bathing and playing. Furthermore, the movement of stars was sometimes linked to earthly concerns. For example, the appearance or non-appearance of the Pleiades indicated whether or not to expect a good or a bad harvest. Sometimes superstitions were held regarding certain events. A halo was traditionally said to represent a cattle stockade. At least as of the early 20th century, a break occurring on the east side was considered to be unlucky while one on the west side was seen to be lucky. A comet was at the same time regarded as the precursor of a great misfortune.

The Kipsigis call a month 'Arawet', which is also the term for our satellite, the moon. A year is called 'Kenyit' which can be derived from the phrase 'Ki-nyit' meaning 'to accomplish, to fill in'. A year was marked by the order of months and more importantly by ceremonial and religious celebration of the yearly harvest which was held at the various shrines. This event being analogous to a practice observed by most of the other Africans has inspired the Kwanza festivities celebrated by predominantly by people of African descent in the United States. Kenyit started in February. It had two seasons known as olto (pl. oltosiek) and was divided into twelve months, arawet (pl. arawek). In place of a decade is the order of Ibinda which is usually between 10 and 17 years. In place of a century is the completion of the age set which takes between 100 and 120 years.

The first season of the year, olt-ap-iwot (iwotet), was the wet season and ran from March to August. The dry season, olt-ap-keme (kemeut), ran from September to February. The kipsunde and kipsunde oieng harvest ceremonies were held in September and October respectively to mark the change in Seasons.

=== Months (arawek) and seasons ===
	Name	Meaning	Corresponds
1st Month	Kiptamo	Hot in the fields	February
2nd Month	Iwat-kut	Rain in showers	March
3rd Month	Wake/ Iwootkuut	–	April
4th Month	Ngei	Heart pushed on one side by hunger	May
5th Month	Rob-tui	Black rain or black clouds	June
6th Month	Puret	Mist	July
7th Month	Epeso	–	August
8th Month	Kipsunde	Offering to God in the cornfields	September
9th Month	Kipsunde oieng*	Second offering to God	October
10th Month	Mulkul	Strong wind	November
11th Month	Mulkulik oieng	Second strong wind	December
12th Month	Ngotioto	Month of pin-cushion plant	January

== Geopolitical and military organisation ==
=== Social organization ===
The Kipsigis tribe is a patriarchal society that was organized in terms of geo-political groupings, clan systems, age sets and military ranks.

==== Genealogical Organizations (Ortiinweek) ====
The Kipsigis organize themselves into a series of groupings based on shared kinship analogous to clans. A clan is brought about by a shared ancestor with a context of adoption as a way of naturalization into the clan, usually from Maasai/Gusii/Luo as Kipsigis cannot adopt from within Kalenjin. The patriarchal ancestors, notably the patriarch Kakipoch, immigrated the Nandi-Kipsigis population to Uasin Ngishu plains and Kerio Valley. Formulation of the clan system is thought to have come about due to assimilation of other communities and population growth as a system of preventing pedigree collapse and in-breeding as the main purpose of clans was to prevent marriage within the same clan (marriages being mainly heterosexual but with a lesbian marriage in context). Clans also projected various professionalism and probably adopted identities where for instance, certain clans were exclusively priests, others were exclusively smiths, others exclusively hunters and gathers while others had other particular peculiarities.

==== Generations ====
The Kipsigis observe a cyclical generation setting system. The system seems to have been arrogated plausibly from the Bantu Kikuyu people. The system completes a full rotation in between about a hundred and a hundred and twenty years. The set is composed of generations that extend between 15 and 20 years. The system was used to account for historical events and demographic management.

Set		Years	Western equivalent	Notes
Nyongi	1st cycle	1783 to 1801 (19 years)		Plausible adoption era of circumcision and initiation
Nyongi	2nd cycle	1905 to 1920 (16 yrs)	Interbellum Generation/The Greatest Generation	
Nyongi	3rd cycle	2019 onwards	Gen Alpha	Social Network generation
Maina	1st cycle	1802 to 1819 (18 yrs)		
Maina	2nd cycle	1921 to 1936 (16 yrs)	Silent Generation	King's African Rifles and world war era generation
Chumo	1st cycle	1820 to 1836 (17 yrs)		
Chumo	2nd cycle	1937 to 1951 (15 yrs)	Silent Generation/Baby Boomer Generation	
Sawe	1st cycle	1837 to 1853 (17 yrs)		Remembered for the failed war of Ng'oino
Sawe	2nd cycle	1952 to 1966 (15 yrs)	Baby Boomer Generation	Post war and independence era
Kerongoro	1st cycle	1854 to 1870 (17 yrs)		
Kerongoro	2nd cycle	1967 to 1981 (15 yrs)	Generation X /Xennials	
Kaplelach	1st cycle	1871 to 1887 (17 yrs)	The Lost Generation	Remembered for the failed war of Mogori
Kaplelach	2nd cycle	1982 to 1999 (18 yrs)	Xennials/ Millennials	Daniel Moi's free primary education era
Kipnyige	1st cycle	1888 to 1904 (17 yrs)	Interbellum Generation	
Kipnyige	2nd cycle	2000 to 2018 (19 yrs)	Generation Z	Technology and civil liberties generation

==== Geopolitical organization ====
Em or emet, was the highest recognized geographic division among the Kipsigis. It spans a geopolitical region demarcated as being a jurisdiction of the tribe and entitled to a decree of sovereignty. This unit was identifiable as a political institution but the main work of civil control and administration was done by the kokwotinwek (plural of kokwet). Linguistic evidence indicates that this form of societal organization dates back to their Southern Nilotic heritage. It is believed that the Southern Nilotes of two thousand years ago cooperated in loose supra-clan groupings, called *e:m.

Kokwet was the most significant political and judicial unit among the Kipsigis. The governing body of each kokwet was its kok (village council). Kokwet denotes a geographic cluster of settlement similar in concept to a village. Kok elders were the local authority for arbitration and conflict resolution.

===== The Office of the King (Oorgoiiyoot) =====
The Kipsigis were initially and traditionally acephalous with decentralized and non-stratified communes whose judicio-political organ known as Kok, consisting of elders of reputation, served as a system of government.

Operational in Nandi, the Orkoiyot institution was communed to Kipsigis not later than 1850, after the ousting and assassination of Kimnyole Arap Turgat. Kimnyole sent his three sons (Kipchomber arap Koilege, Arap Boisyo and Arap Buigut) to Kipsigis who immediately began to establish a Kipsigis confederation, each of them establishing kingly homesteads with servants, messengers and reception parlors. The office of the Oorgoiiyoot was dissolved after the Lumbwa Treaty.

==== Military organisation ====
While evidence suggests precolonial Kipsigis as having engaged in conquests of territory, a mistaken impression emerges of an efficient organized military; rather the existence of a Kipsigis army was indicative of a social organization at the tribal level despite evidence of large portions of conquered territory and defeat of strong armies. The precolonial Kipsigis were presented as a markedly acephalous society politically with both military and political organization having to be examined in terms of relatively autonomous territorial groups within the tribe.

The Kipsigis armies organized themselves into four regiments (pororiosiek) namely: Kipkaige, Ng'etunyo, Kebeni and Kasanet. Recruitment into the regiments was achieved through the age set and clan system. Each regiment fought independently which often resulted in weak and often conflicting strategies. At a later stage, the four regiments merged into two, consisting of Kipkaige and Kasanet on the one side and Ng'etunyo and Kebeni on the other; but ultimately, the strength of this army was tested with a resounding defeat at the hands of Gusii in the battle of Ngoina dated to circa 1850. Once again, the Kipsigis army regiments regrouped into one force composed equally of all four regiments and while this development would spur a record of victories, it would also be tested in the battle of Mogori circa 1890 with a defeat that had dire implications on the spirit and identity of the Kipsigis.

Other studies depict a more elaborate military organization; for instance, there were an extra tire of regiments and ranks including: the generals (Kiptayat/Kiptaiinik), spies (Yotiik, Seegeik and Sogooldaiik), and the procession ranks (Ng'anymetyeet, Pirtiich, Oldimdo/Lumweet and Kipeelbany). There were yearly mock up practice for warring called Kaambageet.

The arms of the fighting men usually consisted of a spear, shield, sword and club. By the late 19th century, up to four kinds of spears, representing various eras and areas were in use. In Nandi, the eren-gatiat, of the Sirkwa era was still in use though only by old men. It had a short and small leaf-shaped blade with a long socketed shank and a long butt. Two types of the Maasai era spear, known as ngotit, were also in use. Those of the eastern, northern and southern counties had long narrow blades with long iron butt, short socket and short shaft. Those of the central county (emgwen) had short broad blades with short iron butts. In the western counties, a spear that had a particularly small head, a long shaft and no butt was in use, it was known as ndirit. The pastoral Pokot carried two Maasai era spears, known as ngotwa while the agricultural sections armed themselves with a sword, known as chok.

Archery was also very much a prominent skill practiced among the Kipsigis for purposes ranging from agriculture to defense and security. There were an array of arrows for various specialties such as for shooting a bull for blood, hunting arrows and defensive arrows meant either as a deterrent by causing mortal wounds or others meant to get stuck in the victim while others were poisoned and thus each of the arrow types were used depending on the occasion.

===== Significant wars and battles =====
Battle	Estimated Year	Generation	War Front	Commander	Notes
Battle of Mabasi					
Kaplong war	c.1870		Kaplong/Sotik	Menya Araap Kisiara	The Kipsigis emerged victorious and defeated Maasai with the later disavowing what is today Bomet county and Narok West constituency.
Battle of Ng'oino	c.1850	1st cycle Sawe	Bureti/Roret		The Kipsigis army was defeated and had to restructure their regiment system.
Battle of Tiriitab Moita					
Battle of Kibongwa					
Battle of Chelemei					
Battle of Kipsabanut					
Battle of Benjo					
Chemoiben War.	c.1850				Fought in Chemoiben (near Litein). Resulted in defeat of the Gusii and freeing up of Kericho West and Bureti for Kipsigis occupation
Mogori war (Saosao war in Gusii)	c.1885	1st cycle Kaplelach		Malabun Araap Makiche	The legion of armies was decimated at a 99.5% rate making it Kipsigis' most infamous and tragic war with profound effects.

===== Historical Kipsigis war heroes =====
The military culture of the Kipsigis directly led to adoration of war heroes and successful commanders. Some of them include: Araap Ngulolu, Kipsiongo Araap Terer of Kipkoibon, Araap Taptugen of Belgut, Araap Buiywo, Araap Nyarino, Araap Tamasoon, Araap Kirui of Klatteroeek clan, Araap Tompo, Araap Mastamet, Araap Cheriro, Kendeiywo Araap Baliach, Arap Moigi and Araap Tengecha (who stood out among all of them and a close friend of Jomo Kenyatta).

== Precolonial history ==
Breaking away from the former Chemwal ethnicity and becoming Kipsigis in about 1790s and 1800s, the Kipsigis population grew from an estimated population of less than five hundred in what is today's Fort Tenan. From here, they acquired military resilience against the neighbouring Luo who would go on to call them Jalang'o (meaning one who is spirited). They also fought Kisii communities out of today's Kabianga in Kericho West District and also towards the east against the Maasai who occupied parts of Kipkelion, Kericho and Londiani. The expansion of the Kipsigis territory was rapid and violent and by the 1890s as Orkoiyot institution was established, Kipsigis territory extended from the Nandi Hills in the North to Sotik in the South, with a small region in Bureti.

=== Orkoiyot Autocracy ===
Leading up to assassination of Orkoiyot Kimnyole Araap Turukat by the Nandi, the king sent out his four sons into hiding in Tugen country, and later on as the Nandi people demanded the youngest, Koitalel Araap Samoei be their king, the other three left for Kipsigisland under their benefactor and brother-in-law, Kimondi Araap Sinei (father to Prophet Mugeni). The three brothers were Kipchomber Araap Koilegen, Kipngetich Araap Boisio, and Singoei Kibuigut Araap Barbarani. Individually, they were assigned frontiers of influence among the Kipsigis to bless territorial advance d fortune.

Among the three, Kipchomber Araap Koilegen emerged as the most powerful and led both the Kipsigis and Tugen communities from Belgut in Kericho; He can be considered King of the Kipsigis. They established kingly homesteads and had a systematic formation of messengers, spokespersons, and advisers. Koilegen's leadership was crucial during the most significant territorial expanse of Kipsigisland. However, following prophecies and advise from his father, Koilegen led the Kipsgis and Tugen into collaboration with Europeans, unlike his brother Koitalel Araap Samoei who led the Nandi through the Nandi resistance.

=== Menya Araap Kisiara ===
Menya Araap Kisiara was a famed warlord among the Kipsigis who is remembered for a number of significant wars and numerous battles that led to expansive territorial acclaim for the Kipsigis. He was a multilingual warrior who initially exiled himself into Maasai country for marrying his own clanswoman, a taboo in the community. When he returned, cultural heritage dictates allowed him to begin his own clan to avert the quagmire. He went on to lead decisive wars against the Abagusii and Maasai communities, thus opening territory for Kipsigis from the bamboo areas of Kericho to the modern-day tribal domain of the Kipsigis.

The most decisive wars led by Menya Araap Kisiara include a war against Gusii people in Chemosot, Bureti, and the Kaplong war in Sotik. Particularly in the latter, Menya negotiated a war that would decide tribal boundaries. Having been driven all out from Londiani in Kericho to Kaplong, the Maasai and through their commanders and the Kipsigis under Menya made a covenant that any defeated party would retreat about 100 kilometres into their territory. The war ensued for several months, but victory belonged to the Kipsigis, and as a result, and as vowed by the Maasai commander, the Maasai peoples moved 10 hills past Abosi Hill towards Keekorok.

=== Prophet Mugeni ===
Barn'getuny Araap Kosgei, later famed Prophet Mugeni and a maternal grandson to Kimyole Araap Turukat, was a messenger, adviser and part of the cabinet to Orkoiyot Kipchomber Araap Koilege, who was his maternal uncle. He lived in what is today Sotik town, located in Bomet County. In his role, he was responsible for relaying messages from the King, Araap Koilege and during his lifetime, he witnessed consequential events in the community including Kaplong war, the failed battle of Mogori also known as Saosao war, and Sotik massacre. Mugeni holds a special position in the Kipsigis community as the prophet who foresaw the coming and the eventual departure of white settlers in their tribal land. His visions depicted a future for the Kipsigis and various communal eventualities. From territorial expanse of what is considered Kipsigis country to the leaders of the new country Kenya that would be formed after independence.

== Colonial history ==
The Kipsigis had an initial contact with the British in 1889 and within 17 years, the British had established their rule over the tribe. The British initially started to expropriate the tribal Kipsigis land to create a buffer zone between the mutually antagonistic Gusii and Kipsigis; but it was clear from the beginning that an underlying tenet of the British policy towards the Kipsigis was the ultimate conversion of the tribe from a predominantly semi-pastoral economy to one of peasant cultivation.

=== Sotik Massacre ===
Originally not part of the White Highlands, Sotik District was a Y-shaped strip of land about 50 miles and in some places not more than three miles wide, carved out of the Native Reserve. Sotik was Abugusii and Maasai territory before 1800 but, under a treaty promulgated by Menya Araap Kisiara, the Maasai were pushed to Trans-Mara. Following the arrival of the British, the Kipsigis rallied alongside the Nandis to fight against the building of the Kenya-Uganda Railway.

Seeing the long-drawn-out resistance of the Nandi led by Koitalel Araap Samoei, to intelligence officer Richard Meinertzhagen, vowed to break the impasse. In the middle of 1905, a punitive raid led by Major Richard Pope-Hennessy killed 1,850 men, women, and children who were rounded up and fired upon indiscriminately with a Maxim gun and other weapons. The massacre was ostensibly in retaliation against the refusal by the Sotik people to heed an ultimatum by the British government to return cattle raided from the Maasai. It is noted that medal of honours were awarded to officers who took part in these operations around the same time.

Some months later on 19 October 1905, Richard Meinertzhagen tricked Koitalel into what was effectively an ambush and shot him at point-blank range, killing him on the spot and the rest of his entourage. With Koitalel dead, the Nandi resistance was neutralized, and the British proceeded to evict the Kipsigis and Nandi from their land and sent them to areas that were largely unfit for human habitation. The Sotik massacre and the assassination of Koitalel were directly linked to the setting aside of Sotik for European settlement and the colonial system of forced labour, punitive taxes for Africans, economic, and racial segregation. It is disingenuous to argue that it was a buffer zone to keep warring African tribes apart.

In August 2020, following the murder of George Floyd, Claudia Webbe, Member of Parliament for Leicester East wrote in a letter addressed to UK's Secretary of State for Education, Gavin Williamson, about Sotik Massacre and asked that the massacre should be taught in British schools.

== World War I ==
World War I is inferred among the Kipsigis as 'Boriet ap Jeromaan' - literally 'German War' and it's an inflection point among the Kipsigis coming out of which, integration into modernity. Some men were drafted or volunteered to fight and it is remarked how the Empire they fought for did not recognize them or keep any records or accounts of African soldiers.

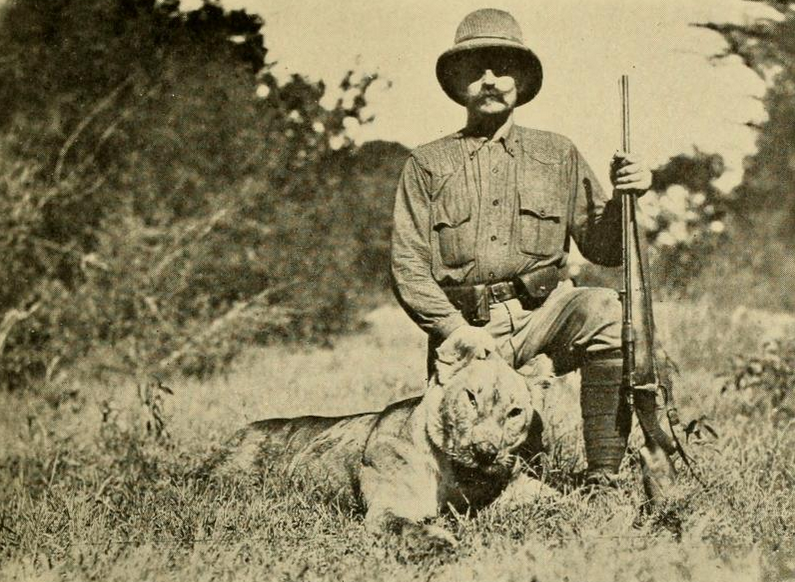
Big game in Sotik plains in 1910

=== Nandi Protest of 1923 ===
A number of factors taking place in the early 1920s led to what has come to be termed the Nandi Protest or Uprisings of 1923. It was the first expression of organized resistance by the Nandi since the wars of 1905–06.

Primary contributing factors were the land alienation of 1920 and a steep increase in taxation, taxation tripled between 1909 and 1920 and because of a change in collection date, two taxes were collected in 1921. The Kipsigis and Nandi refused to pay and this amount was deferred to 1922. Further, due to fears of a spread of rinderpest following an outbreak, a stock quarantine was imposed on the Nandi Reserve between 1921 and 1923. The Nandi, prevented from selling stock outside the Reserve, had no cash, and taxes had to go unpaid. Normally, grain shortages in Nandi were met by selling stock and buying grain. The quarantine made this impossible. The labour conscription that took place under the Northey Circulars only added to the bitterness against the colonial government.

All these things contributed to a buildup of antagonism and unrest toward the government between 1920 and 1923. In 1923, the saget ab eito (sacrifice of the ox), a historically significant ceremony where leadership of the community was transferred between generations, was to take place. This ceremony had always been followed by an increased rate of cattle raiding as the now formally recognized warrior age-set sought to prove its prowess. The approach to a saget ab eito thus witnessed expressions of military fervor and for the ceremony all Nandi males would gather in one place.

Alarmed at the prospect and as there was also organized protest among the Kikuyu and Luo at that time, the colonial government came to believe that the Orkoiyot was planning to use the occasion of the Saget ab eito of 1923 as a cover under which to gather forces for a massive military uprising. On 16 October 1923, several days before the scheduled date for the saget ab eito, the Orkoiyot Barsirian Arap Manyei and four other elders were arrested and deported to Meru. Permission to hold the ceremony was withdrawn and it did not take place, nor has it ever taken place since. The Orkoiyot Barsirian Arap Manyei would spend the next forty years in political detention, becoming Kenya's, and possibly Africa's, longest-serving political prisoner.

One of the foremost Kipsigis colonial Chiefs was Cheborge Arap Tengecha. Although he was sometimes fondly referred to as “Kiprany-tich,” meaning he stood up to colonial excesses, this nom de guerre was countermanded by his alleged heavy-handedness and “unbridled” obsequiousness towards the colonial authorities. Nevertheless, Arap Tengecha can be credited with some positive deeds that helped transform the Kipsigis society in a changed world of colonial domination. First, the man, born about 1892, embraced literacy by accepting to go to school, unlike his peers. His capacity to read and write earned him a place in the colonial law courts and civil service as an interpreter based at the Kericho District Commissioner’s office. He served under District Commissioners, Cecil M. Dobbs, Sydney Hubert La Fontaine, George Henry C. Boulderson, T. H. Hinkinson, among others. As an acknowledgement of his prowess as an interpreter, Arap Tengecha was sent to Kerendei in Maasailand (Narok) in 1921 to continue his work there, having mastered the Maa language and other languages such as Kisii, Luo and Swahili. In 1934, he was appointed to the exalted position of Chief of Bomet Location where he excelled in his new position as an administrator and enforcer of colonial policies. When the district administration was reorganised by District Commissioner Henry G. Gregory-Smith in 1946, Chief Tengecha, now a top favourite of the colonial government, was appointed the Chief of Bureti Location where he served until his retirement in 1961. In recognition of his “illustrious career” at his retirement, Queen Elizabeth II of England conferred on Chief Tengecha the coveted OBE (Order of the British Empire).

== World War II ==
With the German, Italian and Japanese threat at the borders of the British Empire, many people were dragged into military service during World War II. In East Africa, a huge number of Kenyans were recruited to serve in the Burma and Ethiopian Campaigns. Known to the Kipsigis as 'Boriet ap Talianek', literally Italian war, the world event marks a period of time and denotes a generation where some of its youthful men either volunteered or were drafted into the King's African Rifles forces. In August 1914, during the First World War, KAR soldiers were dispatched to fight German forces between what is Kenya-Tanzania border today, moreso in Taita-Tavetta. During the Second World War in 1944, some were deployed to join the fight in Burma Campaign against the Imperial Japanese Army. After the war, African soldiers were forgotten and hardly any records of them and their accounts were kept.

== Post-independence ==
=== Emerging socio-cultural trends and dynamics ===
The Kipsigis culture and heritage has transformed and attritioned initially as a result of the contact with British colonialists and a remarkable switch to Christianity, forsaking the belief in Asiis or incorporating some aspects of their traditional religion into Christianity. Later on, a formal colonial government meant the tribe had to comply with government rules and laws which in part vitiated some traditional norms such as warring and raiding neighboring antagonistic tribes. After independence, the declining of adherence to culture and heritage subsisted, significantly, the banning of female genital mutilation led to abandonment of initiation of girls while schooling limited the period of time boys spent in seclusion during initiation; apparently, because of the spread of HIV and the devastating impact associated as some of the first cases were reported in Kenya in the late 1980s, circumcision of boys was promoted and as a result, the custom of initiation of boys persisted.

== Music, film and written arts ==
Contemporary Kalenjin music has long been influenced by Kipsigis producers, artistes, and musicians leading to Kericho's perception as a cultural innovation center in Kenya and effectively in the Great-Lakes Region of Africa. Community introspection reveals how Chepalungu constituency has beaten the odds to carve a niche for itself as the home of Kalenjin secular artistes. One notable Raphael Kipchamba arap Tapotuk was a luminary artiste, songwriter and producer credited as being a forebearer of Kalenjin pop culture often manifesting his works as folk song, country, and jazz. His music records are beloved by the entirety of Kalenjin; Daniel Toroitich Arap Moi, William Samoei Ruto and a host of Kalenjin leaders and celebrities in attending Kipchamba's funeral in his home in Chepalungu, 14 April 2007 remarked the might and their love for the artiste.

A song "Chemirocha III" collected by ethnomusicologist Hugh Tracey in 1950 from the Kipsigis in Kapkatet in Kericho was written in honour of Jimmie Rodgers. The song's title is an approximation of the musician's name. According to legend, tribe members were exposed to Rodgers' music through British soldiers during World War II. Impressed by his yodeling, they envisioned Rodgers as "a faun, half-man and half-antelope." "Chemirocha III" is credited to "Chemutoi Ketienya with Kipsigis girls", and was described by Tracey as "humorous" in his notes. "Chemirocha III" is included on Tracey's "The Music of Africa: Musical Instruments 1: Strings" LP, from 1972.

Kimursi, an actor in the 1950 adventure film: King Solomon's Mines, is credited as being of Kipsigis ethnicity. In the cast, he took on the role of Khiva.

The Kenyan long-distance runner Ezekiel Kemboi danced to a Kalenjin hit single, "Emily Chepchumba", during the 2011 IAAF Daegu World championship, after crossing the finish line in the 3000 metres steeplechase and during the London Summer Olympics held in August 2012, after crossing the finish line in the 3000 metre steeple chase finals and winning gold. The song was written, sang and recorded by a Kipsigis artist, Bamwai.

== Sports ==
Kalenjin are reputable as an ethnic conglomerate endemic with athletic prowess. The Kipsigis, the most populous tribe among the Kalenjin has had a culture of sportsmanship among its population and through the years, there have been excellent sportsmen and sportswomen from the tribe. It is believed that genetic predisposition, altitude and environmental adaptation, diet, poverty and all-inclusive training philosophy contribute to the success of Kalenjin sportspersons.

=== Notable sportspeople ===
- Emily Chebet – long-distance runner, World Cross Country gold (2010, 2013), Commonwealth Games bronze (2014 10000m)
- Robert Kiprono Cheruiyot – marathon runner, Boston Marathon champion (2010)
- William Chirchir – middle-distance runner, Commonwealth Games silver (2002 1500m)
- Cornelius Chirchir – middle-distance runner, IAAF Grand Prix Final bronze (2002 1500m)
- John Cheruiyot Korir – long-distance runner, World Military Championships gold (2002, 2007 10000m)
- Paul Kipsiele Koech – steeplechaser, Olympic bronze (2004 3000m st.), multiple World Athletics Final golds
- Caroline Cheptanui Kilel – long-distance runner, World Half Marathon Championships gold (2009)
- Peter Cheruiyot Kirui – long-distance runner (notable road races)
- Wilson Kiprugut Chumo – middle-distance runner, Olympic bronze (1964 800m), Olympic silver (1968 800m)
- Lineth Chepkurui – long-distance runner (road and cross country)
- Hellen Chepngeno – cross-country runner, World Cross Country gold (1994)
- Mercy Cherono – middle/long-distance runner, World Championships silver (2013 5000m), Commonwealth Games gold (2014 5000m)
- Paskalia Chepkorir Kipkoech – long-distance runner, World Half Marathon silver (2012)
- Nicholas Kipkirui – footballer, Harambee Stars, contracted to Gor Mahia
- John Korir Kipsang – long-distance runner (road racing)
- Aldrine Kibet – footballer, player at RC Celta de Vigo
- David Kimutai Rotich – racewalker, multiple African Championships medals, All-Africa Games gold (1999 20 km walk)
- Edwin Cheruiyot Soi – long-distance runner, Olympic bronze (2008 5000m), World Athletics Final gold (2008 5000m)
- Kipkurui Misoi – steeplechaser, Commonwealth Games bronze (1998 3000m), All-Africa Games gold (1999 3000m)
- Dominic Kiprono – footballer, contracted to Zoo Kericho F.C.
- Isaac Kipyegon – footballer, contracted to Zoo Kericho F.C.
- Joyce Chepchumba – marathon runner, Olympic bronze (2000 marathon)

== Science and academia ==
It is observed that among the Kipsigis, knowledge is measured binomially where to be thought of as knowledgeable, ng’om, one has to display the application of the corresponding knowledge. In academia, the 'Kipsigis' word or eponym has inspired the nomenclature of an extinct genus of East African antelope from the middle Miocene (Kipsigicerus). Other academic terms associated with the Kipsigis include Acraea sotikensis and Sotik lion (Panthera leo melanochaita).

Dr. Taaitta Araap Toweett was a Kipsigis elite and political leader. He was awarded scholarship by the Kipsigis County Council in 1955 to the South Devon Technical College, Torquay, to study for a diploma in public and social administration. He obtained a B.A. (1956) and B.A. (Hons) 1959 from the University of South Africa. On his return from Britain in 1957, he was appointed Community Development Officer for Nandi District, the first African CDO to be recruited locally in Kenya. During this period was the editor of the Kipsigis vernacular magazine Ngalek Ap Kipsigisiek, published quarterly. He was one of the eight original Africans elected to the Legislative Council in 1958 as Member for the Southern Area, a constituency comprising mainly Kipsigis and Maasai Districts. He formed Kalenjin Political Alliance Party that later on got into an alliance with KADU. He served on the Dairy Board and played a crucial role in the foundation of the co-operative movement nationally. In 1960, 1962, 1963 he attended the Lancaster House Conferences held in London to draft Kenya's Constitution, paving the way for complete self-rule. Before Kenya's independence, he was appointed Assistant Minister for Agriculture (1960), Minister of Labour and Housing in 1961 and Minister of Lands, Surveys and Town Planning in 1962. After Kenya's Independence, he was appointed Minister for Education in 1969, Minister for Housing and Social Services in 1974, Minister for Education in 1976. He was also elected President of the 19th General Assembly of UNESCO (1976–1978). In 1977, he finished his PhD thesis on "A Study of Kalenjin Linguistics". In 1980, he was appointed as the chairperson of Kenya Literature Bureau. In 1983–1985, he served as the Charperson, Kenya Airways after which he was appointed the chairperson, Kenya Seed Company. He also served as a director of the Kenya Times newspaper and went on to edit and publish his own newspaper, Voice of Rift Valley, between 1997 and 2000.

Professor Jonathan Kimetet Araap Ngeno was a Kipsigis elite who was sponsored by African Inland Church from Litein to study in the United States. He was invited back to Kenya and reintegrated by Daniel arap Moi to achieve political attrition over Dr. Taaitta Toweett. He was appointed to Ministerial positions and was elected the Fourth Speaker of the Parliament of Kenya succeeding coincidentally his baghuleita (a male agemate who was initiated in the same seclusion home), Moses Kiprono arap Keino.

In the 1990s, Professor Davy Kiprotich Koech by then the Director of Kenya Medical Research Institute and Dr. Arthur O. Obel, the Chief Research Officer published in two medical journals the initial results of the newfound drug "Kemron" that was perceived from the preliminary study of 10 patients to cure AIDS. The drug was introduced in a public ceremony presided by Kenya's former President, Daniel Toroitch Arap Moi and the work of the new wonder drug discovered was hailed as a major step against HIV/AIDS. Kemron was the trade name for a low-dose of alpha interferon, manufactured form of a natural body chemical in a tablet form that dissolves in the mouth. Clinical trials of Kemron funded by WHO in five African Countries did not find any health benefits reported by Kemri Scientists. Thereafter, WHO in a press release in its headquarters in Geneva, Switzerland, termed Kemron as an experimental drug of unproven benefit for HIV/AIDS treatment. The American National Institute of Health concluded that no one had been able to duplicate the effects claimed by scientists behind Kemron. In 1998 Prof. Davy Koech led the Commission of Inquiry into the Education System of Kenya. Hosted by Kenya Broadcasting Cooperation (KBC) in 2019, Prof. Koech cited bad peer review on his experimental drug and that he was currently overseeing reexamination of Kemron and further research in China.

Professor Richard Kiprono Mibey has discovered more than 120 species of fungi, made major input to the discovery of environmentally friendly fungi for bio-control of the obnoxious water hyacinth weed in Lake Victoria has contributed to the preservation of rare and highly specialised micro-fungi of Kenyan plants.

Professor Paul Kiprono Chepkwony, the incumbent governor of Kericho County has declared in a Kenyan comedy show, Churchill Show (hosted in Tea Hotel Kericho in 2018) a lengthy list pending and granted patents on various fields of Biochemistry.

Professor Moses King'eno Rugut is a Kenyan Research Scientist and the current C.E.O of the National Commission for Science, Technology and Innovation. He sits in the board of National Quality Control Laboratory, Kenya Agricultural & Livestock Research Organization, committee member on Drug Registration at Pharmacy & Poisons Board since 1999 and National Museums of Kenya. He also served as the Director General of the defunct KARI that was de-gazetted and was preceded by a newly established state agency KALRO and as Deputy Secretary at the Ministry of Higher Education, Science and Technology before being appointed the chief executive officer, National Commission for Science, Technology and Innovation. He was awarded Head of State's Commendations in the year 2008 for his distinguished service to the nation and subsequently awarded with the Order of the Grand Warrior, OGW in the year 2016 Prof. Moses Rugut has authored, co-authored or authored publications alongside other authors. Some of these publications include: Seroepidemiological survey of Taenia saginata cysticercosis in Kenya; Diagnosis of Taenia saginata cysticercosis in Kenyan cattle by antibody and antigen ELISA; Anthelmintic resistance amongst sheep and goats in Kenya and Epidemiology and control of ruminant helminths in the Kericho Highlands of Kenya.

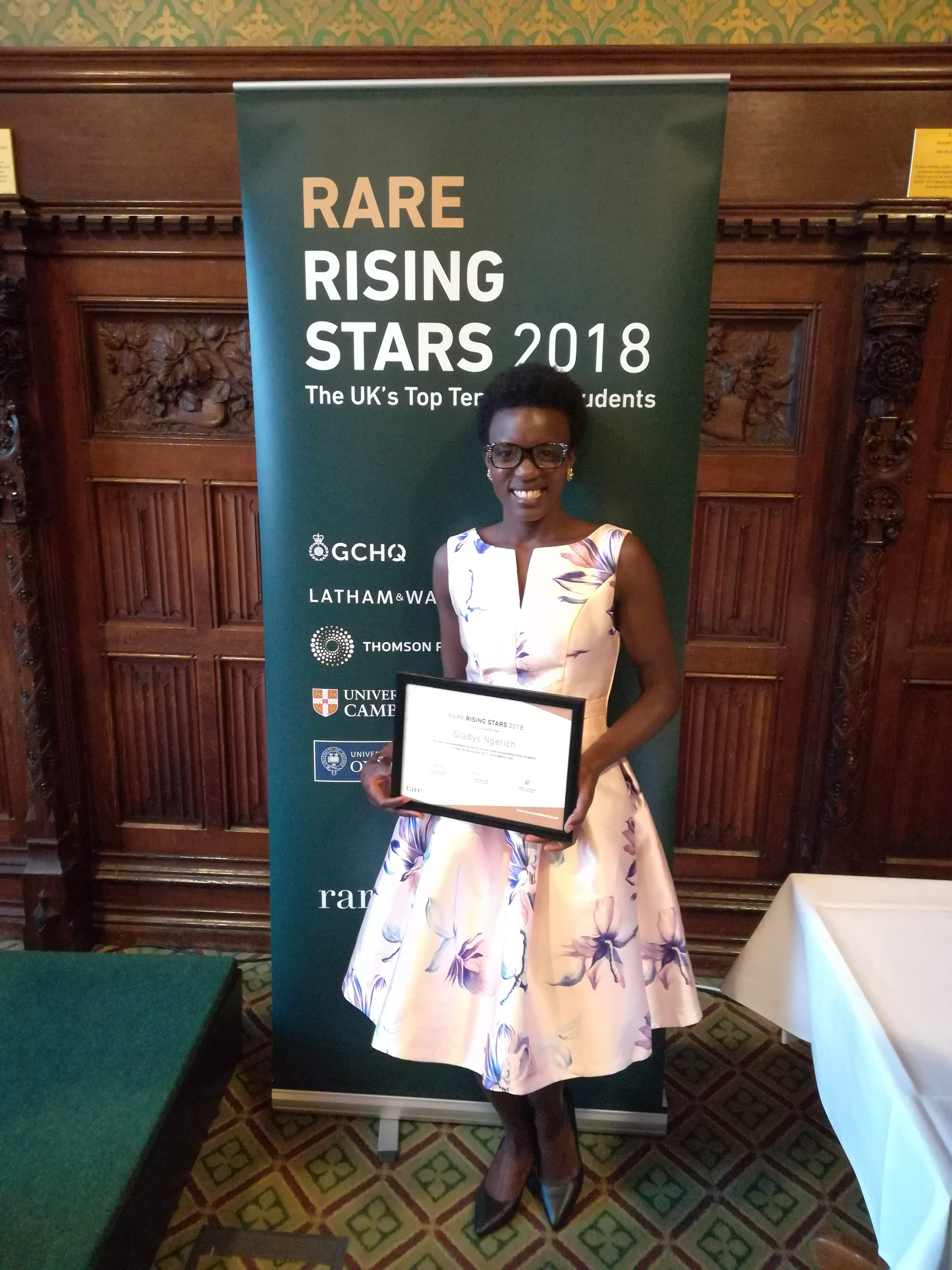
Gladys Chepkirui Ngetich at the Rare Rising Stars Awards of 2018

Gladys Chepkirui Ngetich is a Kenyan engineer of Kipsigis origin, and a Rhodes scholar pursuing a doctorate degree in aerospace engineering at the University of Oxford, in the United Kingdom. She is the recipient of the Tanenbaum Fellowship and the Babaroa Excellence Award. In 2018, Ngetich was credited with a patent in collaboration with Rolls-Royce Plc. Her research work has been in BBC Science and the Oxford Science Blog and Medium. She received the ASME IGTI Young Engineer Turbo Expo Participation Award, for her paper at the 2018 Annual American Society of Mechanical Engineers (ASME) conference. In September 2018, Business Daily Africa named Ngitech among its "Top 40 Under 40 Women in Kenya in 2018". In 2019 she started investigating sustainable space science using a Schmidt Science Fellowship. Ngetich is the co-founder of the ILUU, a Nairobi-based non-profit that aims to inspire girls and women.

Dr Richard Kiprotich Chepkwony is a Kenyan wildlife ecologist of Kipsigis origin and currently the Senior Assistant Director at the Kenya Wildlife Service and the State Department of Wildlife, Ministry of Tourism, Wildlife and Heritage. He hails from Cheborgei Bureti Sub-County, Kericho County. He studied at Chepsir Primary school in Kericho East. He was awarded a scholarship by the Interdisciplinary Research Fund INREF-CCGIAR-EVOCA programme in 2016 to the Wageningen University and Research (WUR) in the Kingdom of the Netherlands, from where he obtained his doctorate degree in wildlife Ecology and Innovations in 2021. He is an alumnus of Kaplong Boys' High School in Bomet County and Moi University Eldoret, Kenya, where he obtained his bachelor's and Master of Science degrees in wildlife management and Ecology. He has also studied environmental sciences at Tokyo International centre, Japan; Information technology at the Kenya School of Government; Kenya Wildlife Service Law Enforcement Academy-Manyani, among others. He has published widely in the fields of ticks and tick-borne diseases, technology and innovation, Spatial biopolitics of infectious disease control, human-wildlife interactions and Plant Ecology. He is supervising PhD and master's students from Wageningen University and Research. He has a vast knowledge of human-wildlife coexistence, spanning more than 23 years.

== Politics ==
=== Prominent leadership ===
==== Presidency ====
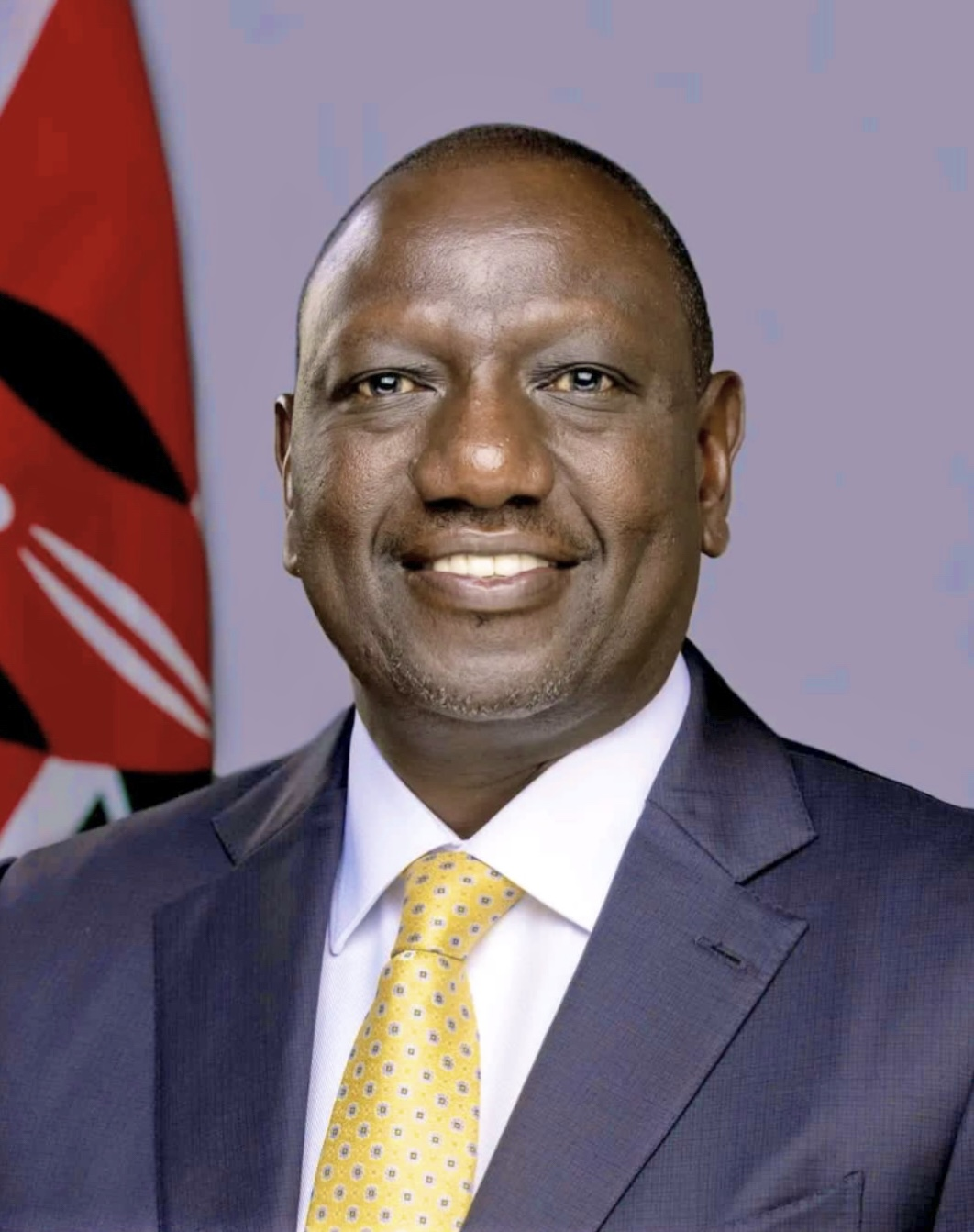
William Kipchirchir Ruto, the 5th President of Kenya

The Kipsigis sub-tribe has historically sought representation at the highest levels of Kenyan governance. President William Samoei Ruto, who traces his paternal lineage to the Kipsigis (Komosi clan) and his maternal roots to the Nandi community, became the first Kalenjin of Kipsigis descent to hold the presidency. His father, Daniel Cheruiyot, was of Kipsigis descent from the Kamagut area (originally with roots in the Komosi/Kapkomosek clan from Kericho). His mother, Sarah Cheruiyot, is Nandi. Making him a mixed Kipsigis/Nandi. Ruto previously served in various ministerial positions and as the Deputy President of Kenya (2013–2022). Following the 2022 general election, he was declared the winner; the results were subsequently upheld by the Supreme Court of Kenya following a challenge by Raila Odinga. Ruto was inaugurated on 13 September 2022 as the fifth President of the Republic of Kenya.

=== Community politics ===
The Kipsigis sub-tribe constitutes a significant constituency within the broader Kalenjin political landscape. Historically, during the transition to independence, the community supported Majimboism (a policy of ethnic-based regional devolution) under the Kenya African Democratic Union (KADU). Following the dissolution of KADU and the rise of Daniel arap Moi to the presidency in 1978, the community shifted toward a centralized political alignment in support of the Kenya African National Union (KANU) administration. During the 1990s, the Rift Valley region, including Kipsigis-inhabited areas, was noted in the Akiwumi Report for incidents of politically motivated ethnic clashes. During the presidency of Mwai Kibaki, the community's political influence underwent a transition, eventually consolidating under the leadership of William Ruto. Ruto’s ascent as a key political figure in the Rift Valley led to the community's strategic participation in various coalitions, including the Orange Democratic Movement (ODM), the Jubilee Alliance, and eventually the United Democratic Alliance (UDA) under the 'Bottom-Up' economic platform.

==== Ambassadors ====
1. Joshua Terer (KipKesbaek Clan): Education specialist, distinguished public officer, Ambassador of Kenya to Nigeria (1992-1995) Ambassador of Kenya India (1995-1999), Permanent Secretary (1999-2002)
2. Francis Sigey (Kibororek Clan): distinguished civil servant and Ambassador of Kenya to Nigeria and currently serving as a Member of parliament Sotik constituency

==== Speaker of Parliament ====
1. Moses Kiprono arap Keino (Kipkelesek clan): Third Speaker of the Parliament of Kenya from 1988 until 1991
2. Professor Jonathan Kimetet arap Ng'eno (Becherek clan): Fourth Speaker of the Parliament of Kenya from 1991 until 1993
3. Joyce Cherono Laboso: Deputy Speaker of the National Assembly of Kenya, between 2013 and 2017.

==== Cabinet Ministers and Cabinet Secretaries ====
There have been a number of cabinet ministers and cabinet secretaries from the Kipsigis community. A number of them include

1. Dr. Taaita Towett (Zoigoeek Clan): Labour and Housing (1961), Lands, Survey & Town Planning (1962), Education (1974) and Housing and Social Services (1974)
2. Prof. Jonathan Kimetet Arap Ngeno (Bechereek Clan): Education (1974), Housing and Social Services
3. John Koech: East Africa Community
4. Franklin Bett (Moochoeek Clan): Roads and Transportation
5. Davis Chirchir: (Bechereek Clan) Engineering and Petroleum (2013–207)
6. Eng. John Mosonik(): Transport (2013–2017)
7. Charles Keter: Energy (2017–2022)
8. Aaron Kipkirui Cheruiyot: Majority Leader of the senate (2022–current)

==== Permanent Secretaries ====
There have been a number of permanent secretaries from the Kipsigis community. A number of them include:

1. Zakayo Cheruiyot: Permanent Secretary in the Ministry of Internal Security (Office of the President) (2002)
2. Joshua Terer (KipKesbaek Clan): Education specialist, distinguished public officer, Permanent Secretary, Ministry of Home Affairs, Ministry of Labour (1999-2002)
3. Dr. Paul Ronoh : State Department for Water and Sanitation (previously Agriculture).
4. Festus Ngeno: State Department for Environment.
5. Aurelia Rono: State Department for Parliamentary Affairs

==== MAU Settlement Programs and evictions ====
The Kipsigis initial settlement was at Tulwaap Kipsigis in Londiani; strategically, the hill makes up part of the Mau Forest reserve in Kenya. The Kipsigis believe they have a 'god-given' claim upon the forest which alludes to the adoption at some point in the Kipsigis history of the aboriginal hunter-gatherer tribe, the Okiek who are native to a region between Mount Kenya stretching up all the way to Mau Forest in Rift Valley. Mau crisis started when the trust land was allocated to group ranches between the 1980s and 1990s who were mainly ethnic Maasai elite during Daniel Moi's Kanu era. The problem exacerbated about when the group ranches went beyond the cutline and occupied forest land. Part of the Mau Forest was initially a trust land under the defunct Narok County Council. Traditionally, the forest has been inhabited by the Ogiek. However, due to immigration from other ethnic groups, large parts of the forest area were cleared for settlement. In 2004, the famous Ndungu Report listed these land allocations, terming them illegal and recommended their revocation of them. Some evictions were done between 2004 and 2006 without a resettlement option. In 2005, the government placed a caveat on all title deeds issued to claimants, saying they were irregularly issued.

In 2008, the Kibaki regime through the then Prime Minister Raila Odinga ordered evictions to be effected by October 2008 in order to protect the forest from destruction. The order was opposed by several Rift Valley politicians led by Isaac Ruto. The then Agriculture Minister William Ruto, proposed evictees be allocated land elsewhere. Later, Environment Minister John Michuki would reverse the order. Subsequently, in 2008, there was a political row over the resettlement of people in the Mau Forest who had been allocated land in the 1980s and 1990s.

== Redress for violations by British colonial government ==
In 2017, a consortium from the Kipsigis community organised by Professor Paul Kiprono Chepkwony and led by Karim Ahmad Khan sought redress for human rights violations committed by the British government during the colonial period. The plaintiffs were more than 100,000 ethnic Kipsigis victims and the members of Talai Clan.

=== Provisions for Oorgoiik ===
The Talai clansmen returned or continued to peacefully live with Kipsigis people after independence. After the campaign of AIM and Catholic church the Talai clansmen were sidelined and hated but today, they exist peacefully with the Kipsigis and take upon the identity of the Kipsigis equally like any other clansmen. Notably, the residents of Chepalungu constituency (today's Sotik and Chepalungu constituencies) voted in Tamason Barmalel, the grandson of Koitalel Arap Samoei, as their MP between 1969 and 1974.

Allocations of land made by the Kenyan Government under Taaita Towet and Daniel arap Moi to the Talai clansmen has been reported to be grabbed and commercialized by corrupt agents and thus, those living in Kericho live in hardship and poverty.

=== Conflicts and violence ===
While fairly known for a disposition to be welcoming and hospitable, the Kipsigis are also infamous in Kenya for having participated or led offensive stance during some of Kenya's ethnic violence where in some, ethnic cleansing was a characteristic. The overarching cause for this violence has primarily been discriminatory politics, land contentions and incitement. The Kipsigis amass into the Kalenjin group which in totality portray a united political alliance thus making them subject to discrimination and incitement. Secondary intrinsic factors for violence machinate through a condition of sinuosity jumbled up between historical injustices, conceitedness from historical precolonial war efforts and demographics where unemployment is rife among the youth and a majority of the population is disadvantaged and disenfranchised economically.

After a comprehensive risk assessment of social, economic and political factors that increase the likelihood of genocide in Kenya, the Sentinel Project for Genocide Prevention's May 2011 report identified several risk factors including; a low degree of democracy, isolation from the international community, high levels of military expenditure, severe government discrimination or active repression of native groups, socioeconomic deprivation combined with group-based inequality and a legacy of intergroup hatred among other risk factors.

==== 1992 skirmishes ====
In 1992, a series of events contributed to a feeling of uncertainty in Kenya, these events included widespread charges of government corruption that had brought halts or cuts in the flow of foreign aid upon which Kenya's economy depended on, and protests against the government of President Daniel arap Moi that resulted in police attacks on demonstrators. Forby, under diplomatic pressure, the KANU regime under Daniel Toroitich Arap Moi caved to the political demand and need for multi-party democracy. Prior to 1992 elections, because of their support for the nascent opposition, KANU affiliates incited Kalenjin against Kikuyu around the idea that Kikuyu were non-indigenous and had appropriated Kalenjin land. As a result, ethnic cleaning campaigns before during and after the 1992 general elections erupted in a bid out of spite for the out-group and phobia for the tribal claim on land. According to some accounts 779 people were killed and about 56,000 displaced.

==== 2008 post-election violence ====
In January and February 2008, following the 2007 Kenyan general elections, post-election violence spontaneously erupted throughout the country but in the Rift Valley province; the violence span out and evolved from acts of riots and protests to all out violence against the Kisii and Kikuyu communities who were affiliated to the President Mwai Kibaki's PNU party. A characteristic of the violence it seemed was to expel the out-groups but not necessarily to kill. There was also looting of businesses and firms run by the out-groups as well as on some government properties. The pattern of violence subsequently showed planning and organization by politicians, businessmen, village leaders and local leaders, who enlisted criminal gangs to execute the violence. This was particularly the case in Rift Valley and Nairobi. In Naivasha, Nakuru and the slum areas of Nairobi, Kikuyu gangs were mobilized and used to unleash violence against Luos, Luhyas and Kalenjins, and to expel them from their rented residences. In many instances the police action added to the violence, with considerable evidence that officers took sides and used terror tactics against slum dwellers. In some instances, sexual violence took the form of individual and gang rapes and female and male genital mutilation.

==== 2018 Maa-Kipsigis skirmishes ====
The Maasai and the Kipsigis have historically and traditionally antagonised each other right from and a period earlier than the Maasai era. This usually manifested as cattle raids, eventual battles and the subsequent southward thwarting and ejection of the Maasai. After Kenya's independence, there have been periodic tensions between the Maasai and the Kipsigis which have backgrounds in history and traditions and fuelled by political incitement especially during the elections period. Politicians have been said to fuel the clashes with their remarks, both in public forums and on social media. In 2018 for instance, Narok County Senator Ledama Olekina, part of the Maasai community, has been criticised for remarks about the evictions.

In 2018 particularly, the Uhuru government under the Minister of Lands evicted a section of the Mau Complex settlers who are mainly of Kipsigis ethnicity. The evictions were particularly forceful, inconsiderate, inhuman and without compensation. A major section of the Maasai leaders supported the evictions and are said or known to have committed hate speech. In the wake of the polarisation, the Maasai are reported to have attacked Kipsigis evictees and in retaliation, Kipsigis men in Narok and Bomet counties retaliated. The battles implored the use of crude or/and traditional weaponry including nuts (a nut used to fit to a screw fitted onto a wooden handle about a foot and a half long), spears, bows and arrows, swords and torches (or at least, petrol/gasoline and lighters).

Following the 2018 evictions and Maasai-Kipsigis clashes, several human-rights defenders came together to file a paper in protest of the human-rights violations committed by the Kenyan government in evicting people from the forests; it said in part, "The actions of the Government of Kenya in forcibly evicting tens of thousands of people from forests violates a range of human rights, which are contained in international instruments to which Kenya is a State Party." Kenyan lawyer Leonard Sigey Bett filed a petition with the International Criminal Court at The Hague in the Netherlands challenging the evictions. Environmental conservation groups generally support the eviction of people from the forest, but only if the exercise is done amicably and humanely.

== Bibliography ==
- A. C. Hollis. The Nandi: Their Language and Folklore. Clarendon Press: Oxford 1909.
- Ember and Ember. Cultural Anthropology. Pearson Prentice Hall Press: New Jersey 2007.
- Kosibon, Elijah Kipngetich (2018). An Oral Narrative about Kapchebereek Clan Among the Kipsigis People of Kenya to His Son Dr. Festus Kipkorir Ngetich. Unpublished.
- Burnette C. Fish and Gerald W. Fish: The Kalenjin Heritage; Traditional Religious and Social Practices: World Gospel Mission and William Carey Library. 1995, 1996.
- Manners, Robert A. The Kipsigis of Kenya: Culture Change in a 'model' East African Tribe. In Three African Tribes in Transition. Urbana, Illinois: University of Illinois Press, 1950.
- Mwanzi, Henry A. A History of the Kipsigis. Nairobi: East African Literature Bureau, 1977
- Ochardson, Ian Q. "Supernatural Beliefs of the Lumbwa." Political Record DC/KER/3/1. District Commissioner's Office, Kericho: 1918.
