= Richard Pope-Hennessy =

Major-General Richard Pope-Hennessy CB DSO
- Richard Pope-Hennessy in 1927
- Born: 18 August 1875; London, England, United Kingdom
- Died: 1 March 1942 (aged 66); London, England United Kingdom
- Military career
- Branch: British Army
- Rank: Major-General
- Commands: 4th Battalion, King's African Rifles; 1st Bn, the Oxfordshire and Buckinghamshire Light Infantry; 50th (Northumbrian) Division
- Known for: Sotik Massacre
- Conflicts: Second Boer War; First World War
- Awards: Companion of the Order of the Bath; Distinguished Service Order

Major-General Ladislaus Herbert Richard Pope-Hennessy CB DSO (18 August 1875 – 1 March 1942) was a British Army officer of Irish Catholic descent who served in both the Second Boer War and First World War. In 1905, he led a punitive expedition which resulted in the killings of 1,850 men, women and children of the Kipsigis tribe.

== Background ==
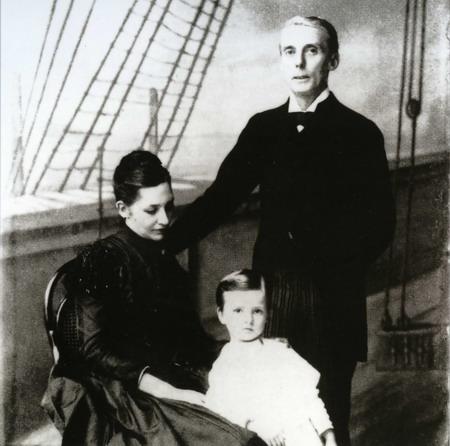
A young Richard, pictured with his parents

Pope-Hennessy was the eldest son of Sir John Pope-Hennessy MP, of Rostellan Castle, County Cork and Catherine Elizabeth Low. He was educated at Beaumont College.

== Military career ==
Pope-Hennessy was commissioned into the Oxfordshire Light Infantry in 1895. He was deployed to South Africa and served with the West African Frontier Force during the Second Boer War.

He was promoted to captain on 11 September 1902. In June 1905, in response to attacks on native Maasai people by the Kipsigis people in the East Africa Protectorate, Pope-Hennessy led an expedition to subdue the latter. During the expedition, Pope-Hennessy's men raided the town of Sotik, resulting in a massacre which involved the deaths of 1,850 men, women and children.

Following the success of the expedition, Pope-Hennessy, promoted to major in March 1906, was made commandant of the 4th Battalion, King's African Rifles in 1906 for which service was appointed a Companion of the Distinguished Service Order in 1908.

During the First World War he became commanding officer of the 1st Battalion the Oxfordshire and Buckinghamshire Light Infantry in Mesopotamia in 1916 and then became a staff officer with the British Indian Army in 1917.

After the war he was promoted to brevet colonel in January 1919 and, promoted again, now to colonel (with seniority backdated to January 1919), he served as a staff officer at the War Office and then was Military Inter-Allied Commissioner of Control in Berlin. Subsequently, he spent three years as military attaché in Washington D.C. He was promoted to substantive major general in August 1930 and became general officer commanding (GOC) of the 50th (Northumbrian) Division, a Territorial Army (TA) formation, on 20 February 1931, taking over from Major General Henry Newcome. He vacated command of the division on 20 February 1935 before retiring from the army on the same day.

Pope-Hennessy published a number of books an articles on military matters and in one of them he predicted the technique of the German Blitzkrieg.

== Political career ==
He took particular interest in military matters and in issues affecting his native Ireland. In 1919 he had published 'The Irish Dominion: a Method of Approach to a Settlement'. He was Liberal candidate for the Tonbridge Division of Kent at the 1935 General Election. Tonbridge was a safe Conservative seat that they had won at every election since it was created in 1918. The Liberal Party had not fielded a candidate at the previous general election and he was not expected to win and finished a poor third.

General Election 1935: Tonbridge Electorate 56,106
Party	Candidate	Votes	%	±%
Conservative	Rt Hon. Herbert Henry Spender-Clay	23,460	61.3	
Labour	F M Landau	9,405	24.6	
Liberal	Ladislaus Herbert Richard Pope-Hennessy	5,403	14.1	
Majority		14,055	36.7	
Turnout			68.2	
Conservative hold		Swing		

== Personal life ==
He married, in 1910, Una Birch a writer, historian and biographer. They had two sons, both of whom were gay: James, who became a writer, and Sir John, an art historian.

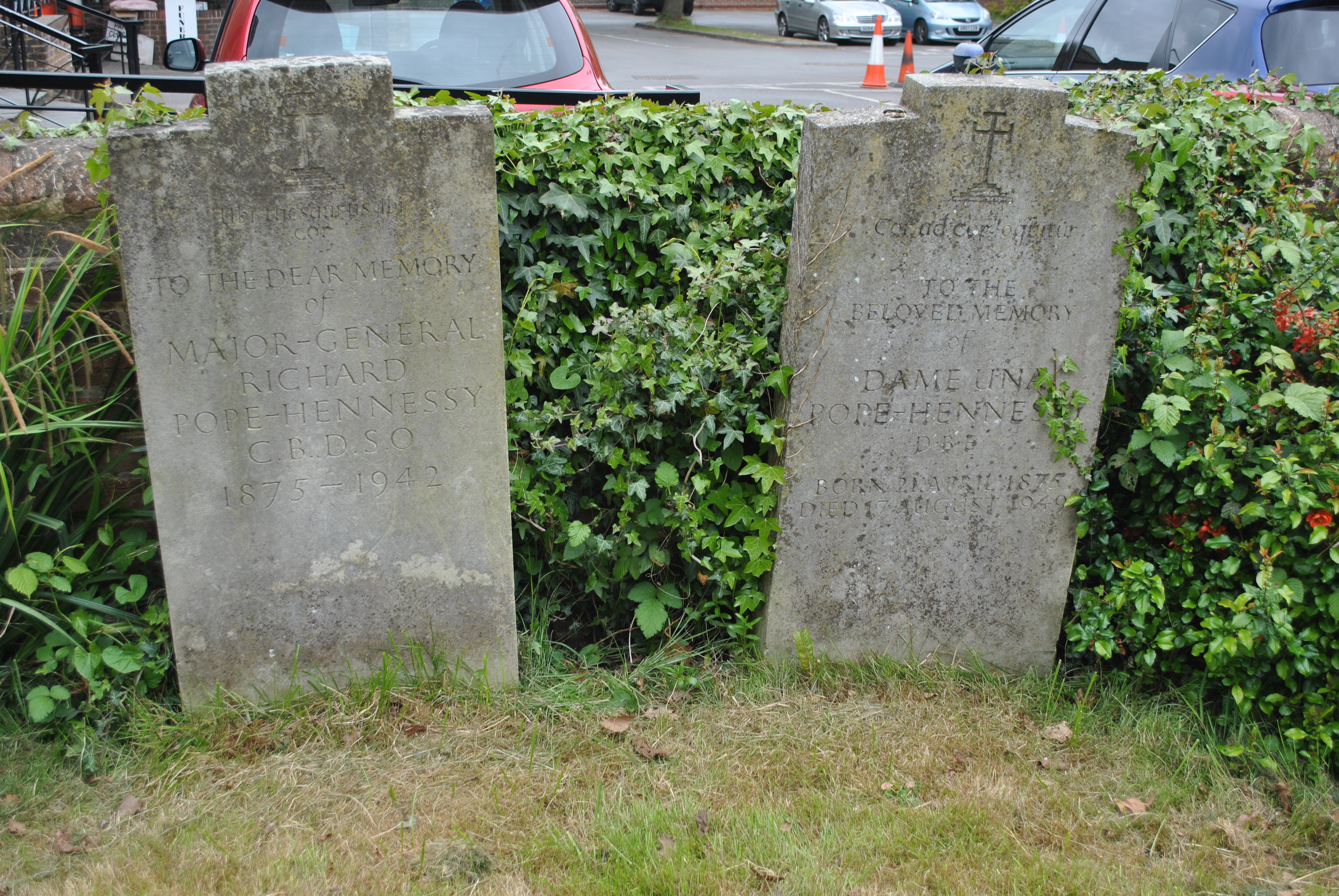
Friary Churchyard of St Francis and St Anthony, Crawley, 2017

Military offices
Preceded by Henry Newcome	GOC 50th (Northumbrian) Division; 1931–1935	Succeeded by William Herbert
