= Kipchamba =

Kenyan musician

- Birth name: Raphael Kipchambai arap Tapotuk
- Born: Kapsirich Village, Olbutyo, Chepalungu Constituency
- Died: April 7, 2007 (aged 70); Tenwek Mission Hospital
- Spouse: Esther Chepo Kapkweei (Married 1962) Ann Chepng’eno (Married 1972)

Raphael Kipchambai arap Tapotuk (1937 – 7 April 2007), better known by the stage name Kipchamba, was a Kalenjin singer-songwriter and musician who rose to popularity in the late 1970s. He specialized in rhumba sung in the Kipsigis dialect of the Kalenjin language. While performing as a singer, Kipchamba preferred wearing a suit and presenting himself in a formal slant. He was a charming and loving person

== Early life ==
Kipchamba was the firstborn son to Mugulaya Tapotuk arap Sitienei and Tapsabei Kobot Kipchamba. He was born in Kapsirich village, Olbutyo, Chepalungu in Bomet County in 1937. He briefly attended Kaplong Intermediate School, presently Kaplong Boys High School in Sotik and dropped out in 1955 due to lack of school fees.

In 1955, he was initiated as per Kipsigis custom of tumdo into Sawe age-set. Soon after, he moved to Njoro in Nakuru County where he worked at a European settler farm, and learnt how to play an acoustic guitar.

== Career ==
After leaving the service of his European employer, Kipchamba formed Koilong’et band together with some pioneering Kalenjin musicians. They started recording at Chandarana Records Limited in Kericho. When the Koilong'et band partnership collapsed in 1959, Kipchamba took a solo venture and went to record tracks. In totality, he recorded a little over 800 titles under his name.

Initiated in 1941 by the British administration under Information Department, Nandi broadcasts would air twice weekly and by 1957, 406 Kalenjin talk shows and 63 Kalenjin music pieces were recorded and aired, with most of these having been sung and written by Kipchamba.

Kipchamba acquired his status as a musician through a combination of dialectic and rhetoric, which alluded to constant sensibility, use and address of subtleties, which were fundamentally valued by his people at a time when no other person seemed to do so.
