= Lumbwa Treaty =

The Lumbwa Treaty event took place on 13 October 1889, in Lumbwa (Kipkelion town today,) in Kericho between the Kipsigis led by Menya Araap Kisiara and the Imperial British East Africa Company. It was based on a cultural practice of oath taking in Kipsigis called Mummek or Mummiat or Mumma. Mumma means "to do something impossibly disgusting". It involves two parties taking an oath and invoking a preemptive curse if the oath is to be broken by any party taking the oath. There usually would also be a performance of black magic; and on this particular event a coyote was savored in two halves with each party burying its part and making the oath never to harm each other in any way.

== Etymology ==
Lumbwa treaty derives from the word Lumbwa. Its origin dates back to the arrival of Ameru in Mount Kenya region. Upon their arrival, they interacted with what seemed to be two distinct communities speaking a Kalenjin-Ogiek language. One part of the community was associated with Sirikwa culture and more specifically, Sirikwa pits and thus the bantu speaking Ameru called them Humba, Humbua and Lumbwa. The description of these two communities coincides with similar oral tradition for a group of communities that were referred to as Oropom, Jenqwel, Sirikwa, Sengwer, Sikker among others. These descriptions can describe Iraqw people and Datoga Kalenjin who used to live in association with each other, with Iraqw known for elaborate irrigation systems especially in Lake Baringo area and as well as the building of fortified cattle settlement in what is otherwise termed Sirikwa holes. On the other hand, the Datoga Kalenjin are known to have had a mutual and peaceful correlation with the Iraqw. These communities and their interaction can be considered in a major part as the Stone Bowl cultural complex. These two communities would by the 19th century be replaced in territory by the Maasai, Nandi and Kipsigis.

As the Europeans arrived and surveyed the region, the Kipsigis unlike the Maasai, seemed to widely practice farming of eleucine and took up territory that would have been Sirikwa's. This led them to believe the Kipsigis were the outspoken effete Lumbwa and at the same time, they didn't seem to understand the different Kalenjin tribes, calling them in totality the Nandi. The Kipsigis were also referred to as Parakuyo, Kwavi and Soti or Sotik. In effect, with the Kipsigis being known to the British as Lumbwa, and the treaty being between the Kipsigis and the British, the treaty was thus named Lumbwa and the place it took place, a rail station being named Lumbwa town.

== The Treaty ==
Leading up to the treaty on 13 October 1889, The Kipsigis led by Kipchomber Araap Koilegen had proven hostile to the British contact and along with the Nandi, had managed to persistently inflict raids upon white outposts. This was as a result and implication of Kimnyole Araap Turukat's prophecies and partly because the Kipsigis were exasperated by Indian coolies taking Kipsigis girls to their base in Kericho town. The British sought to reprise the Kipsigis by way of intimidation where they displayed the fire power of their arsenal in Belgut; as a result, and as advised by Koilegen, the Kipsigis decided to make peace with the British. It was thereby decided as per the heritage of the Kipsigis that they should make a declaration under a custom that all would abide by, the custom of Mumma.

In what is today Kipkelion town in Kericho, the community and British party congregated to make the treaty. A dog was severed in two halves with the two parties burying their half and making the proclamation to uphold mutual trust not to fight or harm.

== Aftermath ==
the British East Africa government carried out a punitive expedition upon the Kipsigis for having undertaken a raid upon the Maasai. The expedition dubbed Sotik expedition resulted in a massacre of about 1800 ethnic Kipsigis and their cattle confiscated. The same year, after the murder of Koitalel arap Samoei, like the Nandi, the Kipsigis were devastated.
