= Sotik =

Town in Kenya

- Town
- Sotik
- Location within Kenya
- Coordinates: 0.68°S 35.12°E
- Municipality: Sotik
- Town Centre: Sotik
- Town extensions: Kaplong town, Chebilat town
- Suburbs: Chemagel, Kachepkoro, Kimase and Manaret

Population
  - Estimate: 10,000
- Postal code: 20406

Sotik town is an urban centre situated in Sotik Sub-county within Bomet County in the Western region of Kenya and managed by Sotik Town Council. Initially, it was the home of Mugenik Barngetuny Araap Sitonik, a prominent Kipsigis prophet of the late 19th century. Sotik is a metropolitan town with a majority of the residents from the Kipsigis ethnicity and a minority being from other ethnicities from Kenya including Somalis and Indians. The town is home to Kalenjin music artist Philip Yegon; Kenyan athletes Paul Kipsiele Koech and Mercy Cherono; and Kenyan politicians Lorna Laboso and the late Joyce Cherono Laboso.

== History ==
The establishment of Sotik town began with the arrival and settlement of the British colonialists in Kenya; Sotik being part of Lumbwa reserve that was annexed from the Kipsigis after Sotik Massacre in 1905. Afterwards, a police outpost was created with a single police officer in the post. Also as a result of the massacre and punitive expedition, a gang of 1000 natives, a fine and sale of 20,000 head of cattle was used to construct roads in the Lumbwa reserve which makes up what is today's Sotik-Kericho highway; additionally, local labour from the natives helped construct the bridges in Sotik. Sotik by the 1930s was projected and mandated to become an administrative outpost as Chepalungu reserve was opened for cattle grazing to the natives as a mitigation for expulsion of the natives from Sotik and most of today's Sotik constituency became part of Kenyan White Highlands where tea growing, dairy farming, cotton farming and maize farming was practised. In pursuit of a thriving self-sustaining township, the British administration and the local administration set aside 917 acres of land for establishment of the urban area with the following provisions: 500 acres of residential and business plots, streets, gaol, sanitation yard, municipal labour compound, water works, cemetery, churches, town hall, market, police station, native area, recreational grounds, railway station, war department, P.W.D yard, magistrate court and posts and telegraph. Additionally, the adjacent Kipsonoi river was projected to become a water source for the urban area as well as a power source as they hoped to construct a HEP power dam and exponentially, a creamery, maize mill, builder's yard, brick field, coffee curing works, sawmills and automobile engineering station.

Although some of the projections for the town had not come to fruition viz HEP dam, military yard and railway station by the time of Kenya's independence in 1963, many other projects had been completed.

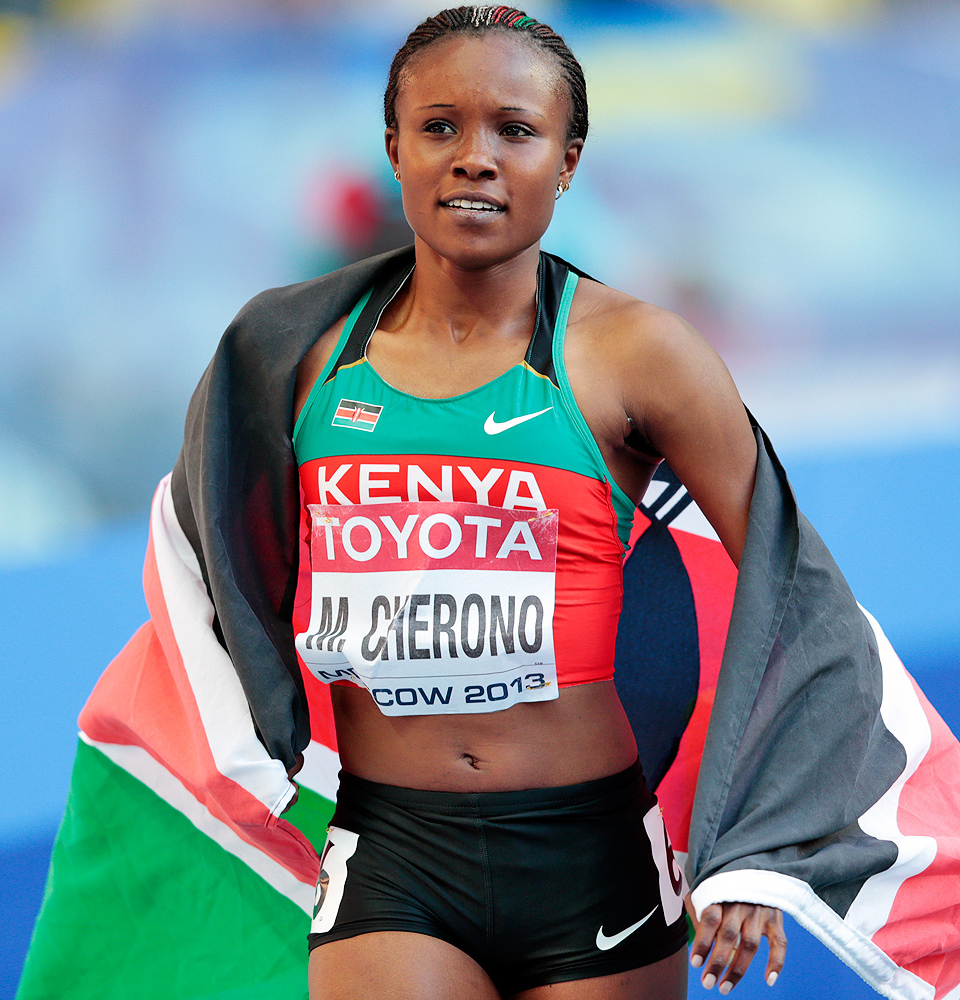
Mercy Cherono, athlete from Sotik

Between December 2007 and February 2008, following Kenya's general elections of December 2007, post-election violence erupted and as a result, the town witnessed violence with records of rape, murder, arson and looting. This negatively impacted the town and held back its growth for a number of years.

== Governance and management ==
Before the constitution of August 2010, local government was provided for by the Local Government Act 1977, and not enshrined in the constitution. Sotik was mandated a town status and as such, it had a town council which managed roads, waste collection and disposal, revenue collection and burial of the destitute.

In November 2021, State department for Housing and Urban Development Principal Secretary Charles Hinga Mwaura, revealed that Sotik town was qualified to be upgraded to Municipality and the formation of municipality should be 10 kilometers in radius from the center of the town which the center is near postal office or kenya commercial bank.This development was set to improve the quality of the area in terms services provision that would be overseen by a board, since the Mayor position was not included in Kenya's 2010 constitution.

== Economy ==
Sotik is adjacent to Sotik tea farms, Sotik tea estates and Sotik tea companies. Evergreen tea factory is also situated next to the town. The town is home to a New KCC creameries factory. Within town, there's a Kenya Farmers Association depot, an NCPB storage unit and a Kenya Animal Genetic Resources Centre outlet. The town has branches of Kenya Commercial Bank, Equity bank, Kenya Women Microfinance Bank and Bureti Tea Sacco as well as table-banking and lending firms outlets including Platinum Credit and Watu Creditors. The town has a number of supermarkets, hotels, eateries, and small businesses dominating the town.

== Amenities and infrastructure ==
The town has a district health centre within the town and St. Claire's Kaplong Mission hospital; as well as a sports ground and a cemetery. There are a number of government primary and secondary schools (including Kaplong Boys' High School and Kaplong Girls' High School) as well as private schools and a satellite campus for the University of Kabianga. The Sotik Technical Training Institute is also located in the town.
