= Emily Chepchumba =

2012 song by Bamwai

"Emily Chepchumba" is a love song written and recorded under the same record label name by the Kalenjin secular local musician Bamwai. It is sung in the Kipsigis dialect of the Kalenjin language. The song was inspired by a young beautiful Elgeiyo woman the musician met at Kaptarakwa in Elgeiyo-Marakwet in Western Kenya in 2004. The girl asked him to compose a song about their love. It is a song about two lovers separated by long distances, the longing and the desire by the two to meet again. In contrast, the home of Bamwai and the home of Emily Chepchumba can be approximated to only 250 kilometers and thus, socio-economic themes are manifested in the song. The song has gone on to earn a reputation in Kenya and Uganda as personifying the Kalenjin people as it is a timeless favourite among Kalenjin-speaking people as well as a go-to track in the Kenyan pop culture.

== Reception ==
After its release, it was commercially successful among the Kalenjin speakers in Kenya and Uganda. Kalenjin radio stations played the track for a number of years at their top of the charts. The Kenyan long-distance runner Ezekiel Kemboi danced to the song during the 2011 World Championships in Athletics in Daegu, after crossing the finish line in the 3000 metres steeplechase and during the 2012 Summer Olympics held in London in August 2012, after crossing the finish line in the 3000 metre steeple chase finals and winning gold. By associating the song with his wins, Kemboi made the song a symbol of Kalenjin community prowess and pride in athletics.
