= Bamwai =

Philip Yegon
- Born: August 1972 (age 53); Sotik, Western Kenya
- Occupation: Singer-songwriter
- Member of: Moto Moto Band

Philip Yegon (born August 1972) known by the stage name Bamwai, is a Kenyan singer-songwriter from the Kipsigis tribe which is contingent of the Kalenjin ethnic group and is celebrated and famed for writing and singing the sensational Kalenjin signature hit-song, “Emily Chepchumba”.

== Early life ==
Yegon was born, raised, educated and lives in Sotik in Western Kenya. His musical journey began when he dropped out of secondary school in 1987 after his father's demise. Yegon initially opted to become a shoe shiner where he saved enough money to purchase a guitar and began to master music skills. Later on, while working as an attendant in an eatery, he interacted with clients who were musicians who then introduced Philip into the music making process.

== Career ==
In 1989, he recorded his first song title and shortly after, made an acquaintance with a media presenter from the Kenyan national broadcaster working in an ethnic languages radio division who aired the song and earned Bamwai overnight fame and recognition.

Bamwai is the band leader of Moto Moto Band.

== Family ==
When Philip Yegon made an entry into the music scene, bursting into the then nascent secular local music, he was subject to some criticism as the community is constantly struggling with projections and ideologies set in motion in the colonial era by the church and the government to the effect that African cultural or secular heritage was unrefined, undignified and primitive if not to say evil. This attitude was particularly rife in the 1980s and 90's at a time when HIV/AIDS was getting community attention and secular lifestyle was attributed to most infections; More so, the attitude manifested itself against Yegon at a personal level and it ultimately led to a divorce with his first wife.

== Legacy and Reverberation ==
The Kenyan long-distance runner Ezekiel Kemboi danced to Bamwai's hit single, Emily Chepchumba during the 2011 IAAF Daegu World championship, after crossing the finish line in the 3000 metres steeplechase and during the London Summer Olympics held in August 2012, after crossing the finish line in the 3000 metre steeple chase finals and winning gold, thrusting Bamwai's hit song into the Kenyan pop culture.
