= Isaac Ruto =

Kenyan politician

Governor of Bomet
- In office March 2013 – 22 August 2017
- Deputy: Stephen Kipkoech Kimutai
- Preceded by: office established
- Succeeded by: Joyce Laboso

Minister for Vocational Training
- In office 2001–2003
- President: Daniel arap Moi
- Preceded by: Kipkalya Jones
- Succeeded by: Office Abolished

Assistant Minister for Agriculture
- In office 1999–2001
- President: Daniel arap Moi
- Minister: Chris Obure

Assistant Minister for Education
- In office 1997–1998
- President: Daniel arap Moi
- Minister: Kalonzo Musyoka

Member of Parliament for Chepalungu Constituency
- In office 2008–2013
- Preceded by: John Koech
- In office 1998–2003
- Preceded by: John Koech
- Succeeded by: John Koech

Personal details
- Born: Isaac Kiprono Kimetit; 4 March 1959 (age 67) Chebalungu, Bomet County, Kenya
- Spouse: Esther Ruto
- Children: 3
- Education: University of Nairobi (BA)

Isaac Kiprono Ruto (born 4 March 1959) is a Kenyan politician. He is the Chama Cha Mashinani Party leader. He was elected the first governor of Bomet County in 2013 Kenyan general elections. He hails from Tumoi, Sigor in Chepalungu constituency and went to Tenwek High School where he proceeded to study Political Science at the University of Nairobi. He is also a former chairman of the Council of Governors in Kenya.

== Political career ==
Ruto joined active politics in the year 1997 and was elected as the Chepalungu Constituency member of parliament through Kenya African National Union. In 1998, Ruto was appointed as assistant minister in the Ministry of Education, a position he served until 1999 when was reappointed as an assistant minister to the Ministry of Agriculture. In 2001, President Moi appointed Ruto as Minister of Environment and Natural Resources.

In 2002 Kenyan general elections Ruto was defeated by Ambassador John Koech as a member of parliament Chepalungu Constituency.

In 2007 general elections, Ruto was elected for a second non-consecutive term as the representative for his Chepalungu Constituency on an Orange Democratic Movement ticket.

In 2013 general elections, Ruto was elected Bomet County governor on the URP ticket under Jubilee Coalition.

In April 2013, Ruto was elected the first chairman of the Council of Governors through consensus and vowed to fight for devolution. In 2017 he became leader of the Chama Cha Mashinani political party. In the year 2017 Ruto vied through Chama Cha Mashinani and lost his gubernatorial position during elections to the late Joyce Laboso who vied through Jubilee ticket.
