= Kipsigis =

Kipsigis may refer to:

- Kipsigis people, of Kenya
- Kipsigis language, a Nilotic language spoken by the Kipsigis people
