= John Koech =

Kenyan politician (1946–2025)

John Koech (1946 – 8 April 2025) was a Kenyan politician. He was cabinet minister for the East African Community in Kenya under President Mwai Kibaki and a member of parliament for the constituency of Chepalungu until December 2007 when he lost his parliamentary seat to Isaac Ruto, and dismissed from his cabinet post for supporting Raila Odinga against Kibaki.

Koech was also the Minister of Public Works under President Daniel Arap Moi. He died on 8 April 2025, at the age of 79.
