= Kalenjin mythology =

Mythology of the Kenyan Kalenjin people

Kalenjin mythology refers to the traditional religion and beliefs of the Kalenjin people of Kenya.

== Earlier religion and ancient deities ==
Ehret (1998) postulates that Kalenjin henotheism superseded an earlier belief system whose worship centered on the sky and dated back to the early Southern Nilotic period. Traces of this belief system were captured among the Pokot as late as 1911 though nowhere else among the Kalenjin were similar beliefs recorded. Other than being centered on the sky, the older Kalenjin religion featured a greater number of deities:

- Tororut: A Supreme God who made earth and caused the birth of mankind and animals and who ancestors of long ago are thought to have seen. He was perceived as being like man in form but with huge wings whose flash causes lightning (kerial) and the whirring thereof thunder (kotil). He was said to live above (yim) in a place with land, stock, ivory and every good thing. Tororut was perceived as an omniscient, universal father. All calamities that befell man were sent by him as a punishment to men for their sins.
- Seta (Pleiades): Tororut's wife
- Arawa (Moon): Tororut's first born son
- Ilat (Rain): Tororut's son
- Kokel (Stars): Tororut's other children
- Topogh (Evening Star): Tororut's first born daughter
- Asis (Sun): Tororut's younger brother, who was seen to be angry during the dry season
- Hoi (Spirits): were understood but did not feature significantly in the older religion.

The confusion of the period is captured in the same account:

...But others say, 'The only god we know is Ilat,' who is supreme and lord of life and death. Others again, say Ilat is the servant of Tororut, whose duty it is to carry water, 'and when he spills it, it rains'. Karole, the chief ki-ruwokin of the Suk, says that Kokel are the children of Ilat, who is the lord of death.

— Tiamolok (one of the oldest Suk/Pokot living in 1911)

== Religious pillars ==
The Asisian religion superseded older Kalenjin mythologies following contact with the Southern Cushities. Notably, the first man in its creation story is an Okiot. Three major religious pillars (the sun, thunder and lightning, and living spirits) were explained to have a bearing on Kalenjin religious beliefs. All these pillars are subsumed within Kalenjin fears and psychologies controlled by taboos and superstitions.

== Deities ==
Kalenjin natural philosophy describes two principal deities, Asis and Ilat. Among the southern sections of the Kalenjin however there are three principal super-natural beings since Ilat's dual nature is identified as two separate deities, Ilet ne-mie and Ilet ne-ya

=== Asis ===
Asis is also commonly referred to as supreme God. He lives in the sky and is supreme, omnipotent, and the guarantor of right. Among the Northern sections of the Kalenjin he is also commonly referred to as Tororut.

=== Ilat/Ilet ===
Ilat/Ilet is associated with thunder and rain. He is said to inhabit deep pools and waterfalls and that the rainbow are his discarded garments.

==== Ilet ne-mie and Ilet ne-ya ====
Among the Nandi, Ilet ne-mie and Ilet ne-ya respectively are good and bad thunder-gods. The crashing of thunder near at hand is said to be Ilet ne-ya trying to come to earth to kill people while the distant rumbling of thunder is Ilet ne-mie protecting man by driving away his name-sake.

Forked lightning is the sword of Ilet ne-ya while sheet lightning is said to be the sword of Ilet ne-mie.

== The Creation Story ==
The creation story varies slightly among the various Kalenjin sub-tribes, the account given here is from the Nandi section.

In Kalenjin natural philosophy all things are supposed to have been created by the union of the sky and the earth. In those first of days the Sun, who married the moon, proceeded to the earth to prepare the present order of things.

There he found or created Ilet who lived on earth in those days with an elephant, whom the Kalenjin believed to be the father of all animals and an Okiek who was the father of all mankind. The three rested on their sides and continued thus for a long time.

One day Ilet noticed man turn his head and he became suspicious but took no action. Some time afterwards though they found out that man had turned over completely on to his other side. Ilet could no longer contain his suspicions and said to Elephant, 'what sort of creature is this that can turn over in his sleep. He is a dangerous being'. Elephant looked at man and laughed saying 'but he is only a small creature, too tiny for me to worry about'. Ilet was scared of man however and he ran away into the sky.

The man, seeing him ran away was pleased and said: 'Ilet, who I was afraid of has fled. I do not mind the elephant'. He then got up and went into the woods and made some poison into which he dipped an arrow. Having cut a bow he returned to where Elephant was and shot him. The elephant wept and lifted his trunk to the heavens, crying out to Ilet to take him up.

Ilet refused however and said, 'I shall not take you, for when I warned you that the man was bad you laughed and said he was small.' The elephant cried out again and begged to be taken to heaven as he was on the point of death. But Ilet only replied 'die by yourself'. And the elephant died and the man became great in all the land.

== Places of worship ==
The Kalenjin traditionally did not build a structure for worship, "as it was felt that this would have reduced His power and would have limited it to a particular building". They did, however, have three main places of traditional worship.

=== Kaapkoros ===
Kaapkoros was the name for a hilltop set aside for worship by the Kalenjin. Kaapkoros was the Kipsigis term for it and derived from kaap meaning "the place of" and koros meaning "gift". Koros is also the indefinite form of korosyot, a bush which is a mild plant and gives off a pleasant odour when burned. When the Kalenjin or the various sections would settle at a place, one hilltop would be set aside for worship. As the tribe expanded and people moved further away from this point, other hilltops would be set aside as being sacred. Evidently, the first kaapkoros took place very soon after the Kalenjin settled in Kenya—or even long before that time. People gathered on average once a year at kaapkoros, where worship would be led by the priests, known as Tisiik.

=== Mabwaita or Korosyoot ===
Mabwaita is a term used by the Kipsigis section for the family altar or prayer tree which was positioned to the east of the house as one exited from the door. The Nandi and Keiyo sections called it korosyoot. This was a duplicate of the one at kaapkoros and was the centre for worship and ceremonies connected with the home and family.

The father of the home officiated for some ceremonies, such as those that involved his own family. Ceremonies involving more than one family, such as initiation and marriage rites, required a priest to officiate. Children of the families which needed his services would go to the home of the priest and ask him to come. In return, each family paid him a lamb or goat for his services.

=== Sach ooraan/Kimwocho ===
Sach ooraan is a Kalenjin term used for the intersection of two or more paths or roads. Sach ang'wan is used for the place where four paths or roads branch off.

Years ago when a crossroad was being used for a ceremony or practice, it was considered to be a shrine. It was remembered ever afterwards that the spot had been used for the removal of something bad. Children were not allowed to go near a shrine at an intersection. Casting a leaf at sach ooraan was a form of prayer to Asis to drive away disease.

== Resurgence ==
Asissian religion declined during the British colonial period in Kenya. This decline has recently been reversed by renewed interest in Kallejin traditions, culture and social norms and more and more Kallejins are now embracing their true religion.

== See also ==
- Kalenjin folklore
