= Sotik Massacre =

Massacre of Ethnic Kipsigis in 1905

- Sotik (Kenya)
- Location: Sotik, British East Africa
- Date: June 1905
- Target: Ethnic Kipsigis
- Attack type: Massacre
- Deaths: Between 900 and 1850
- Perpetrator: British East Africa Protectorate: Richard Pope-Hennessy
- Motive: Reprisal for a raid

In June 1905, between nine hundred (900) and one thousand, eight hundred ( 1,800) Kipsigis men, women and children were killed in a punitive expedition dubbed Sotik expedition by the colonial British government forces led by Major Richard Pope-Hennessy. This was as a result of a raid by the Kipsigis on the Maasai which saw the Kipsigis part with Maasai cows, women and children to which the government demanded redress and return of the spoils of the raid but to which the Kipsigis returned in insults and turned down the warning. In effect, this led to alienation of tribal land to what would become part of Kenyan White Highlands.

== The Kipsigis ==
The Kipsigis are one of Kenya's 47 tribes and together with Nandi, Tugen, Marakwet, Sengwer, Pokot and Sebei, they make up the Kalenjin ethnic identity. Their origin is estimated to about 18th century as a break away group from the Nandi which occupied southern portions of Nandi Hills and today's Kipekelion and Belgut constituencies in Kericho County. Their population would however multiply and due to their warring attributes, they would go on to assimilate many groups from Maasai, Luo and Kisii.

By late 19th century, their military efforts had seen the Kipsigis expulse the Massai, Luo and Abagusii and dispossessed their claim upon the land and looted their livestock and crops. This was especially as a result of military efforts and leadership by commanders including Menya Araap Kisiara and the three brothers of Koitalel Araap Samoei (Kipchomber araap Koilege, Chebochok Kiptonui arap Boisio and Kibuigut). By the time of the arrival of the British, the Kipsigis were exclusively occupying what is today's Bomet county, Kericho County, Narok West Constituency and parts of Nakuru and Nyamira counties.

== The Massacre ==
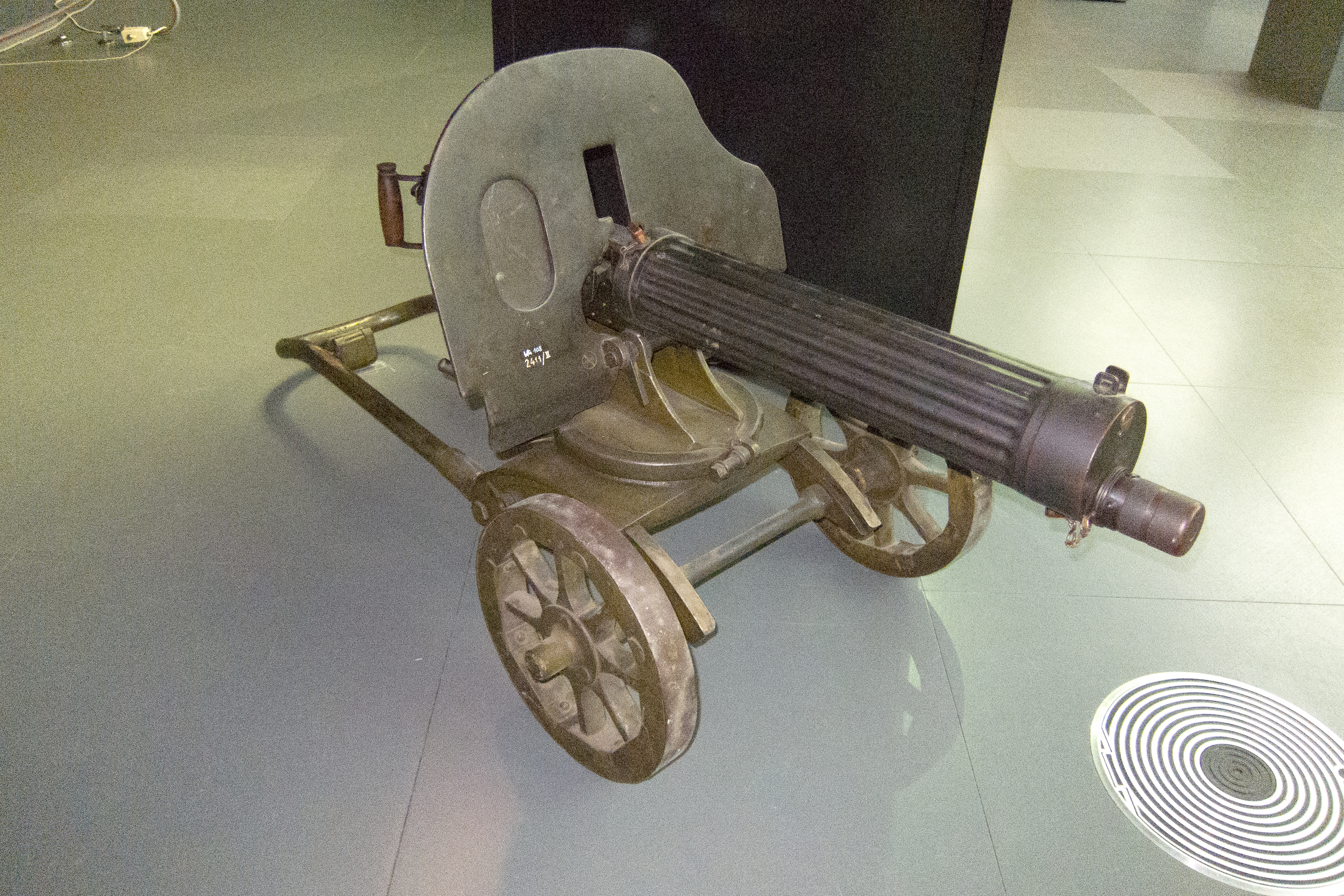
A curated maxim machine gun; similar to the one used in 1905 against Sotik residents; among other artillery employed.

Shortly after the creation of Maasai reserve and relocation of some of the ethnic Maasai as a result, the Kipsigis raided the Maasai and stole cattle, women and children. Attempts to negotiate the return of the Masai captives, and their cattle failed, and provoked The British East Africa Protectorate government to organise an expedition, against the Sotik. The punitive raid was led by Major Richard Pope-Hennessy and killed 1,850 men, women, and children. While recovering 20,000 head of cattle, along with a number of captive Masai Women and children.

The expedition was reported, in London, as follows:

In the spring of 1905, the Sotik tribe raided the Masai, capturing a number of women and children as well as a quantity of live stock. All efforts having failed to induce the Sotik to release their captives and to restore to the Masai the cattle raided, the Secretary of State for the Colonies sanctioned the employment of a military expedition to restore order by force of arms and to bring the country under administrative control.

The force under command of Major Pope-Hennessy, 3rd Battalion King's African Rifles, assembled in two columns at the end of May, as under:—

No. I Column at Njoro.—(Major Pope-Hennessy, 3rd K.A.R., in command). Three Companies, 3rd Battalion, King's African Rifles; 2 Maxim Guns. 3rd Battalion, King's African Rifles; Detachment 1st Battalion, King's African Rifles. 600 Masai levies.

No. II Column at Kericho.—(Captain C. L. Barlow, 1st King's African Rifles, in command). One Company, 3rd Battalion, King's African Rifles. 30 Rifles Police. 300 Lumbwa levies.

On 2 June, No. I Column marched from Njoro to Neilson's Farm on the Maumountains, whence, after establishing an advance base, it moved on 5 June into Sotik through a trackless primeval forest. Its advance was opposed on the Sotik border, but the enemy was defeated with trifling loss to the column.

A junction was effected with No. II Column, the advance of which had been unopposed, on 9 June at Sotik Post. As information respecting the enemy's numbers, fighting quality, and intentions was still vague, Major Pope-Hennessy decided to operate in one column until these points had been sufficiently cleared up by actual contact to justify movements with detachments, weak in themselves, but able to cover a wide extent of country.

On the 27th a flying column, preceded by strong patrols, moved into and worked out the Sakamnia district, returning to the Sotik Post on the 30th.

As it now became clear that the Sotik had received sufficient punishment, the force moved to Grey's Farm, near Molo. This march over steep hills and gorges covered with dense forest and bamboo jungle was a trying one to troops, levies, and porters, a road having to be cut for some 35 miles to enable the column, which, with its convoy, was seven miles long, to pass in single file.
The force was demobilised on 12 July. These operations have effectually established peace and good order in Sotik, and thrown this fine country open to colonisation.

The enemy's losses were severe. The Masai captives were released and the claims of that tribe on the Sotik made good. The force lost 1 man killed and 6 wounded; during the operations 14,711 rounds of rifle ammunition were expended and 614 rounds of Maxim ammunition. Major Pope-Hennessy reports that:—

"The behaviour of the rank and file throughout was good. I was particularly pleased with the remarkable marching of Captain Maycock's or No. 6 (Masai) Company, 3rd King's African Rifles, sections of which several times covered 40 miles in the day when supporting parties of Masai spearmen."

"Captain Jenkins' or No. 0 (Soudanese) Company, 3rd King's African Rifles set a good example to the rest of the force in discipline, smartness, and keenness for work."
In addition to the above named Officers Major Pope-Hennessy has brought to notice the good work of the followiiig:—

Mr. Partington, Senior Political Officer.
Mr. McClure, Assistant Political Officer.

Mr. Rayne, Transport Officer.

— "Sotik Expedition", The London Gazette (13 March 1908)

British East Africa called for peace negotiations between the Nandi and the British following a protracted 10-year long guerrilla resistance. Upon their meeting, Richard Meinheirtzhagen shot Koitalel Araap Samoei point blank in the head thus ending the resistance.

== Impacts and Implications ==
Following the attainment of the mission objectives and their success, medal of honours were awarded to officers who took part in the operation. The party had been allocated £20,000 but following their raid, they seized 20,000 head of cattle to which each was sold at £3 thus amounting to £60,000 which was £40,000 in profit. It was also as a result of both the assassination of Orkoiyot Koitalel Araap Samoei and the massacres of Sotik and Nandi that the British administration felt that all of Talai clansmen should be exiled. This operation saw hundreds of Talai clan members living among the Kipsigis evacuated to Rusinga island in Kisumu where many of them died due to malaria and became subject to pedigree collapse as there were no unrelated choices for pairing. Apparently, the three brothers of Koitalel were handed life exile in Fort Hall, Nyeri until their deaths.

== Redress ==
In August 2020, following the murder of George Floyd, Claudia Webbe, Member of Parliament for Leicester East wrote in a letter addressed to UK's Secretary of State for Education, Gavin Williamson about Sotik Massacre and asked that the massacre should be taught in British schools. In 2023, Kenyan Professor Paul Chepkwony stated:

"The Sotik massacre has been erased from the history books, not just of the United Kingdom but from Kenya as well. The slaughter of some 1850 men, women and children would today be classified as genocide and a crime against humanity. In 1905, Colonel Hennessey, used a Maxine Machine gun to conduct this slaughter. This massacre was used to terrorise the Kipsigi people and evict them illegally from their ancestral homeland. The colonialists justified this ethnic cleansing by stating that the 'well watered white Highlands were fit to raise a European child'. Approximately 100,000 Talai people were forcibly removed to Gwasi, which they knew was unfit for human habitation. This was heartless racism of the highest order."

== See also ==
- Herero and Nama genocide
- Atrocities in the Congo Free State
- Jallianwala Bagh massacre
