= Eldoret =

City in Uasin Gishu County, Kenya

- City
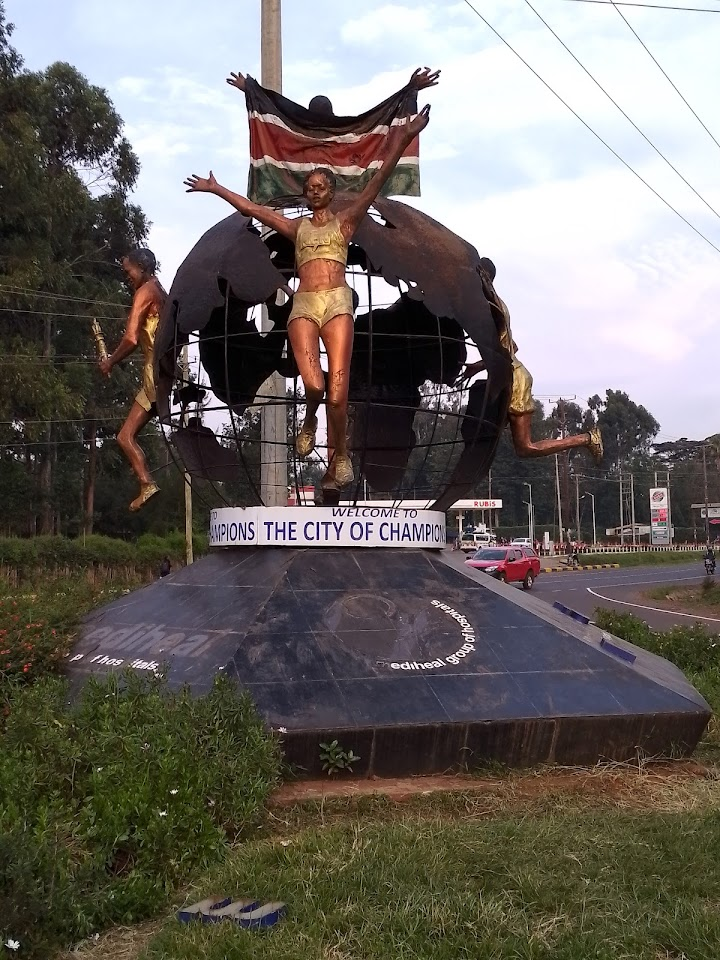
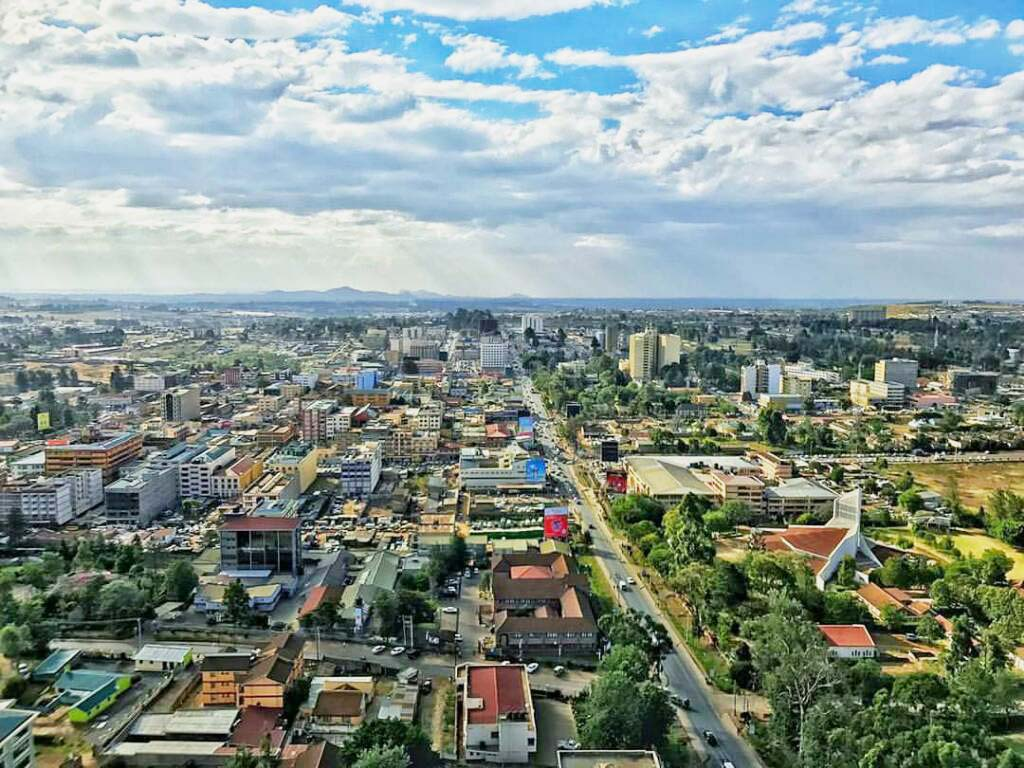
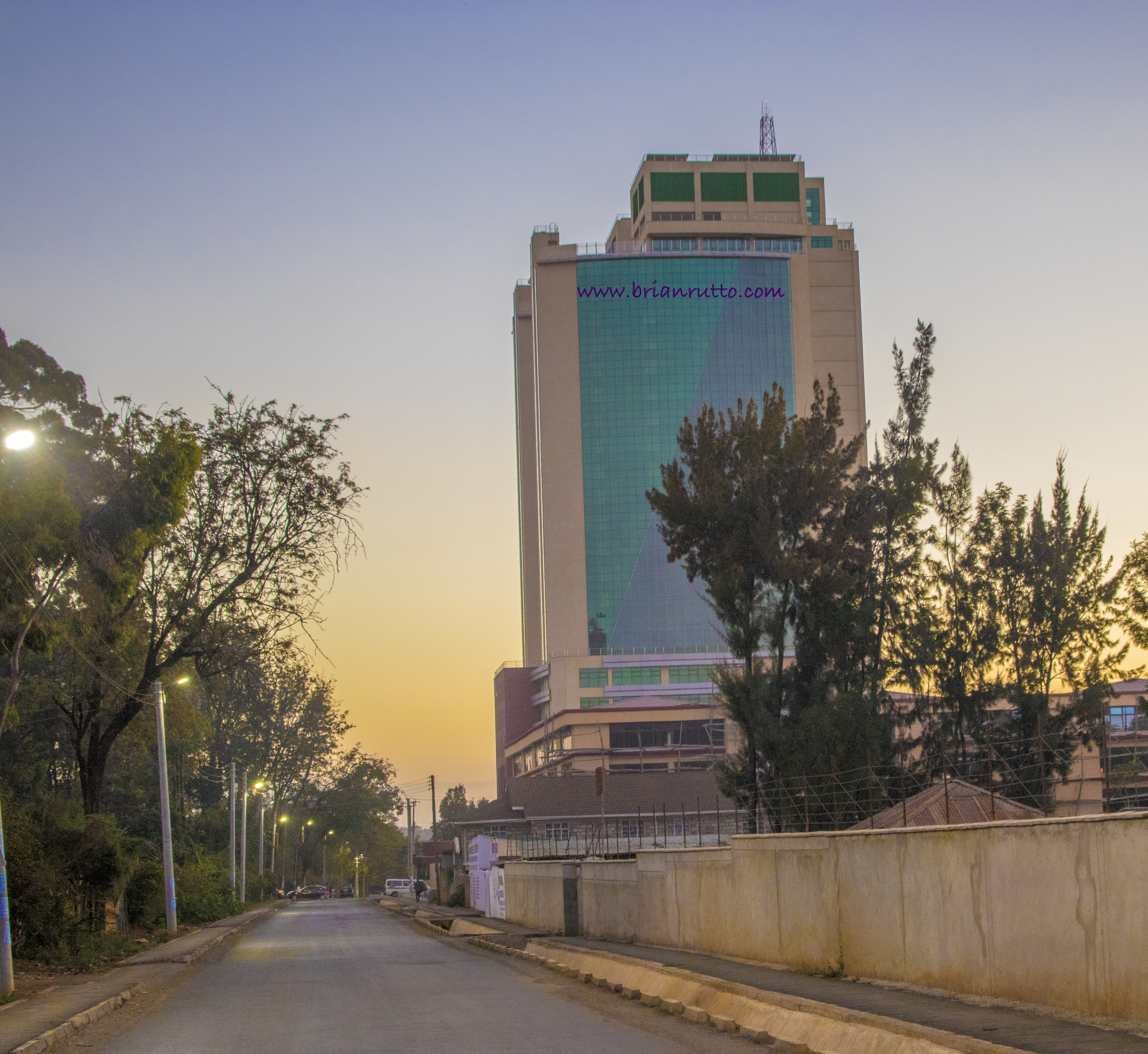
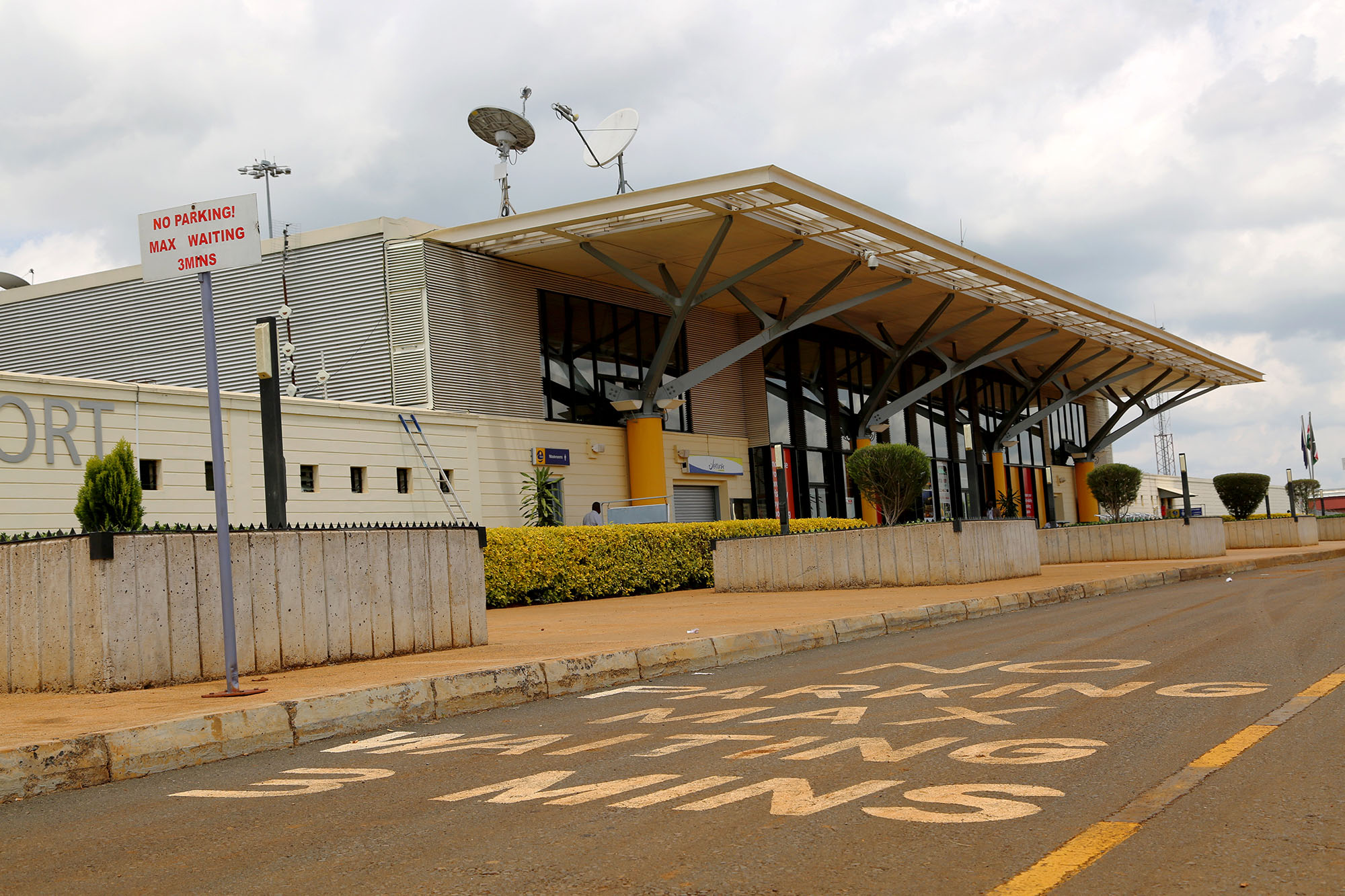
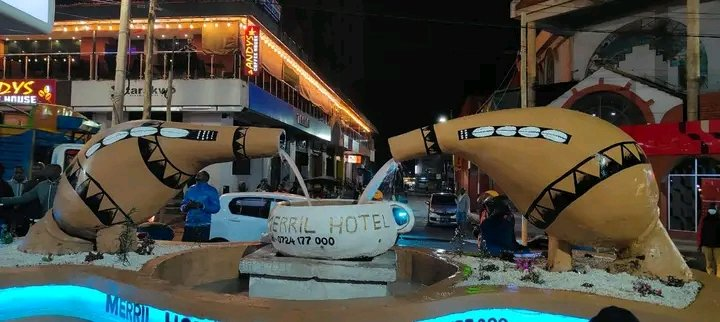
- Clockwise from top: City of Champions Monument, MUPS Daima Towers, Sotet Monument, Eldoret International Airport, Eldoret Skyline
- Nicknames: Sisibo, Farm '64'
- Motto: City of Champions
- Location within Kenya Location within the Horn of Africa Location within Africa
- Coordinates: 0°31′N 35°17′E
- Country: Kenya
- County: Uasin Gishu County
- Established: 1905

Government
  - Type: County Government
- Elevation: 7,200 ft (2,200 m)

Population (2019)
  - Urban: 477,716
- Time zone: UTC+3 (EAT)
  - Summer (DST): NO
- Post code, Postal code: 30100
- Area code: +254 53
- Climate: Cfb
- Website: https://eldoretcity.go.ke

Eldoret is a city in Uasin Gishu County and its capital. It is located in the Rift Valley region south of the Cherang'any Hills, the local elevation varies from about 2,100 metres (6,900 ft) at the Eldoret International Airport to more than 2,700 metres (8,900 ft) in nearby areas.

As per the 2019 population census, Eldoret has a population of 475,716 people and is the fifth most populated urban area in the country after Nairobi, Mombasa, Nakuru and Ruiru.

A long-standing municipality, Eldoret was conferred city status on 15 August 2024, making it the fifth city of Kenya after Nairobi, Mombasa, Kisumu and Nakuru.

The city is a significant urban area in Kenya; it is the second largest medical destination in Kenya after Nairobi and hosts the largest university student population outside of the nation's capital. Its international airport is ranked as the nation's second busiest cargo airport after JKIA in Nairobi and has the second largest coverage by financial institutions outside of the capital with over 40 branches in town. The city also hosts a substantial manufacturing sector.

== Etymology ==
The name "Eldoret" is based on the Maasai word eldore meaning "stony river", a reference to the bed of the Sosiani River, a tributary of the Nile that runs through the town. The city was referred to as Farm 64 or 'Sisibo', a derivative of '64', during the early colonial period.

== History ==
=== Early inhabitants of the region ===
The Uasin Gishu Plateau and surrounding highlands were historically inhabited by the Sirikwa, a sedentary pastoralist community remembered through oral traditions and early colonial-era ethnography. Although the term "Sirikwa culture" has since been adopted by archaeologists to describe a broader Late Iron Age agropastoral horizon (c. AD 1200–1600), the Sirikwa people themselves appear to have been a distinct clan or sub-group within this wider cultural complex.

Oral traditions—particularly among the Pokot, Kony, and Nandi—place the Sirikwa on the Uasin Gishu Plateau prior to their dispersal in the mid-19th century. These accounts describe the plateau as being shared by at least two distinct communities, indicating a segmented settlement pattern rather than exclusive Sirikwa occupation. Sengwer oral traditions, for example, recall the presence of both "Sirikwa and Mitia"—the latter possibly corresponding to the Mitei (Kalenjin) tribe referenced in early 20th-century Nandi sources.

Archaeologically, the Sirikwa are associated with a distinctive form of circular earthwork enclosure known as Sirikwa holes, alongside tumuli, irrigation channels, and occasional monolith structures. These features are especially concentrated in the western highlands of Kenya, notably in the modern-day counties of Trans Nzoia, Uasin Gishu, and Elgeyo Marakwet.

The way of life of the Sirikwa and related communities was profoundly disrupted during the 18th and 19th centuries by the movements of the Ateker confederacy. This period saw the rise of the Loikop society east of Lake Turkana, which later fragmented into three major groups—including the Maasai and the related Uasin Gishu people, who would come to occupy the plateau and lend their name to it. Following a series of internecine conflicts, the Uasin Gishu Maasai were eventually defeated in the late 19th century by the Nandi during their retaking of Uasin Gishu, leading to the absorption of surviving Uasin Gishu into the Nandi and other neighboring communities.

=== Early settlers ===
In August 1908, a group of 58 Afrikaner families, originally from South Africa, relocated from Nakuru and Mombasa to the Uasin Gishu Plateau. Led by Jan van Rensburg, they arrived at Sergoit Hill near present-day Eldoret on 22 October 1908. This location is now the site of a golf and wildlife resort.

The land had previously been surveyed by an individual named van Breda, and the settlers acquired leaseholds ranging from 320 to 2,020 hectares (800 to 5,000 acres), with the condition that they would improve the land within five years. Each family constructed basic shelters, enclosed their plots, and began ploughing the land using ox-drawn ploughs. They cultivated wheat, maize, and various vegetables—activities that would eventually transform the plateau into a key agricultural zone.

Over time, the farms were formally registered and assigned individual numbers.

The settlement that became Eldoret developed around what was initially known as "Farm 64", referring to its distance—103 kilometres (64 mi)—from the Londiani railhead on the newly constructed Uganda Railway. Locals referred to the area as "Sisibo". The land was originally owned by Willy van Aardt, whose former property is now partly occupied by the Central Lounge in Eldoret.

The foundation for the official town was laid in 1910 with the establishment of a post office at Sisibo. In 1911, an additional 60 Afrikaner families joined the earlier settlers. In 1912, colonial authorities designated the area as an administrative centre, prompting a surge in trade and the construction of commercial infrastructure including a bank and shops. The name "Eldoret" was then officially adopted.

=== Colonial period ===
The extension of the Uganda Railway from Londiani reached Eldoret in 1924, ushering in a period of significant economic and infrastructural development. A piped water supply from the Sosiani River was introduced in 1928, followed by the installation of an electricity generation plant by the East African Power and Lighting Company in 1933. By this time, Eldoret boasted basic urban infrastructure, including a small airport and government-built low-cost rental housing.

During the colonial era, Eldoret developed along segregated lines. In the 1950s, the town was informally divided along what is now Uganda Road: Afrikaner settlers primarily occupied the northern side, while British settlers lived in the south. This divide extended to education and recreation—Afrikaners sent their children to Highland School (now Moi Girls’ High School), while British families favored Hill School. Social life also reflected this division: the Afrikaners frequented the Wagon Wheel establishment, while the British preferred the Lincoln Hotel and the nearby Racecourse, located in what is now referred to as the “Chinese Area.”

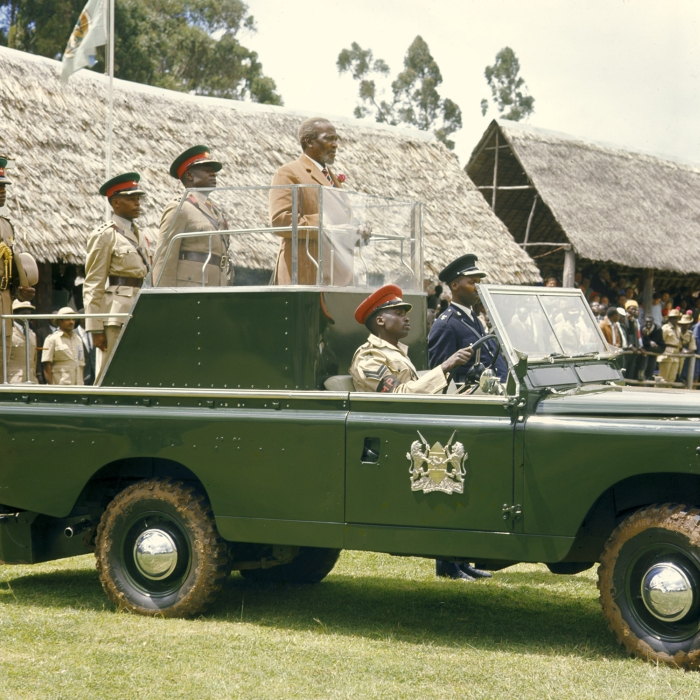
Kenya's first president, Jomo Kenyatta, opens the Eldoret Agricultural Show in 1968.

=== Post-independence ===
After Kenya's independence, Eldoret continued to grow, boosted in part by its association with key political figures. Daniel arap Moi, born in the neighboring Baringo District, oversaw substantial investment in the town during his presidency. In 1984, Moi University—Kenya's second public university—was established near the town, and Eldoret International Airport was later constructed, further enhancing the region's connectivity and economic stature.

By the late 20th century, the town's settler population—particularly the Afrikaner community that had once dominated parts of Eldoret—had largely vanished. Many Afrikaner families repatriated to South Africa during the transition to independence and in the aftermath of the Mau Mau uprising. By 1987, only a few Afrikaner households remained in the city.

=== Recent history ===
In the early 21st century, Eldoret was among the towns affected by the 2007–2008 post-election crisis that followed a disputed national vote. The violence led to significant displacement and loss of life in parts of the Rift Valley. One of the most widely reported incidents occurred near Burnt Forest, where a tragic fire at a church sheltering displaced persons resulted in numerous fatalities. The unrest marked a difficult period in the town's recent history.

Eldoret remains politically significant in Kenya's contemporary landscape. It is the birthplace of William Ruto, the current President of Kenya, who was born in Kamagut Ward, within Turbo Constituency, which borders Eldoret. Before ascending to the presidency, Ruto represented Eldoret North in Parliament, further anchoring the town's importance in national affairs.

== Climate ==
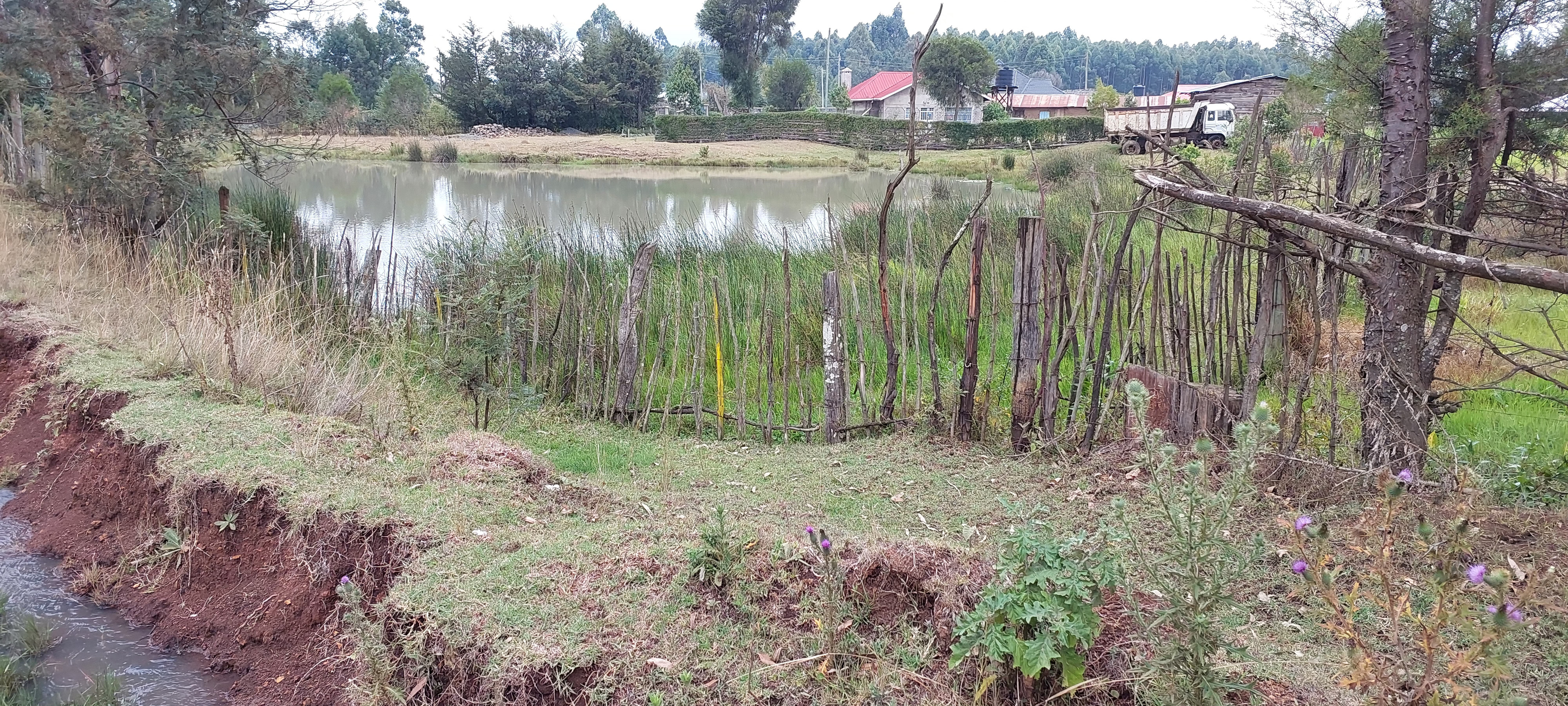
A swamp in Eldoret

Eldoret has a subtropical highland climate (Köppen climate classification Cfb). The town, lying over 2,000 m (6,600 ft) above sea level, has a moderate to cool climate. The temperature falls significantly at night, and in the cold season (May–August) it is regularly in the single digits Celsius. The warm season is the driest and the cool season is the wettest, making the town have a pattern similar to that of a Mediterranean climate.

Climate data for Eldoret, elevation 2,120 m (6,960 ft), (1991–2020 normas, extremes 1930–1968)
Month	Jan	Feb	Mar	Apr	May	Jun	Jul	Aug	Sep	Oct	Nov	Dec	Year
Record high °C (°F)	29.5 (85.1)	29.1 (84.4)	30.6 (87.1)	28.9 (84.0)	27.8 (82.0)	28.0 (82.4)	27.2 (81.0)	25.2 (77.4)	27.0 (80.6)	27.2 (81.0)	27.3 (81.1)	27.5 (81.5)	30.6 (87.1)
Mean daily maximum °C (°F)	23.9 (75.0)	25.6 (78.1)	25.3 (77.5)	24.5 (76.1)	23.3 (73.9)	22.4 (72.3)	22.0 (71.6)	22.2 (72.0)	23.6 (74.5)	23.1 (73.6)	22.8 (73.0)	23.3 (73.9)	23.5 (74.3)
Daily mean °C (°F)	17.3 (63.1)	17.8 (64.0)	18.4 (65.1)	18.1 (64.6)	17.4 (63.3)	16.7 (62.1)	16.2 (61.2)	16.3 (61.3)	16.4 (61.5)	17.5 (63.5)	17.2 (63.0)	17.0 (62.6)	17.2 (62.9)
Mean daily minimum °C (°F)	10.9 (51.6)	10.3 (50.5)	11.5 (52.7)	11.8 (53.2)	11.5 (52.7)	11.1 (52.0)	10.8 (51.4)	11.3 (52.3)	9.9 (49.8)	12.0 (53.6)	11.9 (53.4)	11.2 (52.2)	11.2 (52.1)
Record low °C (°F)	1.6 (34.9)	2.6 (36.7)	3.4 (38.1)	5.0 (41.0)	4.9 (40.8)	1.1 (34.0)	2.8 (37.0)	5.0 (41.0)	4.4 (39.9)	1.1 (34.0)	2.2 (36.0)	3.6 (38.5)	1.1 (34.0)
Average precipitation mm (inches)	29 (1.1)	40 (1.6)	57 (2.2)	150 (5.9)	124 (4.9)	104 (4.1)	172 (6.8)	196 (7.7)	87 (3.4)	48 (1.9)	50 (2.0)	46 (1.8)	1,103 (43.4)
Average precipitation days (≥ 0.2 mm)	5	5	8	15	15	13	19	21	11	9	9	7	137
Average relative humidity (%)	57	57	59	70	73	76	76	78	70	65	67	62	68
Mean monthly sunshine hours	276	260	267	243	233	228	183	180	225	242	222	273	2,832
Source 1: Deutscher Wetterdienst (precipitation, humidity and sun 1941–1968)
Source 2: Danish Meteorological Institute Starlings Roost Weather

== Population ==
Historical population
Year	Pop.	±%
1969	18,196	—
1979	50,503	+177.6%
1989	111,882	+121.5%
1999	167,016	+49.3%
2009	252,061	+50.9%
2019	475,716	+88.7%

== Local governance ==
Eldoret is governed by the County Government of Uasin Gishu which manages all the town's affairs. The city is divided into thirteen wards. Six of them (Huruma, Kamukunji, Kapyemit, Kidiwa/Kapsuswa, and Stadium/Industrial, Market) are in Eldoret North Constituency, three (Hospital, Kapsoya and Kimumu/Sergoit) are in Eldoret East Constituency, and the remaining four (Kipkenyo, Langas, Pioneer/Elgon View and Race Course) are part of Eldoret South Constituency. All of these three constituencies also have wards within other local authorities outside the Eldoret municipality.

=== Suburbs ===
Eldoret has a number of estates. Estates vary in that some are posh and others are resided in by the middle-class community. Almost every estate has its own identity. Some of the estates include Elgon View, Langas, Kapseret, Huruma, Kapsoya, Shauri, Kipkorgot, Kahoya, West Indies, West, Kipkaren, Kimumu, Jerusalem, Annex, Mwanzo, Hawaii, Action, Mailinne, Pioneer, Outspan, Kiplombe, Kamkunji, Samar, Silas, Kenya Service, Cheplaskei, Chinese, Road Block, Peris, Junction, Munyaka, Hillside, Eldoville, Juniorate among many others.

== Economy ==
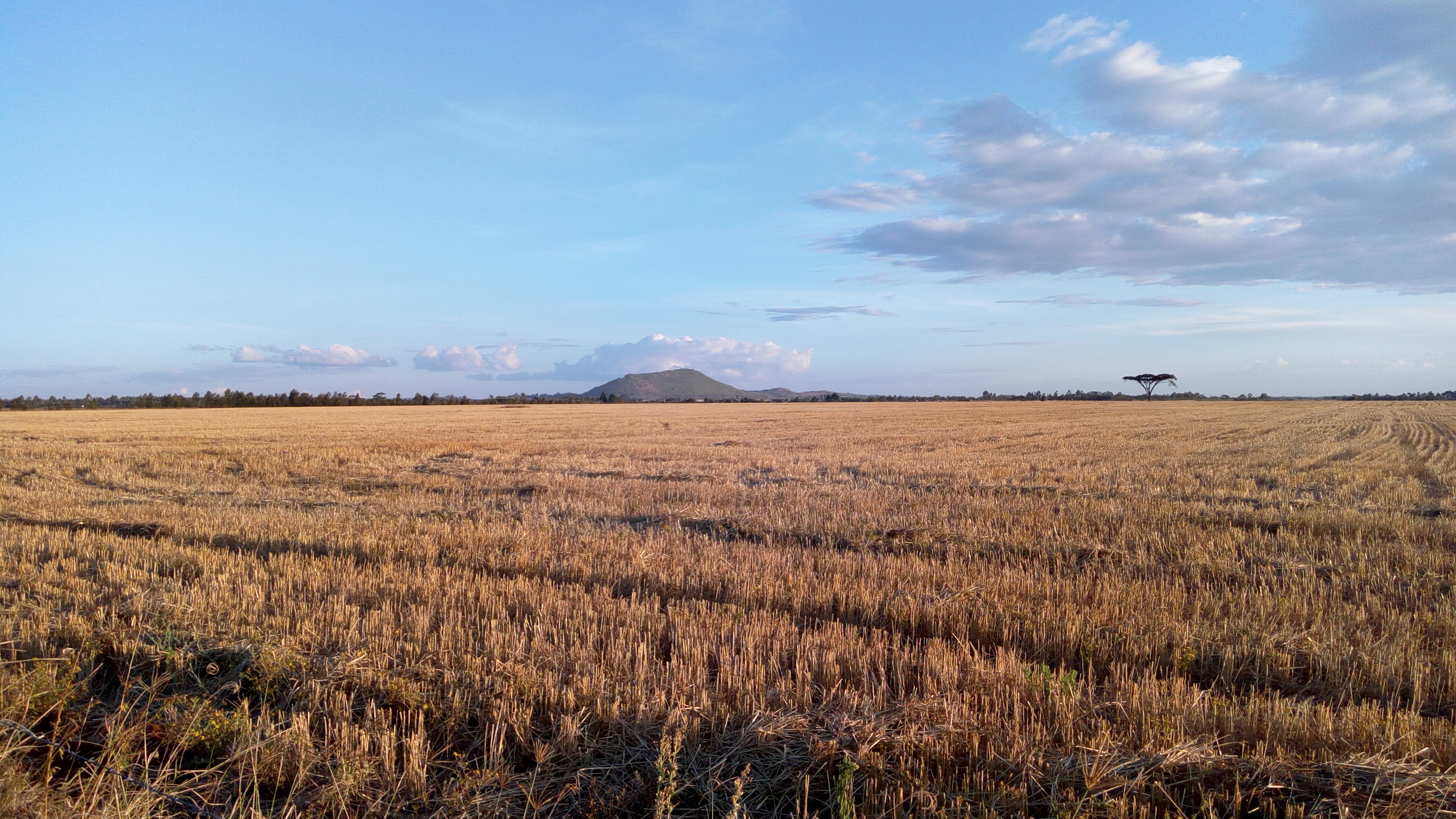
Large wheat plantation near Eldoret. Sergoit hill seen in the background

Eldoret is surrounded by prime agricultural lands and acts as a trading centre for Uasin Gishu's economy which is driven by large-scale grain farming, dairy and horticultural farming. The town is also a local manufacturing hub with a number of nationally recognised manufacturing concerns, including Raiplywoods, Rupa Textiles, Kenya Pipeline Company, Kenya Co-operative Creameries as well as corn, wheat and pyrethrum factories all within the town.

The city is home to a large market and is known for the Doinyo Lessos cheese factory, Moi University and Eldoret International Airport. The runners from Eldoret have also contributed significantly to the economy of Eldoret town, primarily investing in small businesses and real estate, from their winnings in races all over the world. Moses Kiptanui is a stake holder in one of the largest buildings, Komora, that houses a large supermarket chain and many offices.

=== Industries ===
==== Textiles ====
The city has an industry that is led by Ken Knit (Kenya). It is the first, fully integrated textile manufacturing company in East and Central Africa and has been based in Eldoret for close to 50 years. It is Kenya's leading manufacturer of wool products and with a workforce of 2,000, is presently the largest textile related employer in the North-Rift.

Another notable textile firm is Rivatex EA which was opened in 1975 by then Vice President, Daniel Toroitich arap Moi as Rift Valley Textiles (Rivatex), a parastatal that was the first Kenyan textile mill to operate computerized mills. It quickly became a success, achieving profitability within three years while employing 400 people and consuming 3,000 tons of cotton a year at its peak. By the late 1990s, the liberalization of Kenya's market which led to massive imports of cheap used clothing coupled with mismanagement led to the decline of the country's textile industry. Rivatex in Eldoret was placed under receivership in 1998 and finally shut its doors in 2000.

The city of Eldoret, through Moi University and its subsidiary firm Rivatex, has played a leading role in the revival of the Kenyan textile industry.

The defunct Rivatex was purchased from the Government of Kenya in 2007 by Moi University as a facility for research, product development, extension and production. The university identified the high cost of imported dyes as a factor affecting profitability. This was resolved in 2008, when Prof Richard Mibey, invented the Tami Dye, a natural dye made from Mexican Marigold which was previously considered a weed in the surrounding regions. The university holds the patent to this dye.

Being able to produce affordable dye in Kenya has been a key contributing factor to the revival of Rivatex East Africa and the wider Kenyan textile industry. The university won a $60 million grant from the World Bank to carry out a face-lift as a result of the work on the Tami Dye. It also secured a pledged investment of $40 million from the Indian Government.

==== Digital assembly ====
In mid-2019, Rivatex reopened following major renovations and restructuring. As part of this effort, it opened a Digital Assembly Plant with the capacity to produce laptops, tablets, electric meters, smartphones and other digital devices.

==== Military ====
The city is host to the Moi Barracks for the Kenya Defence Forces. The barracks has a memorial for Kenyan soldiers killed in battle in Somalia. The city is also home to the Kenya Ordnance Factories Corporation since 1997, a military installation that was the first manufacturer of small arms and ammunition in the region. Its customers include the Kenya Police, Wildlife Service, the Army, licensed dealers and carriers as well as friendly governments.

==== Fertilizer ====
The Toyota Tsusho Corporation built Kenya's first full scale fertilizer blending factory at Ngeria on the outskirts of Eldoret. The $15 million plant has the capacity to produce 150,000 tonnes per year which is 25% of Kenya's 600,000 annual requirement.

=== Services ===
==== Data and cellular networks ====
In early 2019, Safaricom, Kenya's largest mobile network operator, set up its second largest call centre, and its first outside Nairobi, in Eldoret town. The Kshs 900 million facility provides employment to 800 individuals of whom 300 are paid interns from local universities.

The town is also home to the MGW site, located at Kapsoya, the first of Safaricom's data centre in the North Rift, set up in 2015.

==== Tourism ====
Eldoret has traditionally not been known as a tourist destination and does not have much to differentiate it from Kenya's other highland centres. Being Kenya's fifth-largest town however, it is a great deal bigger and serves as a base for touring the North-Rift circuit. The town has a decent variety of accommodation options, notably the Sirikwa Hotel, Poa Place, The Noble Hotel and Conference Centre and the ultra-modern Boma Inn as well as enough night-life options to interest one for an evening or two.

==== Surrounding region ====
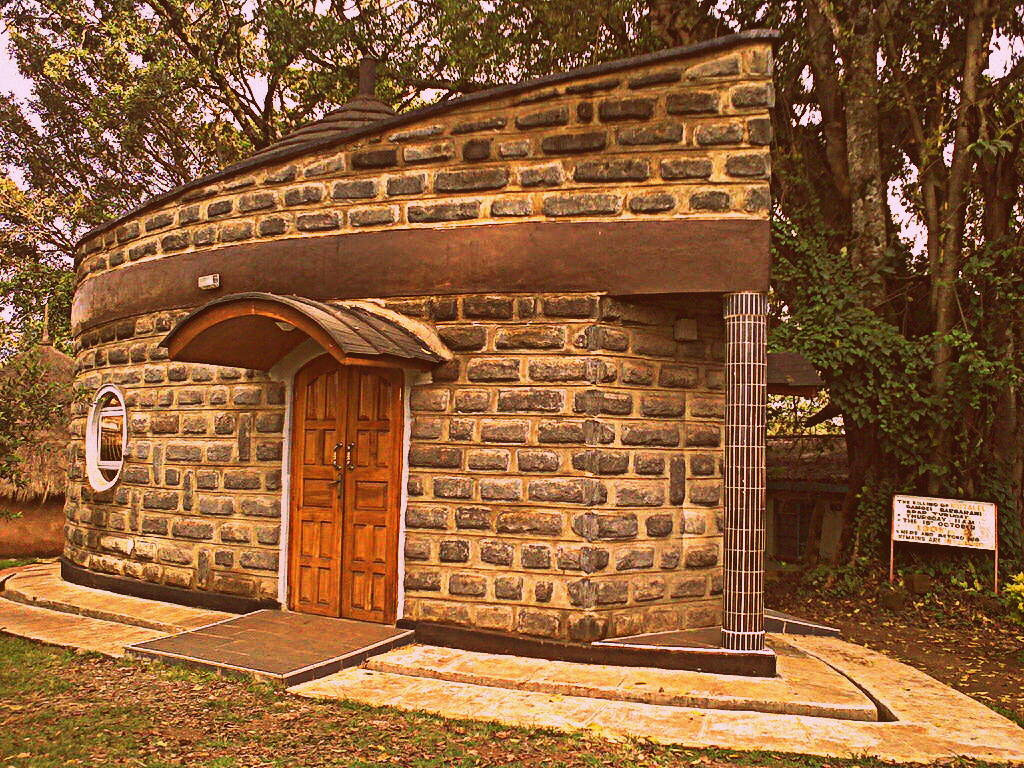
Koitalel Arap Samoei Mausoleum and Museum in Nandi Hills; a historic monument located close to Eldoret

The town and its surrounding regions has also lately grown into a sports tourism destination thanks to a number of residents, renowned world runners and a high-altitude that makes the local area suitable for athletics training.

Notable attractions within easy distance of Eldoret include the Nandi Hills area to the south, home of the Nandi, the fiercest early opponents to British rule. It is also the home of the Chemosit, a crypto-beast that is said to devour human brains.

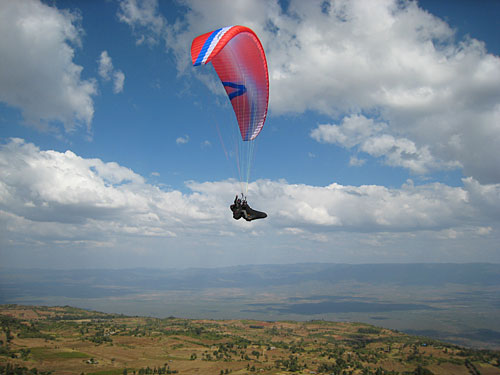
Paraglading in Elgeyo Marakwet

To the north lies the town of Iten, capital of Elgeyo Marakwet county and the world's foremost source of elite-middle and long-distance runners. It is a popular destination for foreigners looking to hone their athletics talent and time at its high altitude training centres form part of a number of elite athletes training regimens. Notably, altitude training here was a key element of Mo Farah's preparations before his 5000m and 10000m gold medals at London 2012 and World Championships 2013.

Elgeyo Marakwet is also increasingly gaining a global reputation as a paragliding destination. It has become the place to go to fly 100–200 km (62–124 mi) out-and-returns in January with world records across both distances having been set in the Kerio Valley in 2013 and 2014 respectively.

== Points of interest ==
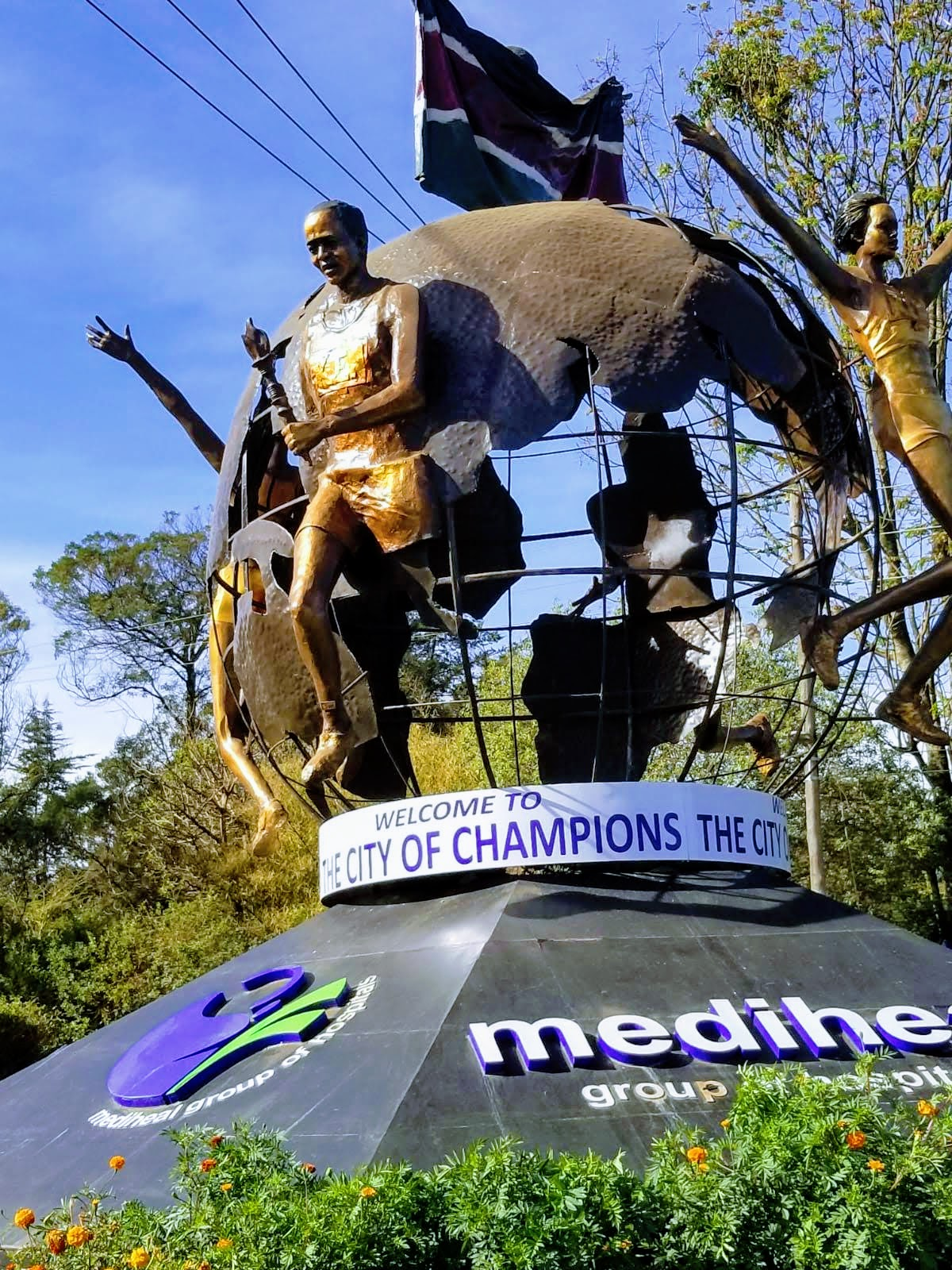
Champions Monument located in Eldoret, Kenya

Located at the intersection of Kaptagat and Nairobi roads, the Champions Monument is a statue honoring Kenyan athletes. The bronze monument, erected by Mediheal Group of Hospitals and Athletics Kenya, depicts four athletes around a globe, two male and two female, all running in different directions. One male runner carries an Olympic torch, while the others have their arms raised in a V sign for victory. A fifth athlete stands atop the globe draped in the Kenyan flag.

Located in Nandi County, some 25 kilometres (16 mi) away from Eldoret at a point where the River Sosiani plunges 100 metres (330 ft) from the plateau and over a granite escarpment, are the Chepkiit Waterfalls. The name loosely translates to "view from above" and it features four viewpoints which are favorite locations for picnics and bird-seeing excursions. In the past, the location was a site of the ancient practice of Sheu Morobi where very old members of the Nandi community would jump to their deaths for a variety of reasons including loneliness and so as not to burden the community.

The Eldoret Arboretum is located next to the Kipchoge Keino stadium and is jointly managed by the County Government of Uasin Gishu and the Kenya Forest Service (KFS). The arboretum hosts a Wall of Fame that features the names of legendary and elite Kenyan athletes, most of whom come from the surrounding regions. The Wall of Fame is styled as four pillars each holding the names scripted across four categories; Olympians, World Champions, World Cross Country champions and marathon greats.

Situated north-east of Eldoret at the high altitude of 2,400 m above sea level, the small town of Iten is known for its regional honey, being home to training camps for international athletes and the viewpoints of the Great Rift Valley. The Iten Viewpoint offers views of natural landmarks such as Kerio valley, Lake Kamnarok, Kerio River with its crocodiles, Tugen Hills and Cherangani Hills. Iten viewpoint allows visitors to see more of the Great Rift Valley than any other place in Africa.

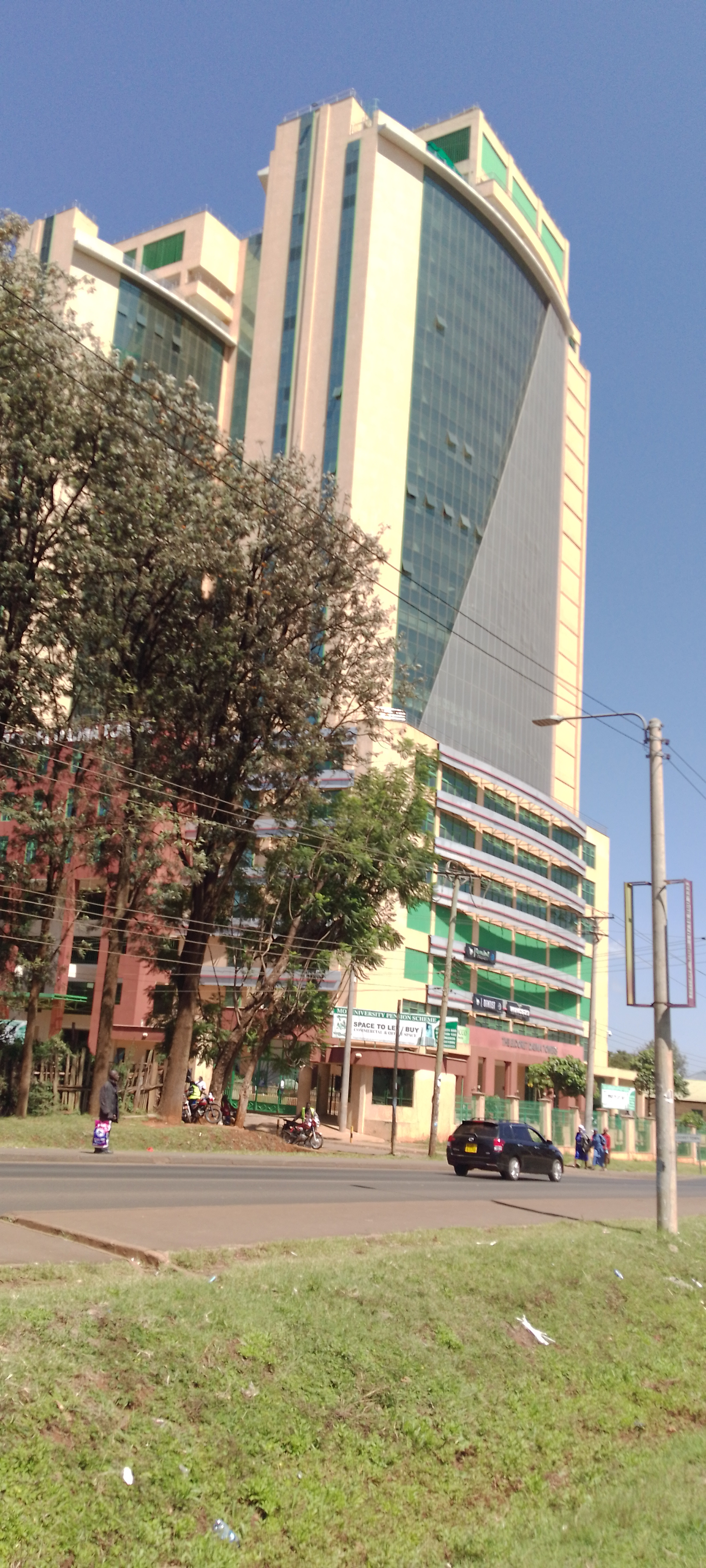
Daima Towers Eldoret

At 26 floors and 70 metres (230 ft) tall, Daima Towers is the tallest building in Kenya west of Nairobi and stands a landmark of the town. It was built by the Moi University Pension Scheme and was opened in 2016. The building features a rooftop restaurant as well as a variety of boutiques and office spaces.

Athletics is by far the most popular sport in the region, with wins at the Olympics and World Athletics Championships as well as road races across the world having propelled many local residents to stardom and financial success. As such, athletics training centers can function as tourist attractions. Current and future athletes can be seen training at the IAAF High Altitude Training Center and other privately run training centers, the Kipchoge Keino stadium or even along the streets on most mornings.

== Education ==
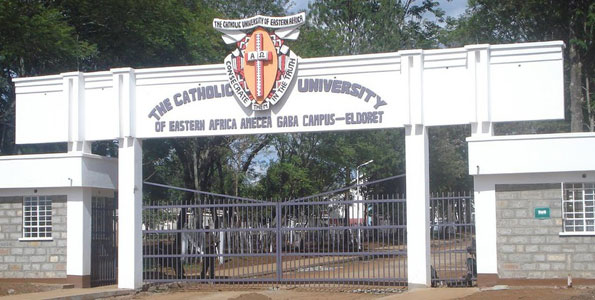
Catholic University of East Africa

Eldoret is home to Moi University. Though the university's main campus is about 30 kilometres (19 mi) away in Kesess, located due south, four of its campuses are within the town limits of Eldoret. These campuses are: Annex Campus (School of Law), Town Campus (School of Medicine and School of dental sciences), Rivatex Campus (School of aeronautical engineering) and Eldoret West campus (for privately sponsored students). As of 2006, it had a student population of 14,855.

The University of Eldoret is the second largest university in the city having been awarded its charter in 2013. Its main campus is located within the city limits to the north of the town.

Other universities with campuses in the town include Catholic University of East Africa, Jomo Kenyatta University, University of Nairobi, University of East Africa - Baraton, Kabarak University, Mount Kenya University and Kisii University

The city also is home to many technical and vocational institutes including Rift Valley Technical Training Institute, Eldoret National Polytechnic, African Institute for Research and Applied Studies.

== Health ==
There are a number of medical facilities in the city, notably Moi Teaching and Referral Hospital, the second largest national referral hospital in Kenya. In 2025, the hospital has seen staffing shortages due to a doctors' strike in February, emigration by nurses working in hospitals abroad, and major cuts to US-funded programs such as AMPATH that put all related staff on unpaid leave.

In 2015, East & Central Africa's first public children's hospital, the Shoe4Africa Children's Hospital, a 200-bed general teaching hospital, was opened, an extension of the Moi Referral. Also in 2015, a new outpatient cancer treatment centre was opened at the Moi Teaching and Referral Hospital, funded principally by Ruth Lily, an American philanthropist. It has been named after the businessman, Manu Chandaria, a later funder, and is now known as The Chandaria Cancer and Chronic Disease Centre.

The city also hosts the Uasin Gishu District Hospital, and there are several private institutions: St. Luke Orthopaedic And Trauma Hospital, Eldoret Hospital, Mediheal Hospital, Eldoret Oncology Associates Cancer Hospital, Reale Hospital, Alexandria Cancer Centre and Palliative Care Hospital and Elgon View Hospital among others.

== Sports ==
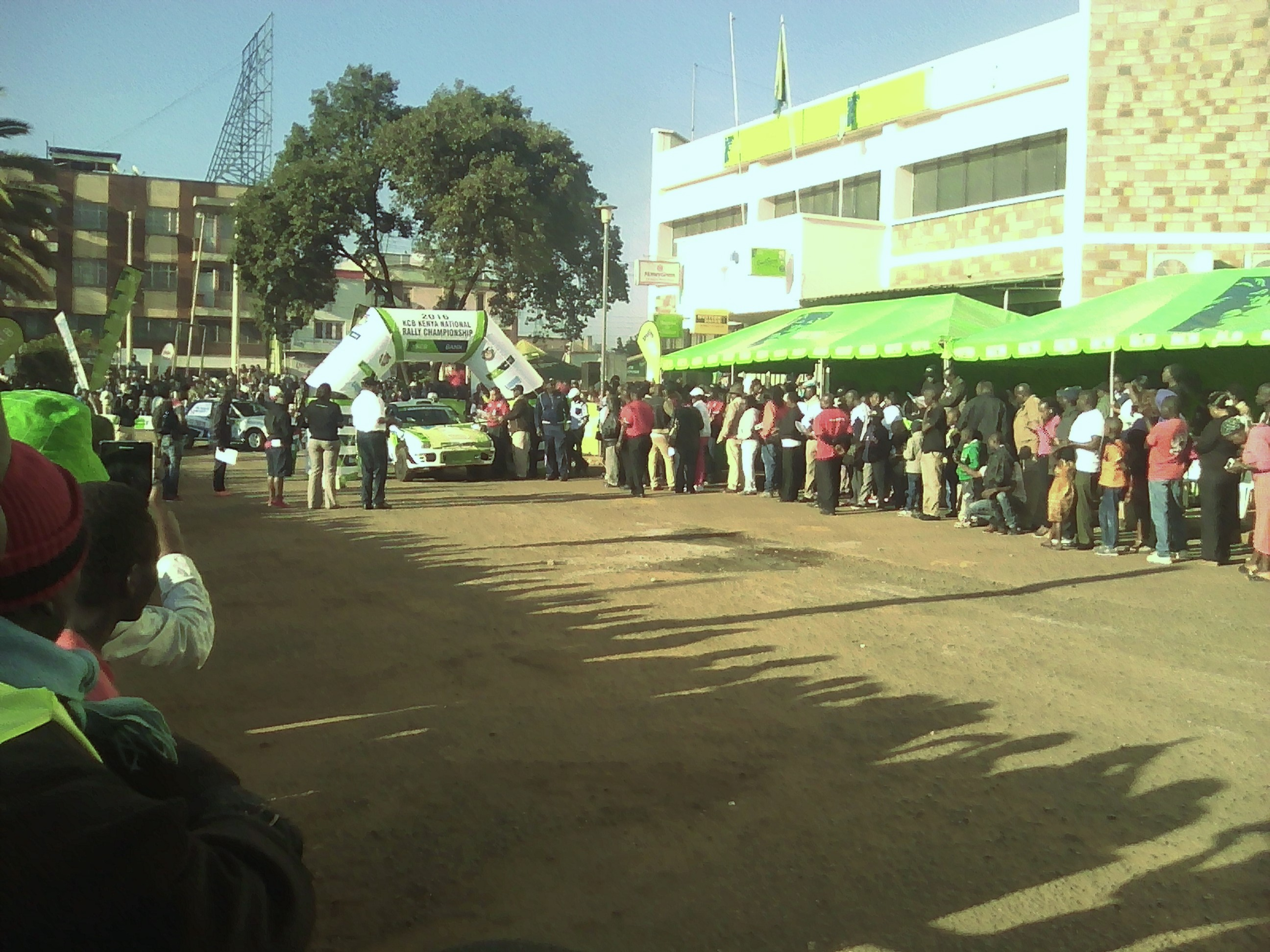
KCB Safari rally

Eldoret and its suburb Elgon View are known as the hometown and training ground of numerous Kenyan distance runners. The high altitude is an ideal training ground for many middle and long-distance athletes, and the area hosts training centers, including at the University of Eldoret and the International Association of Athletics Federations (IAAF)'s High Altitude Training Centre for Kenyan and international athletes, 32 kilometres (20 mi) from city limits in Iten.

Kipchoge Keino Stadium is the town's main stadium and is a multi-use stadium with a capacity of 10,000 people. The stadium is used for athletic meetings and hosts local football teams including Rivatex and Eldoret KCC. The stadium fell into disrepair and was refurbished beginning in 2007 when the Kenyan Government allocated Ksh100 million for its upgrade. In 2018, it began going through a second major expansion and renovation.

Eldoret Falcons is a women's football team that represents the city in the nationwide league while Eldoret RFC is a men's rugby team in the nationwide league. The city has also been a popular stage in the KCB Safari Rally. The city has also hosted a popular leg of the annual Kenya National Sevens Circuit rugby tournament. The Eldoret leg is played in June and referred to as the Sepetuka Sevens.

The town is home to the Eldoret City Marathon, whose $35,000 winners purse made it the richest marathon race in Africa during its second edition in 2019. The event is organised by the Uasin Gishu county government and is patronized by the County Governor, H.E Jonathan Kimeli Bii Chelilim and John Kibet Barorot.

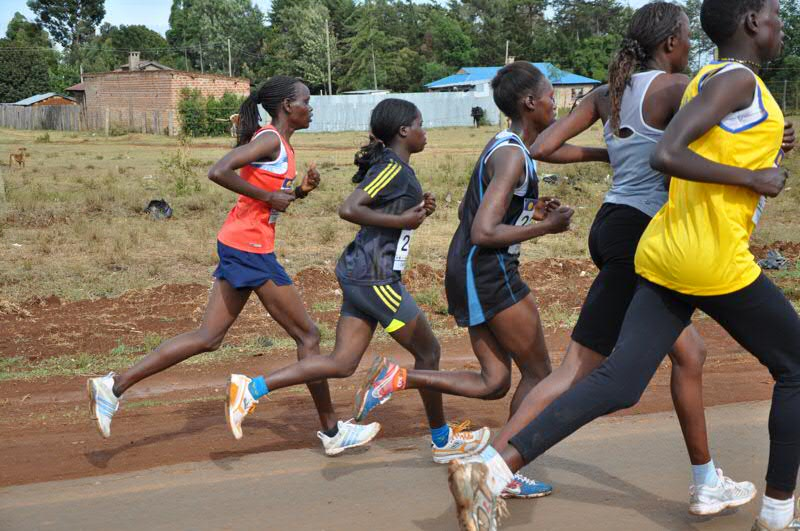
Athletes Participate in Kass Marathon

Eldoret was the venue of the 2024 African Road Championships, an annual road cycling tournament.

== Infrastructure ==
=== Transport ===
==== Airports ====
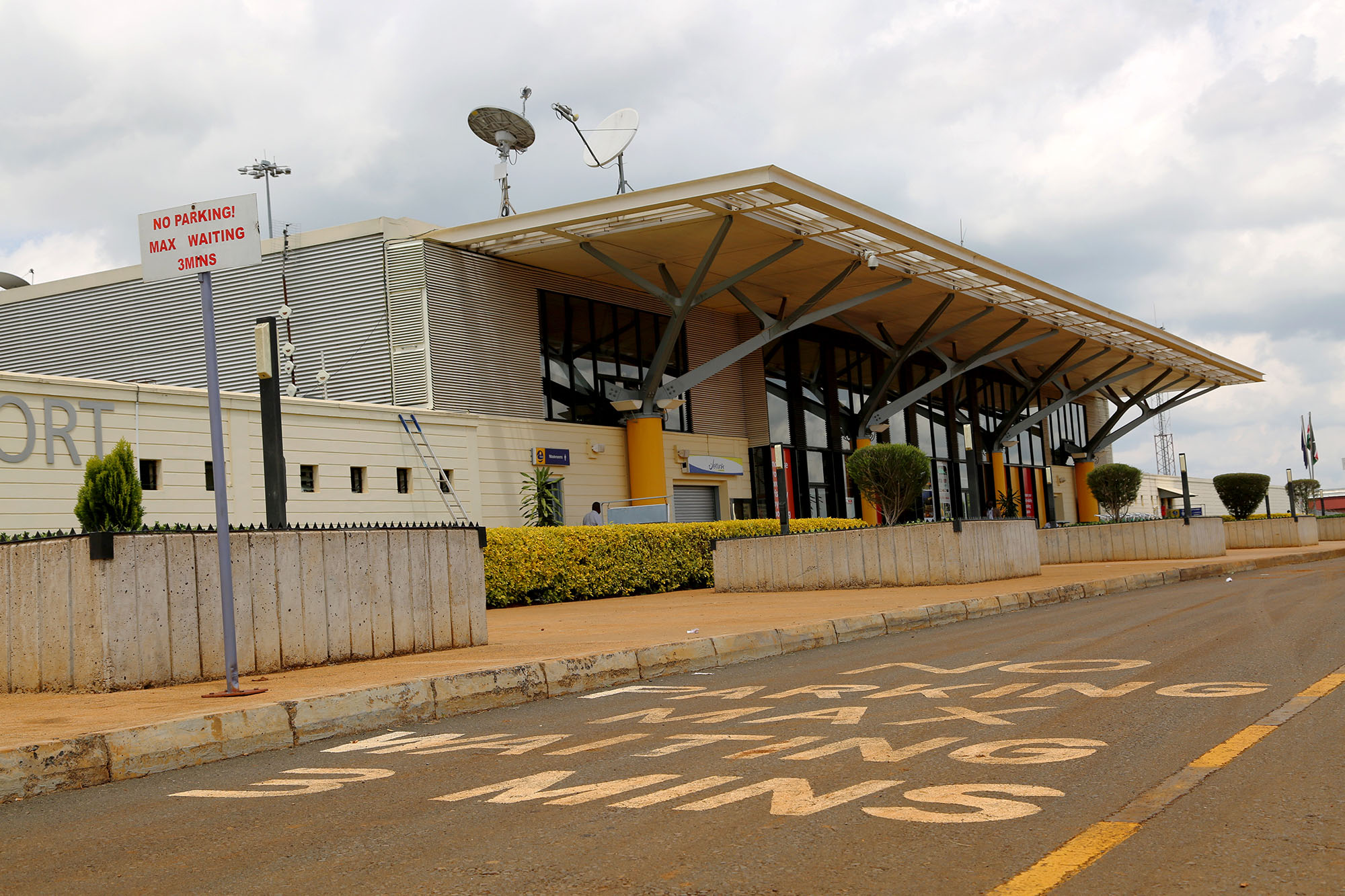
Entry to the main lounge of Eldoret International Airport

The town of Eldoret is served by two aerodromes, Eldoret International Airport and Eldoret Airstrip. Eldoret International Airport is a regional airport approximately 14 km (8.7 mi) from Eldoret city. It has daily scheduled flights to Nairobi and Lodwar and weekly international cargo flights operated by Emirates and Etihad Airways. Situated at 6,941 feet (2,116 m) above sea level, the airport has a single asphalt runway that measures 3,475 metres (11,401 ft) in length.

Four domestic airline companies operate in this airport: Fly 540, Jambojet, Skyward Express and Silverstone Air.

The Eldoret Airstrip, also known as the Eldoret Boma Airport, is a small airstrip located within Eldoret on the Eldoret Iten road. It has an elevation of 7,050 ft above sea level and a single runway measuring 1,130 metres (3,710 ft). The county government of Uasin Gishu took over operations of the Eldoret airstrip in July 2015.

==== Roads ====
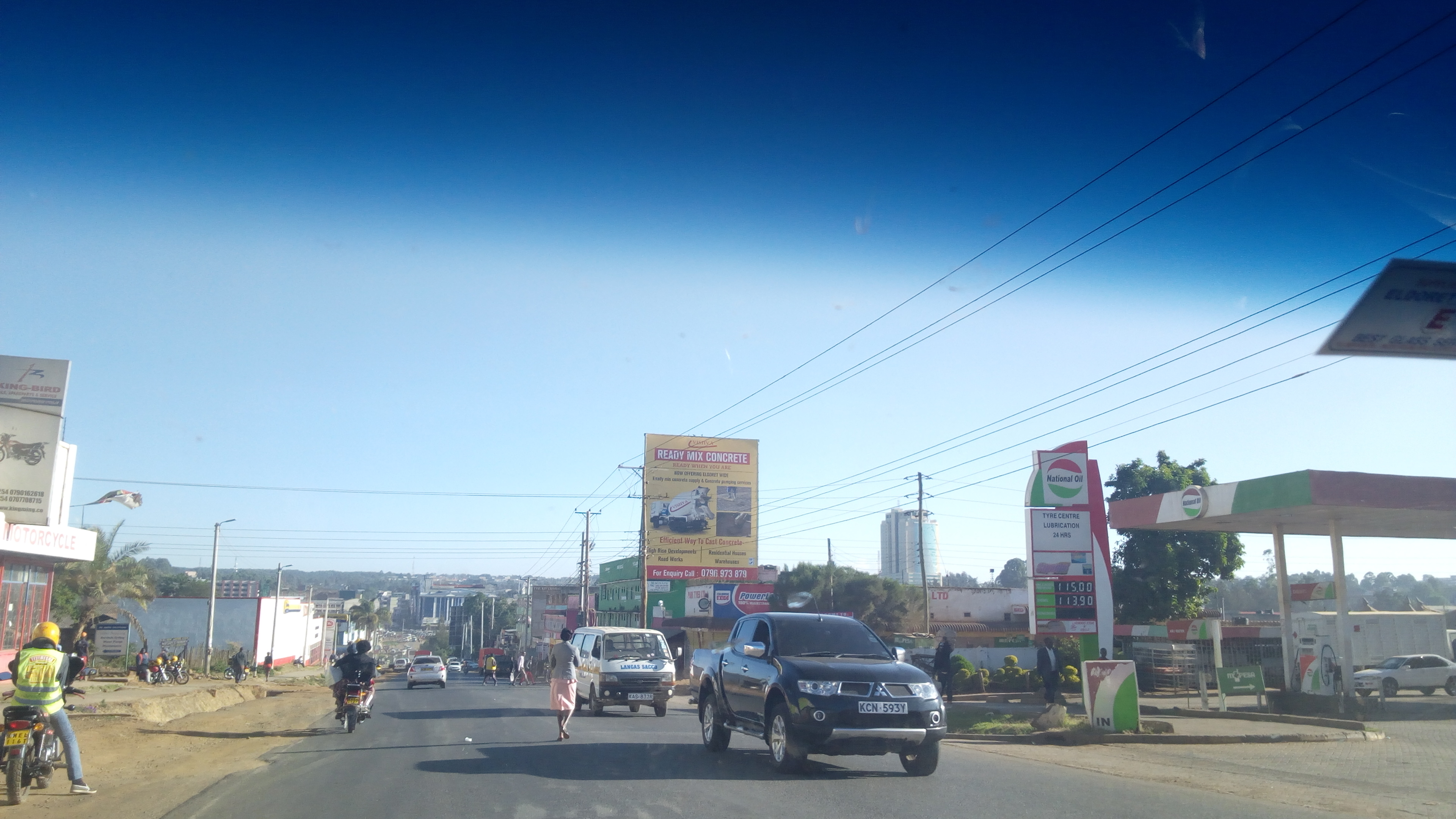
Vehicles leaving Eldoret, near Sosiani primary school.

The Trans-African highway passes through the town's central business district.

==== Railway ====
The town is also served by the Kenya-Uganda railway. Construction began in 1920, reaching Eldoret in 1924 and winding up at Kampala in 1930. This extension put Eldoret town itself 64 miles away from the railhead, an occurrence that birthed the town's famous moniker of Farm 64 which morphed into Sisibo through vernacular influence. Construction of the Eldoret line paved the way for the extension of other branch lines into areas of high European settlement such as Kitale, Nyahururu, and Nanyuki. Railway presence in these towns created a reliable means of transporting farm produce, thus leading to their growth and development as the colony's bread baskets.

=== Power ===
The French renewable energy firm Voltalia is building a 40-megawatt (MW) solar plant for compatriot Kenya-based French solar firm Alten Africa in Kesses, Eldoret. Once it goes into commercial operation, scheduled for March 2020, approximately 123.6GWh of clean electricity will be injected into the grid every year, enough to meet the annual energy consumption needs of over 824,000 Kenyans.

==== Oil pipelines ====
The Kenya Pipeline Company operates a pipeline that passes through the town. It is connected to a refinery at the coastal city of Mombasa and extends further from Eldoret to the lakeside city of Kisumu. One of 5 national oil depots is located in the town.

== Notable people ==
- Mohammed Hussein Ali, military commander
- Shadrack Kiptoo Biwott, American distance runner
- Philip Boit, cross-country skier, the first Kenyan to participate in the Winter Olympics
- Serena de la Hey, sculptor
- Kipchoge Keino, runner and former Kenyan Olympic Committee chair
- Eliud Kipchoge, marathon runner and former world-record holder

== Sister cities ==
Eldoret is a sister town to the cities of:

Country	City	County/District/Province/Region/State	Date
Germany	Bad Vilbel	Hessen	1982
USA	Minneapolis	Minnesota	2000
USA	Indianapolis	Indiana	2007
USA	Ithaca	New York	2007
