= David Lelei =

Kenyan middle-distance runner

Personal information
- Born: 10 May 1971 Kenya
- Died: 17 February 2010 (aged 38) Kenya
- Height: 1.76 m (5 ft 9 in)

Sport
- Country: Kenya
- Sport: Running
- Event: 800 metres 1500 metres
- Club: Kenyan running team
- Retired: 2004

Achievements and titles
- Personal best: 1:43.97; 3:31.53
Medal record
Men's athletics
All-Africa Games
Silver medal – second place	1999 Johannesburg	1500 m

David Lelei (10 May 1971 – 17 February 2010) was a Kenyan middle distance runner. who specialized in the 800 and 1500 metres. He was later an athletics official and a political candidate, but died in a vehicle accident in 2010.

== Career ==
In 1999, Lelei finished seventh in the 1500 metres at the World Championships in Seville, won the silver medal in the same distance at the All-Africa Games in Johannesburg, and finished fifth at the IAAF Grand Prix Final. At the All-Africa Games it was the first time since 1987 without a Kenyan victory in the event. Lelei later finished fourth at the 2001 World Indoor Championships in Lisbon.

In the most regular events he had personal bests of 1:43.97 minutes in the 800 metres, achieved in March 2000 in Melbourne; and 3:31.53 minutes in the 1500 metres, achieved in July 1998 in Stuttgart. He also had 2:16.43 minutes in the 1000 metres, achieved in June 2003 in Palo Alto; 3:53.14 minutes in the mile run, achieved in July 1999 in Rome; and 5:01.43 minutes in the 2000 metres, achieved in June 1998 in Prague.

== Later life ==
After his running career, he was the chairman of the Wareng district branch of Athletics Kenya. He vied for National Assembly of Kenya candidacy in 2007, but lost at the Orange Democratic Movement's primaries to Peris Chepchumba, who eventually won the Eldoret South Constituency seat at the 2007 elections.

=== Death ===
On 17 February 2010, David Lelei died in a vehicle accident while travelling with fellow runner and friend Moses Tanui along the Nairobi-Nakuru highway (A104 road), about 200 kilometres (120 mi) from the Kenyan capital Nairobi. Tanui sustained serious injuries to his chest and legs, and was rushed to the nearby St Mary's hospital, before being transferred to Nairobi hospital for specialist treatment. Doctors have described his condition as "out of danger".
