= Hyrax Hill =

- Hyrax Hill Site
- 0°16′56″N 36°6′14″E
- Location: Kenya

Hyrax Hill is a prehistoric site near Nakuru in the Rift Valley province of Kenya. It is a rocky spur roughly half a kilometer in length, with an elevation of 1,900 meters above sea level at its summit. The site was first discovered in 1926 by Louis Leakey during excavations at the nearby Nakuru Burial Site, and Mary Leakey conducted the first major excavations between 1937 and 1938. There are two distinct areas of occupation at Hyrax Hill: one which was occupied during the Pastoral Neolithic and late Iron Age, and one which was occupied by the Sirikwa earlier in the Iron Age.

Hyrax Hill is named after the hyrax, a small mammal that lives in rocky areas. Hyraxes were once common in the rocky crevasses of Hyrax Hill, but their numbers have dropped in recent years due to the rapid urbanization of the surrounding area.

Hyrax Hill is the location of Hyrax Hill Prehistoric Site and Museum.

== History of excavation ==
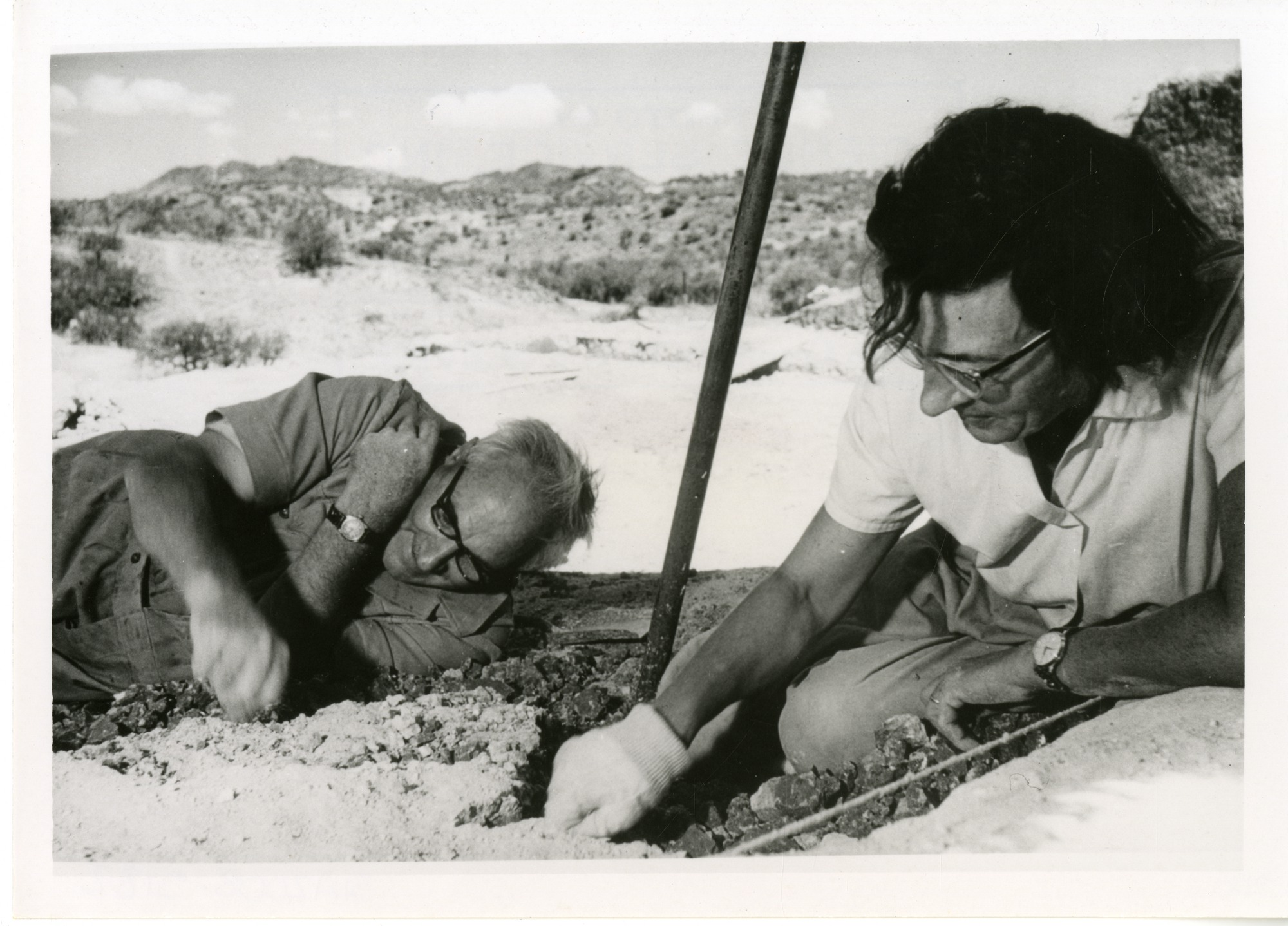
Mary and Louis Leakey excavating at Olduvai Gorge, Tanzania

Louis Leakey discovered the remains of prehistoric settlements at Hyrax Hill while excavating the nearby Nakuru Burial in 1926. He did not excavate it at the time because he believed it to be a recent occupation, and was busy working at several other sites. Louis Leakey returned to the area in 1937 with his wife, Mary Leakey. It was Mary Leakey who began major excavations at Hyrax Hill. She excavated and named both Site I and Site II between 1937 and 1938. With no carbon dating technology available, dating the sites was difficult at the time. Leakey mistakenly described the Iron Age "Sirikwa Holes" as a pre-Iron Age village with "pit-dwellings." Excavations at the site were not undertaken again until after Hyrax Hill was obtained by the National Museums of Kenya in 1965, at which time one of the Sirikwa holes was fully excavated by Ron Clark and museum staff for display at the museum.

== Location and environment ==
Hyrax Hill is located near Lake Nakuru. 5000 to 6000 years ago, during the occupation of Site I, a wetter climate meant that lake levels were as much as 100 meters higher than their present levels. Hyrax Hill was a peninsula at this time, which jutted out into the north side of the lake. The occupants would have had access to a steady supply of fresh water, as well as fish. Mary Leakey identified the ancient rocky beach of the lake in her 1938 excavations. The early occupation of Site I lies directly on the ancient beach, and she was able to use this and relative dating to date this portion of the site.

Lake levels began to drop starting 3500 years ago, and the area became a more open savanna grassland. The drier environment was well suited to the pastoralism used by the later Sirikwan inhabitants of Site II.

== Archaeology ==
=== Site I ===
"Site I" is the area of Hyrax Hill that was occupied during the Neolithic and late Iron Age. Although the early occupation of the site 5000 years ago is frequently referred to as the "Neolithic" (a trend started by Louis and Mary Leakey during the first excavations in the area), evidence has yet to be found for the cultivation of crops or raising of animals at the early occupation of Site I at Hyrax Hill. The Iron Age portion of the site dates to around 200 years ago, and consists of several stone enclosures and a large midden. Directly under this layer was an earlier Neolithic cemetery. The Neolithic cemetery consisted of several low burial mounds formed out of large blocks of stone. Many of the individuals buried at the site were dismembered.

The occupants of this period of the site manufactured distinctive ground stone bowls, and many were found associated with female burials in the Neolithic cemetery at Hyrax Hill and other sites in the area. The bowls from Hyrax Hill are round or oblong, particularly shallow, and made from an easily accessed local variety of stone. Because these bowls were so distinctive at many sites in the Rift Valley, archaeologists created the term "Stone Bowl Culture" to encompass the Neolithic culture they were believed to represent. The term "Stone Bowl Culture" is not widely used today, having been supplanted by "Savanna Pastoral Neolithic", a culture which Christopher Ehret indicates was likely produced by early Cushitic settlers. In Kenya, the broader term "Pastoral Neolithic" refers to sites archaeological containing a Later Stone Age lithic industry, predominant livestock husbandry, and ceramic vessels.

The ceramic type known as "Nderit ware" is found at Site I. These are rounded vessels with a highly textured surface of wedge-shaped impressions, which are commonly found at Neolithic sites in eastern Africa. They resemble baskets.

=== Site II ===
"Site II" lies on the north-western side of Hyrax hill, opposite from Site I. It was occupied earlier in the Iron Age than Site I. Radiocarbon dates have found that Site II was occupied between the twelfth and fifteenth centuries AD. Site II was occupied by the Sirikwa, a later group of cattle pastoralists. The main feature of this site is a series of thirteen sandy bowl-shaped depressions and mounds. These depressions, called Sirikwa Holes, were deliberately constructed as pens for securing cattle, and the low mounds that are adjacent to these hollows were created from heaping dung and refuse outside the pen. The remains of cattle, goats, and sheep have been found at Site II, many of which show cut-marks and signs of human use. John Sutton's excavations in 1985 found the mandible of an equine species, possibly a donkey. Excavations in 1990 identified the cattle as likely belonging to the Zebu species. Further analysis showed that female cows were only slaughtered until after lactating age, indicating an emphasis on milk production. This excavation also found the remains of a domesticated dog, the first ever found at a Sirikwa site. Scavenging domesticated dogs possibly account for the carnivore gnaw-marks that have been found on bones at the site.

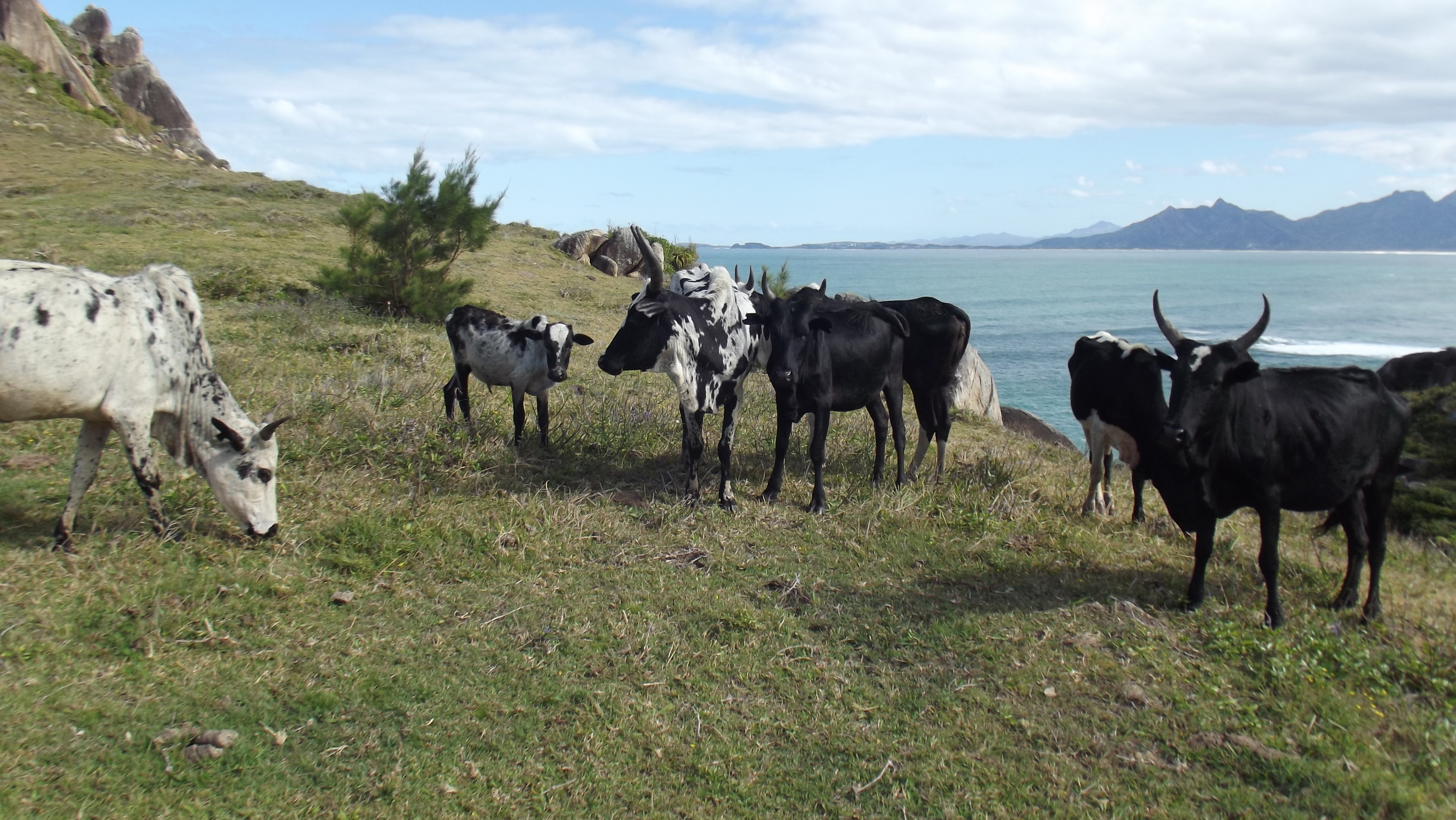
Zebu cattle similar to those that would have been raised by the Sirikwa.

Site II was mistakenly identified as a late Neolithic site when it was first excavated, and Mary Leakey assigned it to the Neolithic "Gumban B" culture which Louis Leakey had identified from earlier excavations in the area. Few Iron-Age sites had been excavated in the area, and there was no reliable way for Mary Leakey to date the site. Few iron artifacts have ever been found at Site II, which further confused the actual date. Scattered obsidian flakes similar to those used by earlier cultures were also found at the site. It is unknown whether these were made by the inhabitants of Site II, or the earlier inhabitants of Site I.

The pottery found at Site II is "Lanet ware" dated to the Iron Age. It consists of tall beakers with simple rims, rounded bottoms, and decoration made from cord impressions. These occasionally have small spouts and rounded handles. The pottery has a distinctive "sand paper" finish, and some vessels have been found with red slips.

=== Other archaeological areas ===
Archaeological remains have been found on the hill outside of Sites I and II. At the top of the hill is a cleared area, possibly created by the later inhabitants of Site I or the inhabitants of Site II. Mary Leakey described it as possibly being a stone circle or fort.

Two bao boards are carved into rock outcroppings at the north side of the hill. One is only partially preserved, but both appear to be a two-row version of the game rather than a four-row version. They are thought to be associated with the Site II Sirikwa habitation.

== Gumban nomenclature ==
While investigating archaeological sites in Kenya, Louis Leakey identified early sites belonging to the Neolithic period. He named these "Gumban" sites, after small forest-dwellers in Kikuyu mythology that were said to have lived in the area before the Kikuyu. He further broke the category down into the "Gumban A" and "Gumban B" variations. Leakey did not intend to imply that the Gumba were the creators of the Neolithic sites, but intended the term to broadly refer to a culture that predated the modern inhabitants of the area. Leakey used this term while excavating the nearby Nakuru burial site, and Mary Leakey continued the usage when excavating Hyrax Hill. The name has since fallen out of use, due to its misleading nature. "Gumban B" was originally identified as a Neolithic culture, but it was often mistakenly used to refer to sites that are now correctly dated to the Iron-Age. There was no reliable way to date the sites at the time, and Louis Leakey accidentally included Iron-Age pottery sherds among the "Gumban B" artifacts of the pre-Iron-Age Nakuru Burial site. Thus, Iron-Age sites like Site II of Hyrax hill became associated with Neolithic "Gumban B" sites until a clearer chronology of the area was developed.

The pottery types found at Hyrax Hill were originally named "Gumban A" and "Gumban B" by Louis and Mary Leakey when they were first discovered at Hyrax Hill and the Nakuru Burial Site. These terms fell out of use along with the term "Gumban". The ceramic type formerly known as "Gumban A" is now known as "Nderit ware" and the type formerly known as "Gumban B" is now known as "Lanet ware." Both these names refer to the locations that the ceramic types were first identified.

== See also ==
- Hyrax Hill Prehistoric Site and Museum
- Savanna Pastoral Neolithic
- Sirikwa people
