= Kenya Ordnance Factories Corporation =

Kenyan defense corporation

- Type: State-owned enterprise
- Industry: Defence
- Founded: July 23, 1997; 29 years ago
- Headquarters: Eldoret, Uasin Gishu County, Kenya
- Area served: Africa
- Products: Ammunitions; Small arms
- Owner: Kenya Ministry of Defence
- Divisions: Ammunition Production Division; General Engineering Division
- Website: www.kofc.co.ke

Kenya Ordnance Factories Corporation (KOFC) is a state-owned defense corporation which is headquartered in Eldoret–Kitale Road 20 km from Eldoret, Kenya.
