= Sirikwa culture =

Pastoral Iron Age Kenyan culture

The Sirikwa culture was the predominant Kenyan hinterland culture of the Pastoral Iron Age, c.2000 BP. Seen to have developed out of the Elmenteitan culture of the East African Pastoral Neolithic c.3300-1200 BP, it was followed in much of its area by the Kalenjin, Maa, western and central Kenyan communities of the 18th and 19th centuries.

The archaeological evidence indicates that from about AD 1200, the Central Rift and Western Highlands of Kenya were relatively densely inhabited by a group (or groups) of people who practiced both cereal cultivation and pastoralism. They made occasional use of metals and created distinctive roulette-decorated pottery. These people are principally known from their characteristic settlement sites, commonly known as 'Sirikwa holes or hollows'. These comprise a shallow depression, sometimes reinforced at the edges by stone revetments, around which habitation structures were built. There are a number of indicators that the central depression was a semi-fortified cattle boma, with people living in connected huts around the exterior.

The evidence suggests that this culture was fully formed in the central Rift Valley at least by 1300 A.D. From here it spread westward to Sotik and Nyanza province, northwards to Cherangani hills and then to Mt. Elgon area and possibly into Uganda. This way of life would decline and eventually disappear by the 18th and 19th centuries.

== Etymology ==
The name Sirikwa derives from the name that various early informants gave to the builders of the structures today known as Sirikwa Holes. The oral literature of the Sengwer people, a community that has been associated with the culture, features a patriarch named Sirikwa whose descendants occupied the Uasin Gishu pateau.

Sengwer had two sons named Sirikwa (elder) and Mitia. Sirikwa occupied the plains (Soi) of what is now part of Trans Nzoia, Lugari and Uasin Gishu districts. Sirikwa had his first son named Chepkoilel. The plains have since been referred to as Kapchepkoilel. The children of Sirikwa and Mitia form the sub-tribes of Sengwer...

Other Nilotic and Bantu peoples that today inhabit the eastern Great Lakes region have other names for the Sirikwa and Sirikwa-like communities. The Dorobo refer to them as the Mokwan, the Meru as the Mwoko, the Kikuyu as the Enjoe, and the Maasai as the Eboratta.

== Periodization ==
Radiocarbon dating of artifacts from Sirikwa sites indicates traces of a Proto-Sirikwa culture dating from c. 700 AD to c. 1200 AD and a Sirikwa Culture proper from c. 1200 AD to c. 1800 AD.

== Range ==
Sirikwa-inhabited territory is believed to have extended from Lake Turkana in the northern part of the Great Lakes region to Lake Eyasi in the south. Its cross-section stretched from the eastern escarpment of the Great Rift Valley to the foot of Mount Elgon. Some of the localities include Cherengany, Kapcherop, Sabwani, Sirende, Wehoya, Moi's Bridge, Hyrax Hill, Lanet, Deloraine (Rongai), Tambach, Moiben, Soy, Turbo, Ainabkoi, Timboroa, Kabyoyon, Namgoi and Chemangel (Sotik).

== Archaeology ==
The archaeological evidence indicates that from about AD 1200, the Central Rift Valley and Western Highlands of Kenya were relatively densely inhabited by a group (or groups) of people who practiced both cereal cultivation and pastoralism. They made occasional use of metals and created distinctive roulette-decorated pottery. These people are however principally known from their characteristic settlement sites, known as 'Sirikwa holes or hollows'.

Numerous saucer-shaped hollows have been found in various areas on the hillsides of the western highlands of Kenya and in the elevated stretch of the central Rift Valley around Nakuru. These hollows, having a diameter of 10–20 metres and an average depth of 2.4 metres, are usually found in groups sometimes numbering less than ten and at times more than a hundred. Excavations at several examples of these sites in the western highlands and in the Nakuru area have shown that they were deliberately constructed to house livestock.

These hollows were surrounded by a fence or stockade and on the downhill side, a single gate, usually with extra works and flanking guard houses. In rocky terrain, notably the Uasin Gishu Plateau and the Elgeyo border, stone walling substituted for fencing or provided a base for the same. At the time of the first recorded accounts during the late 18th centuries, some of the dry stone walling could still be seen though they were mostly in deteriorated state.

From the remains it is apparent that houses were not built inside the actual Sirikwa holes but were attached however and were constructed on the outer side of the fence, being approached through the stock-pen and entered through a connecting door. These hollows are mostly covered over by grass and bush today.

The Sirikwa practiced pastoralism. They herded goats, sheep, and cattle. There is also evidence that they raised donkeys, as well as domesticated dogs. The Sirikwa focused on milk production, which is shown by the lack of lactating age cows in archaeological assemblages. Large herds of sheep and goats were kept for meat, and made up a large proportion of the Sirikwa diet.

In the Kerio Valley of Kenya, among other neighboring areas, there are vestiges of elaborate irrigation systems.

At one site six coins were found at a depth of between 45 cm and 50 cm (except one) and have been dated to between about 60 and 500 years old. These coins (three of them copper and three of silver) are all of Indian origin and are believed to have come from the Gulf of Kutch. Two of them, a rupee and an anna, had some inscriptions in English while the rest were inscribed with an Indian language.

Cup like holes pecked into the rocks in two rows are found in a number of places around Hyrax hill and were used to play bao. Bao is a game of skill played in diverse places, from the Far East and Arab world to Africa and the Caribbean. There are a number of these "bao boards" around the hill and some are exposed for public view.

== See also ==
- Chemwal people
- Loikop people
- Chok people
- Sengwer people
- Maliri people
- Lumbwa people
- Oropom people
- Yaaku people
