= Eldoret South Constituency =

Kenyan electoral constituency

Eldoret South Constituency was an electoral constituency in Kenya. It was one of three constituencies in the former Uasin Gishu District, now Uasin Gishu County. The constituency was established for the 1966 elections.

== Members of Parliament ==
Elections	MP	Party	Notes
1966	Justin Kaptingei Tuwei	KADU	
1969	Charles Changwony Murgor	KANU	One-party system
1974	Charles Changwony Murgor	KANU	One-party system
1979	Charles Changwony Murgor	KANU	One-party system.
1983	Wilson Kipkemboi Korir	KANU	One-party system.
1988	Joseph Kiptiony arap Misoi	KANU	One-party system.
1992	Joseph Kiptiony arap Misoi	KANU	
1997	Jesse Kibet Maizs	KANU	
2002	David Kiptanui Koros	KANU	
2007	Peris Chepchumba	ODM	
2013	James Bett	URP	

== Wards ==
Wards
Ward	Registered Voters	Local Authority
Cheptiret	4,787	Wareng county
Kipchamo	2,504	Wareng county
Kipkenyo	3,574	Eldoret municipality
Langas	7,370	Eldoret municipality
Megun / Kesses	8,386	Wareng county
Ngeria	4,082	Wareng county
Oleinguse	4,813	Wareng county
Pioneer/Elgon View	4,951	Eldoret municipality
Race course	4,428	Eldoret municipality
Simat / Kapsaret	5,604	Wareng county
Simotwa	3,336	Burnt Forest town
Tarakwa	1,711	Burnt Forest town
Timboroa	3,283	Wareng county
Tulwet / Chuiyat	4,706	Wareng county
Total	63,535	
*September 2005.
