= Sirikwa people =

Kenyan tribe and community

The Sirikwa people were a historically attested community in the western highland regions of present-day Kenya, remembered primarily through oral traditions and early colonial-era ethnography. While their name has since been applied to a broader archaeological horizon—the so-called Sirikwa culture—the Sirikwa themselves seem to have been a clan or sub-tribe within the larger East African Pastoral Iron Age complex, and may not have been the sole bearers of that material tradition.

Oral traditions consistently place the Sirikwa on the Uasin Gishu plateau and adjacent highlands prior to their dispersal in the mid-19th century. Many of these traditions—particularly those preserved by the Pokot and neighboring Kalenjin-speaking groups—emphasize that the plateau was never inhabited by a single people, but was instead shared by at least two distinct communities. This suggests a multi-ethnic or segmented settlement pattern, with the Sirikwa forming just one of several culturally related groups that once inhabited the region.

Their legacy survives both in oral tradition and in the archaeological nomenclature that continues to bear their name.

== Historical Identity ==
Accounts recorded in the early 20th century strongly associate the Sirikwa with a community known as Uasin Gishu Maasai. Huntingford (1910) reports that;

There is no doubt that they are the people called il-Mukwan by the Uasin Gishu Masai (hereinafter referred to as Ipkopek, their Kony name). They appear to have been a section of the Ipkopek, who say that the il-Mukwan were driven out by them and fled to Tanganyika Territory, where their remnant still lives, called Sirikwa (Sirikwek) by the Nandi and the Kony of Elgon.

This 'Kony perspective' is notably corroborated by certain elements recorded in A. C. Hollis’s The Nandi: Their Language and Folklore (1909). He notes that the Nandi use the term "Mokwanisiek" (derived from Mukwan/Mukwanik) to describe the distinctive earthworks—now referred to as Sirikwa holes—which they attribute to an earlier people. Hollis also records that the Nandi refer to the Maasai as "Ipuapcho (pl. Ipuapek)", directly paralleling the Kony’s term Ipkopek.

An earlier account by C. W. Hobley, writing in 1906, offers further support:

"On the ..Uasin Gishu plateau between Mount Elgon and Elgeyo, are the remains of a past race in the form of numerous ruined stone kraals, circular in shape. The Uasin Gishu people who formerly inhabited the plateau declare that they are the relics of a race called Mokwan (possibly the people were called Sirikwa, and the kraals Mokwan) who peopled that region previous to themselves."

The Kony of Mount Elgon (also Kalenjin speakers) recall that the Sirikwa were once part of the Ipkopek, but were later targeted in a ritual alliance between the Ipkopek and Kony chiefs, resulting in the Sirikwa's forced exodus to what is now northern Tanzania (then Tanganyika Territory).

Though eventually assimilated into emerging polities, the Sirikwa retained a distinct identity long enough to be remembered as culturally foundational by successor groups. According to Chief Isaiah Keina of Kapsabet as told to Wilson (1952):

“These people were like the Nandi but not completely Nandi in language and customs, and they suddenly disappeared, leaving only a small group who became completely assimilated.”

Keina and his mother traced their descent to the Sirikwa who remained, highlighting how their legacy persists in both bloodlines and memory.

Wilson’s account of the Tatoga people of Tanzania—linguistically linked to the Kalenjin—appears to support traditions of a southern migration from the Mount Elgon region. He notes that the Tatoga language is of the Nandi type and that they lived around Mount Elgon roughly 250 years ago. While he is uncertain whether they were once Nandi or simply shared a common ancestry with groups like the Nandi, Kipsigis, and Maasai, he favors the idea of a shared origin. A recurring myth among Tatoga sub-tribes describes a homeland on a high mountain—Endabesht—overlooking two great lakes, widely interpreted as Lake Victoria and Lake Turkana. He also remarks on the notability that, a place named Endabess near Mount Elgon is remembered by the Nandi as a former Sirikwa settlement. Adding to this picture, Chief Isaiah Keina of Kapsabet recounts that his own clan was once known as “Sirikwa kap Gabandot”—rendered in Barabaig as gaban dosh’t gaba sirkwa, “I am from the gate of the Sirikwa clan or sub-tribe.” This testimony underscores that the Sirikwa functioned as one identifiable sub-tribe or clan within a broader agropastoral society - what the Tatoga call eimojik.

== Geographic Distribution ==
The oral and ethnographic accounts appear to be consistent in placing the Sirikwa on the Uasin Gishu plateau between Mount Elgon and Elgeyo. All these accounts are also consistent in stating that after their dispersal, surviving Sirikwa groups were pushed into areas south of Nandi and into northern Tanzania.

== Relationship to the Sirikwa Culture ==
The archaeological term Sirikwa culture refers to a widespread Late Iron Age agropastoral tradition (c. AD 1200–1600) found across Kenya’s Rift Valley and western highlands. The greatest occurrence of this culture is in Uasin Gishu and Nandi extending south of Nandi into 'Kipigis country' and to the Tanzania border, this overlays almost exactly the regions occupied by the Kalenjin today.

The archaeological remains are of various categories, and include;

- Enclosures of stone and earth (now called Sirikwa holes)
- Tumuli
- Monoliths
- Roads
- Irrigation canals, and
- Graves

The vast majority of the remains are of the Sirikwa hole type and only one instance of a monolith has been recorded. Huntingford (1910) reported on the feature located on the summit of a hill in the western Nandi escarpment, called Tobolwa by the Nandi. On the northern edge, where the rock falls sheer for some 70 feet, it has been hewn into a sort of semi-circular seat 2 feet high and about 20 feet in length. Inside the semi-circle, and lying on its side, is a roughly shaped block of granite, square in section and 10 feet long but broken into three pieces at the time of his writing. The monolith tapered slightly at one end. In the center of the flat summit is a shallow depression where it may have once stood. Tobolwa was said to have been a local Nandi chief (kiruogindet) many years ago.

While the term “Sirikwa” has become a standard label for this archaeological culture, the historical Sirikwa people may have been only one group (though seemingly the most prominent) among many that participated in or contributed to this cultural horizon. The naming of the culture occurred retrospectively: 20th-century ethnographers linked the visible remnants of abandoned settlements (especially the Sirikwa holes) to the Sirikwa group, based on local oral testimony.
