= Peris Chepchumba =

Kenyan politician

Peris Chepchumba Simam (born 1968, Kapkoi near Eldoret) is a Kenyan politician. She belongs to the Orange Democratic Movement and was elected to represent the Eldoret South Constituency in the National Assembly of Kenya in the 2007 Kenyan parliamentary election.
