= AMPATH =

AMPATH (America's Path) was developed in 2000 as a high performance exchange point in Miami, Florida, United States. AMPATH assists peer based and network research between U.S. and international research and education networks.

Some of AMPATH's founding partners include REUNA of Chile, RNP of Brazil, CNTI of Venezuela, RETINA of Argentina, ANSP (Academic Network of São Paulo, a state-funded network), the University of Puerto Rico, New World Symphony, the Arecibo Observatory, the Gemini-South telescope, and Florida International University.

== Founding members ==
AMPATH's original corporate sponsors consist of Global Crossing, Terremark Worldwide Inc., Lucent Technologies, Cisco Systems, and Juniper Networks.

=== Julio Ibarra ===
Julio Ibarra, principal investigator, has been with AMPATH since its creation in 2000. In 2012 Ibarra received his PhD from the University of Twente in Enschede, Netherlands.

=== Heidi Alvarez ===
Heidi Alvarez serves as co-principal investigator for AMPATH. In 2006 Alvarez received her PhD from the Rotterdam School of Management, Erasmus University, in the Netherlands. She has held the position as Co-Pi for the AMPATH International Exchange Point since April, 2000. She is also Co-PI for the 2010 AmLight International Research Network Connections (NSF-IRNC) project for Latin America, Mexico and the Caribbean as well as for the AMPATH International Exchange Point in Miami.

=== Donald A. Cox ===
Donald A. Cox, chief operations officer, obtained his BS and MBA from Vanderbilt University, and in 2011 Cox received his PhD from the University of Western Australia.

== Network configuration ==
AMPATH's resources are composed of multiple of organizations, including its two primary connections with Atlantic Wave and Southern Light. AMPATH's network configuration consists of four major parts; 1) Layer2 ether connections, up to 10 Gigabits per second, including Ethernet VLANs mapped using Next-Generation SONET/SDH protocols 2) Packet Over SONET (POS)/Synchronous Date Hierarchy (SDH) connections 3) Asynchronous Transfer Mode (ATM) connections and 4) Standard interface configuration includes support for jumbo frames.

== History ==
Over the past decade the U.S. National Science Foundation has recognized AMPATH as a major research facility, supporting international e-Science.

=== 2002 ===
One of AMPATH's first achievements was connecting with the Academic Network at São Paulo (ANSP), the network of the State of São Paulo in Brazil. This connection included peering services with the Abilene Network.

AMPATH along with Internet2 was able to create a new link between Gemini's twin, 8-meter telescopes, located on Mauna Kea, Hawaii, and on Cerro Pachón in the Chilean Andes.

=== 2003 ===
In 2003 AMPATH was awarded a grant from the National Science Foundation for more than $500,000 to assist in connecting the Internet2's Abilene Network with regional universities and educational institutions in the United States, Latin America, and parts of the Caribbean.

=== 2005 ===
In the winter of 2005 AMPATH was involved in a globally distributed project known as UltraLight. Funded by the National Science Foundation, UltraLight was a transcontinental network aimed at monitoring and managing grid-based data analysis and fair sharing on long-range networks.

“The high-energy physics community is conducting a new round of experiments to probe the fundamental nature of matter and space-time and to understand the composition and early history of the universe. These experiments face unprecedented engineering challenges due to the volume and complexity of their data and the need for collaboration among scientists around the world...To overcome this limitation, major high-energy physics centers in the United States have formed the UltraLight consortium...Transcontinental and intercontinental wavelengths in our partner projects TransLight, Netherlight, UKlight, AMPATH, and CA*Net4 will be used for network experiments on a part-time or scheduled basis.”

=== 2007 ===
As of 2007 AMPATH has been involved with the Atlantic Wave Peering Project that enables network exchange and peering services through a variety of locations and supports the Global Lambda Integrated Facility’s Open Lightpath Exchange model.

=== 2008 ===
In May 2008 AMPATH, in conjunction with the EXPReS Project (Express Production Real-time e-VLBI Service), linked telescopes in Africa, Europe, North America and South America. The linkage simulated a singular telescope of almost 11,000 kilometers in diameter.
