= Elgon View =

Elgon View is a suburb located on the southern side of Eldoret, Kenya and named after Mt Elgon. It is primarily zoned for low-density residential housing. Considered an affluent neighborhood, Elgon View is home to politicians, athletes, businessmen and religious leaders of the Rift Valley Province. Institutions in the area include Eldoret State Lodge, the Eldoret Sports Club, Eldoret Club, Hill Primary and secondary schools, Mother of Apostles Seminary High School, and Testimony primary and secondary schools.

Notable residents include Ibrahim Hussein (runner), David Rudisha, Geoffrey Mutai, and many other athletes including Kipchoge Keino, who has led neighborhood opposition to all commercial development. In 2009, the Kenya Red Cross supported construction of a 5-star hotel in the suburb. Keino has opposed the construction on the grounds of setting a precedent for other commercial development as well as increased noise pollution and security concerns. Kenya Red Cross Governor Paul Birech cites benefits to the neighborhood as street lighting and pavement, sanitation services and public transportation. As of April 2012, construction of the hotel was at an advanced stage.

The construction was seen as a move to use the nonprofit status of a well-known organization to commercialize one of Eldoret's most secluded areas. Sure enough, the Kenyan Red passed on the ownership a few years after completing the buildings and the projects are now controlled by a foreign entity in Dubai.
