= Sirikwa holes =

Sirikwa holes are saucer-shaped hollows found on hillsides in the western highlands of Kenya and in the elevated stretch of the central Rift Valley around Nakuru. These hollows, each having a diameter of 10–20 metres and an average depth of 2.4 metres, occur in groups, sometimes numbering fewer than ten and at times more than a hundred. Archaeologists believe that construction of these features may have begun in the Iron Age.

== Etymology ==
Some accounts credit Mary Leakey with having introduced the term "Sirkiwa holes' following excavations at Hyrax Hill between 1937 and 1938. An account in the introduction to Hollis' book on the Nandi, published in 1909, indicates that the term Sirikwa was already in use:

...the Nandi have a tradition that they were once expelled from their country by the Sirikwa, a tribe who once lived on the Uasin Gishu plateau and built stone kraals

— From Introduction by Sir Charles Elliot to Hollis, A., The Nandi - Their Language and Folklore, Oxford, 1909

An origin narrative from the Sengwer gives an earlier origin of the name:

Sengwer had two sons named Sirikwa (elder) and Mitia. Sirikwa occupied the plains (Soi) of what is now part of Trans Nzoia, Lugari and Uasin Gishu districts. Sirikwa had his first son named Chepkoilel. The plains have since been referred to as Kapchepkoilel. The children of Sirikwa and Mitia form the sub-tribes of Sengwer...

It is thus likely that Sirikwa was the name of one of the two major groupings within the Sengwer of the Sirikwa era, and correctly passed on to Thompson from his Okiek guide as the descriptor of the name of the people who built those cattle pens that he saw in the Uasin Gishu. By 1909, the name had generally passed on to the wider culture associated with this type of structure and Mary Leakey picked it to describe the finds she found at Hyrax Hill. It has been argued by some that use of the word holes to describe the feature is misleading.

== Purpose ==
Excavations at several examples of these sites in the western highlands and in the Nakuru area show that they were deliberately constructed to house livestock.

== Features ==
=== Fencing ===
Excavations indicate that these hollows were surrounded by a fence or stockade and on the downhill side, a single gate, usually with extra works and flanking guard houses. In rocky terrain, notably the Uasin Gishu Plateau and the Elgeyo border, stone walling substituted for fencing or provided a base for the same.

At the time of the first recorded accounts during the late 18th centuries, some of the dry stone walling could still be seen though they were mostly in deteriorated state.

=== Housing ===
From the remains it is apparent that houses were not built inside the actual Sirikwa holes, they were attached however and were constructed on the outer side of the fence, being approached through the stock-pen and entered through a connecting door.

=== Rubbish mounds ===
Mounds are found in association with "Sirikwa holes" and are usually situated below the entrance and were formed by the dumping of mud, dung and general refuse from domestic use such as food bones and the occasional broken pot.
