= Hyrax Hill Prehistoric Site and Museum =

History museum near Nakuru, Kenya

Coordinates: 0.2796°S 36.1055°E

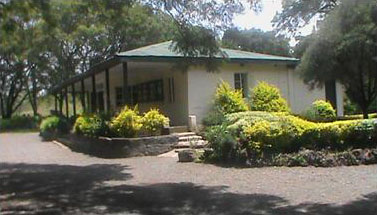
- Established: 1945
- Location: Nakuru, Kenya, 4 kilometres from town, half kilometre from Lake Nakuru
- Type: Prehistory, history and a natural history museum
- Visitors: During the year 2011 -2012, a total of 10,000 visitors mainly school parties visited
- Director: Dr Idle Farah
- Curator: Mr. Paul Odondo Oyuga
- Public transit access: The museum can be accessed through a road net work from Nakuru town or along Nairobi –Nakuru highway (A104 road).
- Website: www.museums.or.ke

The Hyrax Hill site was proclaimed a national monument in 1945 and opened to the public in 1965. This was as a result of startling discoveries of relics by Mrs. Selfe and subsequent archaeological excavations that were carried out by Dr. Mary Leakey in 1938 that revealed substantial findings in different areas of the site and levels of occupations. The late Mrs. Selfe was the owner of the property. The renovation of archaeology exhibit was made possible through the kind sponsorship of Kenya Museum Society and consultation of British Institute in Eastern Africa in collaboration with the National Museums of Kenya. The hill comprises particular importance because it encompasses several phases of occupation; it also has a long history of archaeological investigation, which began in 1937 with Mary Leakey.

== History of excavations ==
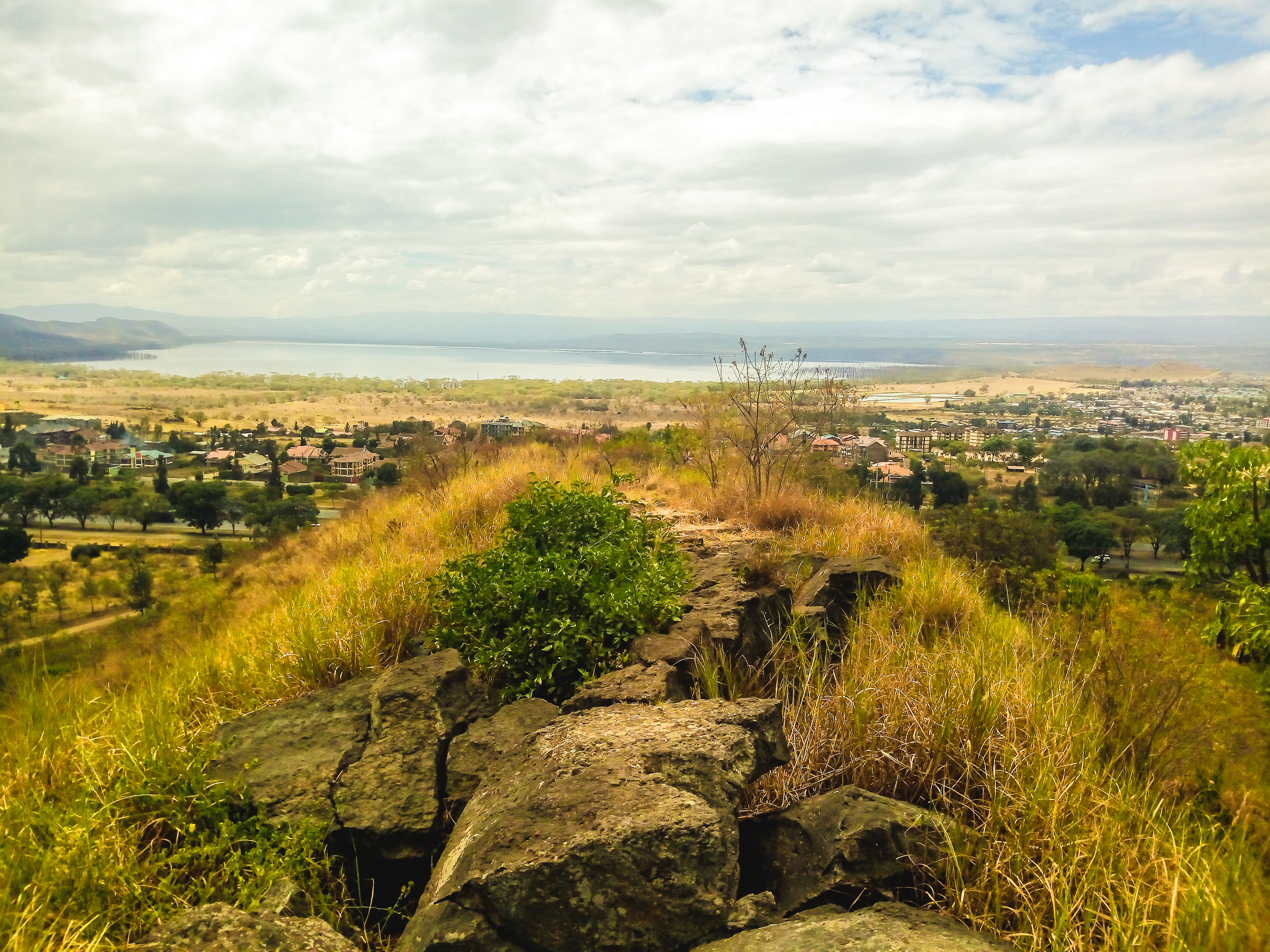
View from Hyrax Hill.

In 1937 Dr. Mary Leakey excavated Site I, and she discovered evidence of late Iron Age habitation consisting of a series of rough stone enclosures, and a number of burials. This material according to Sutton belongs to the late Iron Age and is probably around 200 yrs old (Sutton, 1987). During the 1937 excavation, Leakey also discovered a much older occupation layer, dating to the Late Stone Age. Several burials were uncovered; this area is today referred to as the "Neolithic mass grave" on signage at the Museum.

Dr. Mary Leakey in 1938 excavated Site II and erroneously associated the Sirikwa occupation layers with the pre-Iron Age material on Site I and at the Nakuru burial site.
In 1943 the unexcavated portions of the site were recognised as important archaeological resources, and the site was gazetted as a national monument on 26 November 1945.

In 1965 more excavations were carried by Ron Clarke on Site II, and the southern burial Site I. After these excavations, a small museum was established in the farm house which was previously owned by Mrs. A. Selfe.

Dr. Onyango Abunje in 1973–74 excavated the area adjacent to Site I, and he discovered mainly late Iron Age materials, which included two Iron Age pits and burial mounded.

In 1986, Dr. John Sutton re-investigated Site II and during this time, the investigation revealed three Sirikwa houses. Dr. Sutton concluded by proposing that Site II is indeed not related to Site II and is Iron Age dating to middle centuries of the second millennium.

== Governance ==
Hyrax Hill is a regional museum under the management of National Museums of Kenya headed by Prof. Mary Gikungu as its Director General. Hyrax Hill is currently run by 12 members of staff and headed by the curator as the chief accounting officer. Mr. Geoffrey Maranga is the Curator Hyrax Hill Museum.

== The museum building ==
The building was formerly a farm house constructed in about 1900–1910 and ceded to the National Museum of Kenya in 1965 by the owner, the late Mrs. Selfe. The building is rectangular in plan with a veranda along the south façade. It is entered through a 4.8 m wide straight stairway of 5 steps onto a veranda, and then into the main gallery through a protruding porch that forms part of the central space of the building. Inside, this building is divided into three chambers/galleries, the central being the largest. At the back, the building is abutted by two chambers which are used as the Curator's and Education offices respectively.

== Gallery ==
The museum has one gallery divided into three chambers; West, East and the central being the largest. The West chamber displays ethnographic materials. The Central chamber displays archaeology of the site; at the center of the gallery there is a model showing the entire site. The East chamber displays natural history objects.

== Hyrax Hill archaeology ==
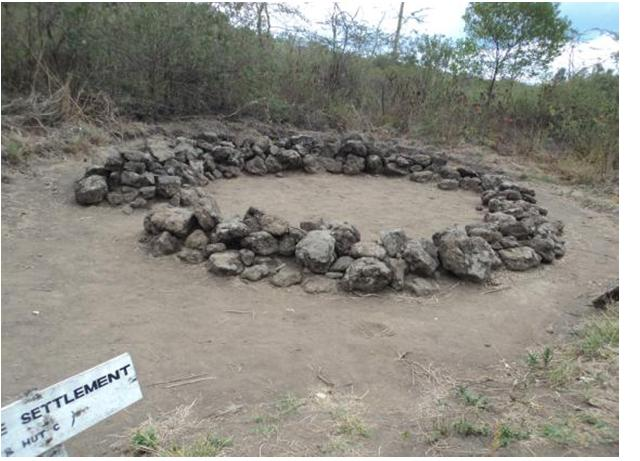
Neolithic and Iron Age site (Hyrax Hill Prehistoric Site and Museum, Nakuru, Kenya)

Hyrax Hill is small but a prominent rocky lava ridge measuring about 500 meters in length and rising to 50 meters above the surrounding plain. The hill owes its name to the numerous hyraxes that used to live in the rock openings. A number of archaeological features ranging in date from possibly 5000 years ago to only 200 years ago have been found on this hill. The oldest is the area of Neolithic occupation with burials on Site I. There is also recent Iron Age activity on Site I and earlier Iron Age activity on Site II. Interest in the archaeology of this area began in the 1920s with the discovery by a farmer of ancient burials with stone bowls hidden under rocks on the side of small hill to the north east. Louis Leakey investigated these ancient burials and reported that they belong to an early pastoralist community which he called 'Neolithic '. At the same time he noticed other archaeological features on both sides of hyrax hill, and in 1937 encouraged his wife, Mary, to investigate these. Hyrax Hill has been central to the development of archaeological research in Kenya for over seventy years. Together with other sites in the region, it has helped our understanding of the transition from a hunting and gathering way of life to greater dependence on food production, especially pastoral activities in these high grasslands.

== Exhibition sites ==
Among the 400 objects and works of art exhibited, visitors can admire carved masks, wood statues and other objects made by the Musas between 1970 and 2000. There are other objects collected from the grass-fields, such as traditional musical instruments, hunting gadgets, metal works, bamboo objects and pottery. Temporary exhibitions are also sometimes proposed.

== See also ==
- Mary Leakey
