= Hosea Kiplagat =

Kenyan politician (1945–2021)

Hosea Mundui Kiplagat (1945 – 6 February 2021) was a Kenyan politician, entrepreneur, and philanthropist. He belonged to the Tugen ethnic community. He was born to Isaac Salgong and Zipporah Salgong, a maternal cousin to the second president of Kenya, Daniel arap Moi, in 1945. Notably he was the longest serving Chairman of The Cooperative Bank of Kenya.

== Career ==
Kiplagat's first job was as a prison warder, but he resigned to venture into business. He became a successful businessman and it did not take long before he captured the attention of President Moi, who saw him as an efficient political mobilizer. During the entire Moi era Kiplagat was a close confidant of the president. He was a long-serving chairman of the Baringo branch of KANU.

Besides, he served as the Chairman of the Cooperative Bank of Kenya. Upon President Moi's retirement in 2002, Kiplagat supported Moi's chosen successor, Gideon Moi. Gideon won the election unopposed. However, in 2007 he ran for Baringo Central Parliamentary seat which was won by Sammy Mwaita in the ODM primaries. He polled third. In the March 2013 general elections, Kiplagat controversially lost to Sammy Mwaita. He then petitioned the High Court, which however upheld Mwaita's win.
