= Kabluk =

Kabluk (каблук) is the Russian word for a shoe's heel. It may refer to:

- Kabluk (chess move), a tactical combination in checkers
- Kabluk, the main character from Kabluk of the Eskimo, a 1932 book by Lowell Thomas

== See also ==
- Kapluk, a village in Kenya
- Kablukov (disambiguation)
- Kablukovo
