= 2013 Baringo local elections =

Local elections in Kenya

Local elections were held in Baringo County on 4 March 2013 to elect a Governor and County Assembly. Under the new constitution, which was passed in a 2010 referendum, the 2013 general elections were the first in which Governors and members of the County Assemblies for the newly created counties were elected.

== Gubernatorial election ==
Candidate	Running Mate	Coalition	Party	Votes
Benjamin Cheboi	Tuitoek, Mathew Kipyator		United Republican Party	--
Kibii, Samson Kigen	Arusei, William Kipkorir		Kenya National Democratic Alliance	--
Kiptis, Stanley K.	Chelugui, Simon Kiprono		Kenya African National Union	--
Koima, Joel Kibiwott	Chepkwony, Moses Koech		National Vision Party	--
Tuikong, Aaron Rotich	Kibet, Dorcas Jeptum		Agano Party	--

== Prospective candidates ==
The following are some of the candidates who have made public their intentions to run:

- Kiprono Chelugui
- Ben Cheboi
- Stanley Kiptis
