= Kapluk =

- Location within Kenya
- Coordinates: 0°34′07″N 35°39′53″E
- Country: Kenya
- County: Baringo County
- Time zone: UTC+3 (EAT)

Kapluk is a village in Baringo County, Kenya, in the base of Kerio Valley. The population is about 2000 people. The major ethnic group is the Tugen; the residents settled in the area around 1700 AD.

The major economic activity is farming crops such as cotton and maize, as well as animal keeping (especially goats and cows). It is the hub of the Kabutie location of the Barwesa division. There is a secondary school, four primary schools, a health center, 5 churches, and a cattle dip.

Kapluk is part of the Barwesa ward of Baringo North Constituency in Baringo County.

The current elections are over and Zaphania Chepkonga was declared the councillor after pulling ahead of Bowen Charles by 300 votes. Among those who stepped down for Zephania Chepkonga included Benjamin Ayabei, John Ruto, and Kigen Chris.

The crowning of the new councillor was marked with song and dance on 27 Dec 2007 at Muchukwo Centre, where the previous councillor promised to unite the people of Kabutiei.
