= Grace Kiptui =

Kenyan politician

Woman Representative for Baringo County
- In office 2013–2017

Personal details
- Born: Grace Kobilo Kiptui; 1967 (age 58–59) Kiboino, near Kabarnet, Kenya
- Party: United Republican Party
- Spouse: Daudi Kiptui
- Children: 3
- Education: University of Nairobi; Kenya School of Law
- Occupation: Politician, advocate
- Known for: Advocacy against female genital mutilation and community development initiatives

Grace Kobilo Kiptui (born 1967) is a Kenyan politician who served as the woman representative of Baringo County from 2013 until 2017. A member of the United Republican Party, she was elected in the 2013 elections. She is sometimes called "Mama County".

== Early life and education ==
Kiptui was born and brought up in Kiboino, a town near Kabarnet. She was educated at Kiboino Primary School and Kituro Boarding Primary School. In 1977, she joined Kapropita Girls' High School for her O-levels before proceeding to Bishop Gatimu Ngandu Girls' High School in 1981. She studied law at the University of Nairobi, graduating with a Bachelor of Laws in 1987. In 1988, she enrolled at the Kenya School of Law for a postgraduate law diploma.

== Professional career ==
Kiptui entered public service as a legal officer in the Attorney General's Chambers. Between 1993 and 2012, she worked in private practice as an advocate. She is a principal partner at Kiptui Kipkemei & Co. Advocates.

== Radio talk show ==
Since 2006, Kobilo has hosted a radio talk show on Kass FM educating the community on vital legal issues.

== Political career ==
Kiptui was elected the woman representative of Baringo County in the 2013 elections. She won by a landslide, garnering over 120,000 votes against Kaptuiya Cheboiwo's 25,000.

=== Campaign against female genital mutilation ===
She is a vocal campaigner against the practice of female genital mutilation and a champion of women empowerment.

=== Anti-jigger campaign ===
In conjunction with Ahadi Kenya Trust], a non-governmental organization, Kiptui has spearheaded a campaign against the jigger flea all over the county. The first phase of the programme covered the highland areas of Baringo Central Constituency and Baringo North Constituency.

== Personal life ==
She is married to Daudi Kiptui. They have three children.
