= Kampi Ya Samaki =

- Location within Kenya
- Coordinates: 0.6°N 36.02°E
- Country: Kenya
- County: Baringo County
- Time zone: UTC+3 (EAT)
- Climate: Aw
- Website: Baringo Eco Safaris

Kampi Ya Samaki is a settlement in Kenya's Baringo County, located on the shore of Lake Baringo. The name Ya Samaki is Swahili for 'fish camp'. Kampi ya is a landing bay for fishermen and also provides a market for their fish. The population of Kampi Ya Samaki are primarily from the Arror subtribe of the Tugen.
