= Baringo Central Constituency =

Electoral district of Kenya

Baringo Central
- constituency for the Parliament of Kenya
- Baringo Central Constituency within Baringo County

- Baringo County within Kenya
- County: Baringo County
- Population: 96,951
- Area: 786 km^{2} (303.5 sq mi)

Current constituency
- Number of members: 1
- Party: UDA
- Member of Parliament: Joshua Chepyegon Kandie
- Wards: 5

Baringo Central Constituency is an electoral constituency in Kenya. It is one of six constituencies in Baringo County. The constituency was established for the 1966 elections.

Kabarnet is the largest town located within this constituency.

Daniel arap Moi served as the MP for Baringo Central from 1966 until his retirement in 2002. From 1978, he concurrently served as President of Kenya. In the 1963 elections, he won the Baringo North Constituency seat. The current MP is Joshua Chepyegon Kandie of the United Democratic Alliance, who has served since August 2017.

== Members of Parliament ==
Elections	MP	Party	Notes
1966	Daniel arap Moi	KANU	One-party system
1969	Daniel arap Moi	KANU	One-party system
1974	Daniel arap Moi	KANU	One-party system
1979	Daniel arap Moi	KANU	One-party system
1983	Daniel arap Moi	KANU	One-party system
1988	Daniel arap Moi	KANU	One-party system
1992	Daniel arap Moi	KANU	Multi-party system, Moi elected unopposed as MP
1997	Daniel arap Moi	KANU	Multi party system, Moi challenged for the first time by Amos Kandie in the parliamentary contest
2002	Gideon Moi	KANU	Gideon Moi elected unopposed
2007	Sammy Mwaita	ODM	Gideon Moi defeated overwhelmingly.
2013	Sammy Mwaita	URP	
2017	Joshua Chepyegon Kandie	MCC	
2022	Joshua Chepyegon Kandie	UDA	To date

== Wards ==
Wards
Ward	Registered Voters	Local authority
Chebano	1,299	Kabarnet municipality
Kaprogonya	1,719	Kabarnet municipality
Kapsoo/Borowonin	988	Kabarnet municipality
Kinyo	823	Kabarnet municipality
Kituro	1,719	Kabarnet municipality
Seguton	3,471	Kabarnet municipality
Chebinyiny/Arabal	1,833	Baringo County council
Emom/Kisonei	1,829	Baringo County council
Ewalel Soi/Kimondis	1,107	Baringo County council
Ilchamus	1,364	Baringo County council
Kabarnet Soi	3,823	Baringo County council
Kabasis	1,939	Baringo County council
Kimalel	1,558	Baringo County council
Loboi	1,550	Baringo County council
Marigat	3,339	Baringo County council
Mochongoi	4,123	Baringo County council
Mukutani	1,666	Baringo County council
Ng'ambo	1,214	Baringo County council
Ng'et Moi	1,623	Baringo County council
Orokwo	2,153	Baringo County council
Sacho Mosop	1,930	Baringo County council
Sacho Soi	1,637	Baringo County council
Salabani	1,518	Baringo County council
Talai/Ewalel	3,668	Baringo County council
Tenges	2,746	Baringo County council
Total	50,639	
*September 2005,
