= Kabartonjo =

Coordinates: 00°38′N 35°48′E

Kabartonjo is the district headquarters of Baringo North District, Baringo County, Kenya.

Kabartonjo has a population of about 2,000. Its residents are mainly of the Arror dialect of the Tugen sub-tribe in the Kalenjin cluster but members of other tribes across Kenya are also available. Kabartonjo was founded in the early 20th century by Scottish missionaries who founded a church and a school. Kenya's second president, H.E. Daniel Toroitich Arap Moi went to school here, the primary school is now named in his honor. In the initial days of its existence, Kabartonjo was known to the locals as Kameshen, roughly translated as 'of-the-mission' due to the mission established there. The name Kabartonjo is the name of an influential clan that lives nearby who due to their influence in local politics managed to christen the town in their name.

Kabartonjo is an area that was populated by the Kaplumbei and Kapcheptinya clans. It is located on top of a ridge and all the surrounding land is used up hence its prospects of expansion are extremely limited. There is a shortage of water since there are no large rivers or dams nearby.

As the largest town in Baringo North, Kabartonjo is the hotbed of Arror politics.
