= A10 road (Kenya) =

Road in Kenya

A10 Road

Route information
- Maintained by Kenya National Highways Authority

Major junctions
- North end: Lokichar
- South end: Lamu

Location
- Country: Kenya

Highway system
- Transport in Kenya

The A10 road is a road in Kenya stretching a diagonal trajectory from Lokichar in the northwest to the port city of Lamu in the southeast, covering a planned distance of 970 kilometers. Currently, the route is in various stages of development, with certain sections yet to be constructed. As a key development axis, the A10 has the potential to play a role in connecting disparate regions and fostering economic growth. However, its full realization requires further infrastructure development to complete the envisioned route.

== Route ==
The A10 is a proposed upgrade to a network of road connections, which, as of 2020, consisted largely of underdeveloped dirt roads, with several sections missing and others merely consisting of desert tracks. Only limited portions had been paved, including a short stretch from Isiolo and a section between Kinyang and Loruk. The envisioned route will span from the A1 near Lokichar, traversing the Rift Valley and northern Kenya's deserts, to the coastal town of Lamu on the Indian Ocean. Notably, the route intersects with the A2 at Isiolo, a critical juncture, and crosses the A3 at Garissa. The terminus in Lamu also marks the endpoint of the A7 coastal road, highlighting the A10's potential as a vital link in Kenya's transportation infrastructure.

== History ==
=== Lamu Port and Lamu-Southern Sudan-Ethiopia Transport Corridor ===
The A10 road is being developed as part of the Lamu Port and Lamu-Southern Sudan-Ethiopia Transport Corridor (LAPSSET) project, a comprehensive initiative aimed at enhancing regional connectivity. Although initial feasibility studies date back to 1975, it wasn't until 2008 that a detailed study was undertaken to develop a new deep-sea port in Lamu and establish a transport corridor linking Kenya to Sudan, with the scope later expanded to include the newly independent nation of South Sudan. The project seeks to foster economic growth and facilitate trade across the region.

The project includes several elements:

- An oil refinery in Lamu
- Three airports
- Three resort towns: Lamu, Isiolo, and Lake Turkana
- A deep-sea port in Manda Bay, called Lamu Port
- A railway line from Lamu to Juba (South Sudan) and Addis Ababa (Ethiopia)
- A road network
- An oil pipeline

=== Construction of a paved road ===
The majority of the A10 route currently consists of unpaved dirt roads, dirt paths, and sandy tracks. However, some limited progress has been made in upgrading the road. Around 2012, a brief 4-kilometer stretch was paved, connecting the A2 highway in Isiolo to the east. Nevertheless, as of 2021, further development of this project had not commenced. Additionally, a 30-kilometer section between Nginyang and Loruk, formerly designated as the B4, was asphalted around 2017, marking a minor improvement in the road's overall condition. Despite these incremental upgrades, the route remains largely underdeveloped.

== Road number history ==
In 2016, the A10 designation was introduced as part of a comprehensive renumbering effort. This new classification encompassed a combination of existing roads and proposed connections, some of which were still in the planning stages or under construction at the time. The A10 route was thereby established, incorporating a mix of already-built infrastructure and envisioned links, with the aim of creating a cohesive and interconnected transportation network.

The A10 was routed over the following roads:

- C113: Lokori - Kinyang
- C46: Lokichar - Lokori
- B4: Kinyang - Loruk
- missing corridor: Kubi Turkana - north of Garissa
- C81: north of Garissa - Garissa
- missing corridor: Garissa - Ijara
- D568: Ijara - Hindi
- C112: Hindi - Lamu
- D370: Loruk - Mugle Ranch
- Missing corridor: Mugle Ranch - Isiolo
- B9: Isiolo - Kubi Turkana
