= Control of fire by early humans =

Aspect of human history

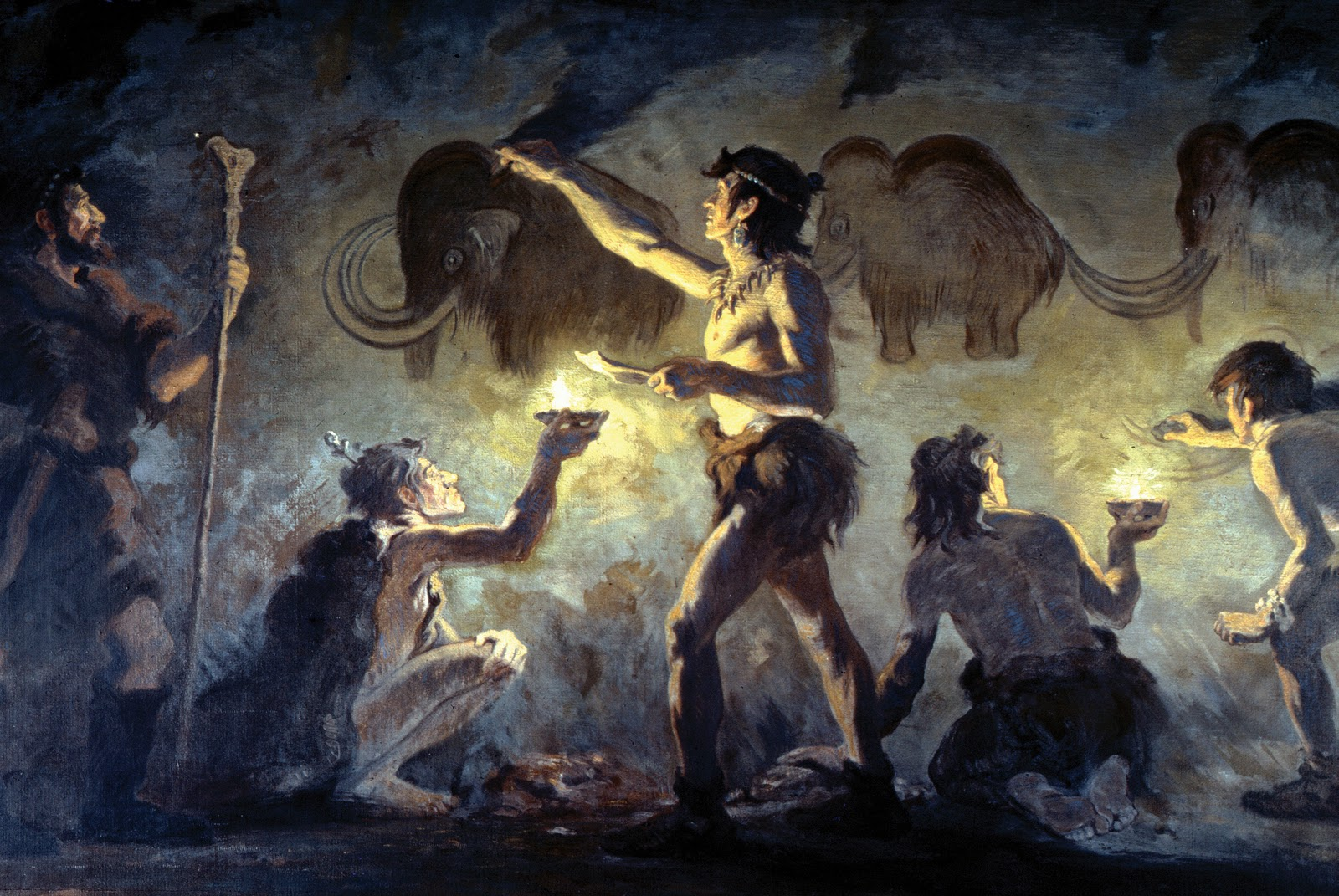
Cro-Magnon artists painting in Font-de-Gaume under the lighting of controlled fire, American Museum of Natural History, by Charles R. Knight (1920)

The control of fire by early humans was a critical technology enabling the evolution of humans. Fire provided a source of warmth and lighting, protection from predators (especially at night), a way to create more advanced hunting tools, and a method for cooking food. These advances allowed human geographic dispersal, cultural innovations, and changes to diet and behavior.

Evidence for using fire versus fire-making follows different timelines, as the earliest human fires were probably embers from lightning-ignited wildfires, carried back to a cave. Claims for the earliest evidence of using fire by a member of Homo range from as far back as 2.0 million years ago. Evidence of human use of fire has been found 1.79 million years ago in Wonderwerk Cave, South Africa where charred bones deep in the cave beyond the reach of natural wildfires have been found. There is scholarly support for "microscopic traces of wood ash" as evidence for use of fire by Homo erectus beginning ~1 million years ago.

At the Daughters of Jacob Bridge, Golan Heights, archaeologists found not only traces of fire usage, but also the oldest likely evidence for cooking of food (mainly, fish teeth that had been heated deep in a cave), dated to ~780,000 years ago. However, some studies suggest cooking could have started as early as ~1.8 million years ago, as indicated by reduced molar size and other physiological changes of Homo erectus.

The oldest definitive evidence for fire making (i.e. igniting a new fire) dates to ~400,000 years ago at a Neanderthal site in eastern England, where burnt soil was found along with fire-cracked flint handaxes and two fragments of iron pyrite, used to strike sparks with flint.

Fire was used regularly and systematically by early modern humans to heat-treat silcrete stone to increase its flake-ability for toolmaking ~164,000 years ago at the South African site of Pinnacle Point.

Evidence of the use of controlled fire becomes far more widespread, frequent, and convincing 400–300,000 years ago and becomes nearly as universal in its use by anatomically modern humans around 125–120,000 years ago as its use in the modern day.

== Control of fire ==
How (and when) did humans first make fire? – archaeologist Andrew Sorensen (Leiden University)

The use and control of fire was a gradual process proceeding through more than one stage. One was a change in habitat, from a dense forest where wildfires were rare but difficult to escape to a savanna where wildfires were common but easier to survive. Such a change may have occurred about 3 million years ago, when the savanna expanded in East Africa due to a cooler and drier climate.

The next stage involved interaction with burned landscapes and foraging in the wake of wildfires, as observed in various wild animals. In the African savanna, animals that preferentially forage in recently burned areas include savanna chimpanzees (a variety of Pan troglodytes verus), vervet monkeys (Cercopithecus aethiops) and a variety of birds, some of which also hunt insects and small vertebrates in the wake of grass fires.

The next step would be to make some use of residual hot spots that occur in the wake of wildfires. For example, food found in the wake of wildfires is often burned or undercooked. This might have provided incentives to place undercooked food in a hotspot or to pull food out of the fire if it was at risk of burning. This would require familiarity with fire and its behavior.

An early step in the control of fire would have been transporting it from burned to unburned areas and setting them on fire, providing advantages in food acquisition. Maintaining a fire over an extended period of time, as for a season (such as the dry season), may have led to the development of base campsites. Building a hearth or other fire enclosure, such as a circle of stones, would have been a later development. The ability to make fire, generally with a friction device with hardwood rubbing against softwood (as in a bow drill), was a later development.

Each of these stages could occur at different intensities, ranging from occasional or "opportunistic" to "habitual" to "obligate" (unable to survive without it).

== Lower Paleolithic evidence ==
Hominin timeline
| ← / Earlier apes; ← / Gorilla split; ← / Chimpanzee split; ← / Earliest bipedal; ← / Earliest sign of Ardipithecus; ← / Earliest sign of Australopithecus; ← / Earliest stone tools; ← / Earliest sign of Homo; ← / Dispersal beyond Africa; ← / Earliest fire / cooking; ← / Earliest rock art; ← / Earliest clothes; ← / Modern humans |
(million years ago)

Most evidence for controlled use of fire during the Lower Paleolithic is uncertain and has limited scholarly support. Some of the evidence is inconclusive because other plausible explanations, such as natural processes, exist for the findings. Findings support that the earliest known controlled use of fire took place in Wonderwerk Cave, South Africa, 1.0-1.79 Mya.

=== Africa ===
Findings from Wonderwerk provide the earliest evidence for controlled use of fire. Intact sediments were analyzed using micromorphological analysis. Fourier transform infrared microspectroscopy (mFTIR) yielded evidence, in the form of burned bones and ashed plant remains, that burning took place at the site 1.0-1.79 Mya.

East African sites, such as Chesowanja near Lake Baringo, Koobi Fora, and Olorgesailie in Kenya, provide possible evidence that early humans controlled fire. In Chesowanja, archaeologists found red clay clasts dated to 1.4 Mya. These clasts must have been heated to 400 °C (750 °F) to harden. However, tree stumps burned in bushfires in East Africa produce clasts that, when broken by erosion, are like those described at Chesownja. Controlled use of fire at Chesowanja is unproven.

In Koobi Fora, sites show evidence of fire control by Homo erectus at 1.5 Mya, with reddened sediment that could have come from heating at 200–400 °C (400–750 °F). Evidence of possible human control of fire, found at Swartkrans, South Africa, includes burned bones, including ones with hominin-inflicted cut marks, along with Acheulean and bone tools. This site shows some of the earliest evidence of carnivorous behavior in H. erectus. A "hearth-like depression" that could have been used to burn bones was found in Olorgesailie, Kenya. However, it did not contain any charcoal, and no signs of fire have been observed. Some microscopic charcoal was found, but it could have resulted from a natural brush fire.

In Gadeb, Ethiopia, fragments of welded tuff that appeared to have been burned were found in Locality 8E, but refiring of the rocks might have occurred due to local volcanic activity.

In the Middle Awash River Valley, cone-shaped depressions of reddish clay were found that could have been formed by temperatures of 200 °C (400 °F). These features, thought to have been created by burning tree stumps, were hypothesized to have been produced by early hominids lighting tree stumps to keep fire away from their habitation sites. This view is not widely accepted, though. Burned stones were found in the Awash Valley, but volcanic welded tuff is present in the area, which could explain them.

Burned flints discovered near Jebel Irhoud, Morocco, dated by thermoluminescence to around 300,000 years old, were discovered in the same sedimentary layer as skulls of early Homo sapiens. Paleoanthropologist Jean-Jacques Hublin believes the flints were used as spear tips and left in fires used by the early humans for cooking food.

=== Asia ===
In Xihoudu in Shanxi Province, China, the black, blue, and grayish-green discoloration of mammalian bones found at the site illustrates evidence of burning by early hominids. In 1985, at a parallel site in China, Yuanmou in Yunnan Province, archaeologists found blackened mammal bones that date back to 1.7 Mya.

==== Middle East ====
A site at Bnot Ya'akov Bridge, Israel, has been claimed to show that H. erectus or H. ergaster controlled fires between 790,000 and 690,000 BP. An AI-powered spectroscopy helped researchers unearth evidence of the use of fire dating 800,000 and 1 million years ago. In an article published in June 2022, researchers from Weizmann Institute of Science, along with researchers at the University of Toronto and Hebrew University of Jerusalem, described the use of deep learning models to analyze heat exposure of 26 flint tools that were found in 1970s at the Evron Quarry in the northwest of Israel. The results showed that the tools were heated to 600 °C.

==== Southeast Asia ====
At Trinil, Java, burned wood has been found in layers that carried H. erectus (Java Man) fossils dating from 830,000 to 500,000 BP. The burned wood has been claimed to indicate the use of fire by early hominids.

== Middle Paleolithic evidence ==
=== Africa ===
The Cave of Hearths in South Africa has burn deposits dating from 700,000 to 200,000 BP, as do various other sites, such as Montagu Cave (200,000 to 58,000 BP) and the Klasies River Mouth (130,000 to 120,000 BP).

Strong evidence comes from Kalambo Falls in Zambia, where several artifacts related to human use of fire have been recovered, including charred logs, charcoal, carbonized grass stems and plants, and wooden implements that may have been hardened by fire. The site has been dated to 180,000 BP using radiocarbon dating and amino-acid racemization.

Fire was used for heat treatment of silcrete stones to increase their workability before they were knapped into tools by Stillbay culture in South Africa. These Stillbay sites date back from 164,000 to 72,000 years ago, with the heat treatment of stone beginning by about 164,000 years ago.

=== Asia ===
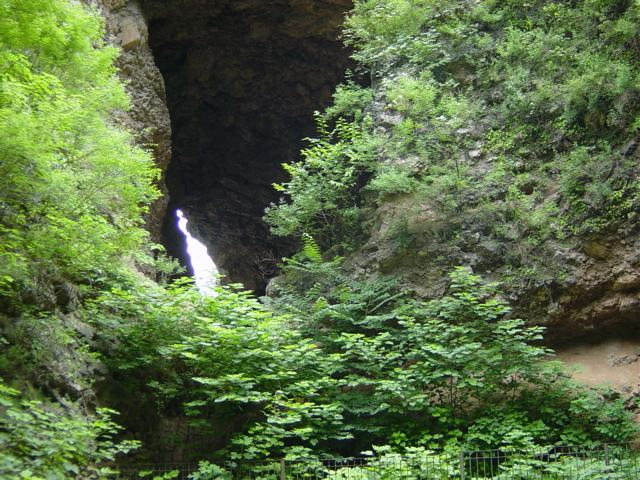
Zhoukoudian Caves, a World Heritage Site and an early site of human use of fire in China

Evidence at Zhoukoudian cave in China suggests control of fire as early as 460,000 to 230,000 BP. Fire in Zhoukoudian is suggested by the presence of burned bones, burned chipped-stone artifacts, charcoal, ash, and hearths alongside H. erectus fossils in Layer 10, the earliest archaeological horizon at the site. This evidence comes from Locality 1, also known as the Peking Man site, where several bones were found to be uniformly black to grey. The bone extracts were determined to be characteristic of burned bone rather than manganese staining. These residues also showed IR spectra for oxides, and a turquoise bone was reproduced in the laboratory by heating some of the other bones found in Layer 10. The same effect might have occurred at the site due to natural heating, as it was observed on white, yellow, and black bones.

Layer 10 is ash containing biologically produced silicon, aluminum, iron, and potassium, but wood-ash remnants such as siliceous aggregates are absent. Among these are possible hearths "represented by finely laminated silt and clay interbedded with reddish-brown and yellow-brown fragments of organic matter, locally mixed with limestone fragments and dark brown finely laminated silt, clay, and organic matter." The site itself does not show that fires were made in Zhoukoudian, but the association of blackened bones with quartzite artifacts at least shows that humans did control fire at the time of the habitation of the Zhoukoudian cave.

==== West Asia ====
At the Amudian site of Qesem Cave, near the city of Kfar Qasim, Israel, evidence exists of the regular use of fire from before 382,000 BP to around 200,000 BP, at the end of Lower Pleistocene. Large quantities of burned bone and moderately heated soil lumps were found; the cut marks found on the bones suggest that butchering and prey-defleshing took place near fireplaces. In addition, hominins living in Qesem cave managed to heat their flint to varying temperatures before knapping it into different tools.

==== Indian subcontinent ====
The earliest evidence for controlled fire use by humans on the Indian subcontinent, dating to between 50,000 and 55,000 years ago, comes from the Main Belan archaeological site, located in the Belan River valley in Uttar Pradesh, India.

=== Europe ===
Multiple sites in Europe, such as Torralba and Ambrona, Spain, and St. Esteve-Janson, France, have also shown evidence of the use of fire by later versions of H. erectus. The oldest has been found in England at the site of Beeches Pit, Suffolk; uranium series dating and thermoluminescence dating place the use of fire at 415,000 BP. At Vértesszőlős, Hungary, while no charcoal has been found, burned bones have been discovered dating from c. 350,000 years ago. At Torralba and Ambrona, Spain, objects such as Acheulean stone tools, remains of large mammals, including extinct elephants, charcoal, and wood were discovered. At Terra Amata in France, there is a fireplace with ashes (dated between 380,000 BP and 230,000 BP). At Saint-Estève-Janson in France, there is evidence of five hearths and reddened earth in the Escale Cave; these hearths have been dated to 200,000 BP. Evidence for fire making dates to at least the Middle Paleolithic, with dozens of Neanderthal hand axes from France exhibiting use-wear traces suggesting these tools were struck with the mineral pyrite to produce sparks around 50,000 years ago.

== Deliberate fire-making ==
In 2017, archeologists Harold L. Dibble and Dennis Sandgathe stated that it has long been held that humans could create fire "long before Neanderthals came along some 250,000 years ago," pointing out the difficulties of migrating to northern Europe and Asia without fire.

Homo sapiens in Africa and Neanderthals in Europe may have independently discovered the techniques of the fire drill and striking two stones to create a spark, respectively.

In 2018, geologist Andrew Cunningham Scott wrote that "the use of flints to start fire may have occurred as far back as 400,000 years ago," though noted that evidence at the time was limited.

As of December 2025, the earliest evidence of humans making fire rather than using or tending natural fires comes from an excavation in Barnham, Suffolk, England. Scientists found baked earth with flint and pyrite, which can be used to make a spark. As pyrite is rare in the area, they inferred that people had travelled tens of kilometres to chalky coast areas to obtain it, showing that the fire was deliberately created. Soil analysis also showed that several short-lived fires had burnt in the same spot, as opposed to a few larger wildfires. Analysis of skeletons found nearby suggested that the fires had been made by early Neanderthals. The researchers believe that there were likely several other sites in Europe where fire was also made, and that the knowledge had been brought into Britain from the European mainland via a land bridge. Apart from the Barnham site, the earliest definite evidence for humans making fire is from a site in northern France, which was occupied 50,000 years ago.

=== Significance ===
Being able to make fire, rather than relying on natural fires, was an important moment in human evolution. Dr Rob Davis, who co-led the investigation at Barnham, said that "The ability to create and control fire is one of the most important turning points in human history with practical and social benefits that changed human evolution." Professor Chris Stringer of the Natural History Museum said: "Having something that could give you instant fire when you need it, where you need it, was crucial for people moving into places like Britain 400,000 years ago – it made them more adaptable, enlarged the range of environments they could survive in, and helped catalyse the evolution of social complexity, brain growth and probably even language itself."

Scientists suggest that the ability to make fire on demand helped create places for people to gather during the night, perhaps sharing food and developing language, making them more sociable and helping their brains develop. Another is that it lets people cook more easily, which makes eating more efficient. They may also have used it to scare away predators or to make glue from resin. Leiden University professor Wil Roebroeks expressed skepticism towards the study, opining that most of the evidence is circumstantial.

== Impact on human evolution ==
=== Cultural innovation ===
==== Uses of fire by early humans ====
The discovery of fire provided early hominids with a range of uses. Its warmth kept them alive during low nighttime temperatures in colder environments, allowing geographic expansion from tropical and subtropical climates to temperate areas. Its blaze warded off predatory animals, especially in the dark.

Fire also played a major role in changing food habits. Cooking allowed a significant increase in meat consumption and calorie intake. It was soon discovered that meat could be dried and smoked by fire, preserving it for lean seasons. Fire was even used in manufacturing tools for hunting and butchering. Hominids also learned that starting bushfires to burn large areas could increase soil fertility and clear terrain to make hunting easier. Evidence shows that early hominids were able to corral and trap prey animals using fire. Fire was used to clear out caves before living in them, helping to begin the use of shelter. The many uses of fire may have led to specialized social roles, such as the separation of cooking from hunting.

The control of fire enabled important changes in human behavior, health, energy expenditure, and geographic expansion. After the loss of body hair, hominids could move into much colder regions that would have previously been uninhabitable. Evidence of more complex management to change biomes can be found as far back as 200,000 to 100,000 years ago, at minimum.

==== Tool and weapon making ====
Fire allowed major innovations in tool and weapon manufacture. Evidence dating to roughly 164,000 years ago indicates that early humans in South Africa during the Middle Stone Age used fire to alter the mechanical properties of tool materials applying heat treatment to a fine-grained rock called silcrete. The heated rocks were then tempered into crescent-shaped blades or arrowheads for hunting and butchering prey. This may have been the first time that bow and arrow were used for hunting, with far-ranging impact.

==== Art and ceramics ====
Fire was used in the creation of art. Archaeologists have discovered several 1- to 10-inch Venus figurine statues in Europe dating to the Paleolithic, several carved from stone and ivory, others shaped from clay and then fired. These are some of the earliest examples of ceramics. Fire was also commonly used to create pottery. Although pottery was formerly thought to have begun with the Neolithic around 10,000 years ago, scientists in China discovered pottery fragments in the Xianrendong Cave that were about 20,000 years old. During the Neolithic Age and agricultural revolution about 10,000 years ago, pottery became far more common and widespread, often carved and painted with simple linear designs and geometric shapes.

==== Social development and nighttime activity ====
Fire was an important factor in the expansion and development of early hominid societies. One impact fire might have had was social stratification. The power to make and wield fire may have conferred prestige and social position. Fire also led to a lengthening of daytime activities and allowed more nighttime activities. Evidence of large hearths indicates that the majority of nighttime was spent around the fire. The increased social interaction from gathering around the fire may have fostered the development of language.

Another effect of fire use on hominid societies was that it required larger groups to work together to maintain the fire, find fuel, add it, and re-ignite it when necessary. These larger groups might have included older individuals, such as grandparents, who helped to care for children. Ultimately, fire significantly influenced the size and social interactions of early hominid communities.

Exposure to artificial light during later hours of the day changed humans' circadian rhythms, contributing to a longer waking day. The modern human's waking day is 16 hours, while many mammals are only awake for half as many hours. Additionally, humans are most awake during the early evening hours, while other primates' days begin at dawn and end at sundown. Many of these behavioral changes can be attributed to the control of fire and its impact on daylight extension.

=== The cooking hypothesis ===
The cooking hypothesis proposes that the ability to cook allowed hominid brain size to increase over time. This idea was first presented by Friedrich Engels in the article "The Part Played by Labour in the Transition from Ape to Man" and later recapitulated in the book Catching Fire by Richard Wrangham and then in a book by Suzana Herculano-Houzel. Critics of the hypothesis argue that cooking with controlled fire was insufficient to start the increasing brain size trend.

The cooking hypothesis gains support by comparing the nutrients in raw food to the much more easily digested nutrients in cooked food, as in an examination of protein ingestion from raw vs. cooked egg. Scientists have found that among several primates, the restriction of feeding to raw foods during daylight hours limits the metabolic energy available. Genus Homo was able to break through the limit by cooking food to shorten their feeding times and be able to absorb more nutrients to accommodate the increasing need for energy. In addition, scientists argue that the Homo species was also able to obtain nutrients like docosahexaenoic acid from algae that were especially beneficial and critical for brain evolution. The cooking process enabled early humans to detoxify food and access these resources.

Besides the brain, other human organs also demand a high metabolism. During human evolution, the body-mass proportion of different organs changed to allow brain expansion.

==== Changes to diet ====
Before the advent of fire, the hominid diet was limited to mostly plant parts composed of simple sugars and carbohydrates such as seeds, flowers, and fleshy fruits. Parts of the plant, such as stems, mature leaves, enlarged roots, and tubers, would have been inaccessible as a food source due to the indigestibility of raw cellulose and starch. Cooking, however, made starchy and fibrous foods edible and greatly increased the diversity of other foods available to early humans. Toxin-containing foods, including seeds and similar carbohydrate sources, such as cyanogenic glycosides found in linseed and cassava, were incorporated into their diets as cooking rendered them nontoxic.

Cooking could also kill parasites, reduce the amount of energy required for chewing and digestion, and release more nutrients from plants and meat. Due to the difficulty of chewing raw meat and digesting tough proteins (e.g., collagen) and carbohydrates, the development of cooking served as an effective means of processing meat and enabling its consumption in larger quantities. With its high caloric density and important nutrient content, meat became a staple in the diet of early humans. By increasing digestibility, cooking allowed hominids to maximize the energy gained from consuming foods. Studies show that caloric intake from cooking starches improves by 12–35%, and 45–78% for protein. As a result of the increases in net energy gain from food consumption, survival and reproductive rates in hominids increased. Through lowering food toxicity and increasing nutritive yield, cooking allowed for an earlier weaning age, permitting females to have more children. In this way, too, it facilitated population growth.

It has been proposed that the use of fire for cooking caused environmental toxins to accumulate in the placenta, leading to a species-wide taboo on human placentophagy around the time of the mastery of fire. Placentophagy is common in other primates.

==== Biological changes ====
Before their use of fire, the hominid species had large premolars, which were used to chew harder foods, such as large seeds. In addition, due to the shape of the molar cusps, the diet is inferred to have been more leaf- or fruit-based. Probably in response to consuming cooked foods, the molar teeth of H. erectus gradually shrank, suggesting that their diet had changed from more challenging foods such as crisp root vegetables to softer cooked foods such as meat. Cooked foods further selected for the differentiation of their teeth and eventually led to a decreased jaw volume with a variety of smaller teeth in hominids. Today, a smaller jaw volume and teeth size of humans is seen in comparison to other primates.

Due to the increased digestibility of many cooked foods, less digestion was needed to procure the necessary nutrients. As a result, the gastrointestinal tract and organs in the digestive system decreased in size. This is in contrast to other primates, in which a larger digestive tract is needed to ferment long carbohydrate chains. Thus, humans evolved from the large colons and tracts that are seen in other primates to smaller ones.

According to Wrangham, fire control allowed hominids to sleep on the ground and in caves rather than in trees, and led to more time spent on the ground. This may have contributed to the evolution of bipedalism, as such an ability became increasingly necessary for human activity.

==== Criticism ====
Critics of the hypothesis argue that, while a linear increase in brain volume in the genus Homo is observed over time, the advent of fire control and cooking does not meaningfully contribute to the data. Species such as H. ergaster existed with large brain volumes during periods with little to no evidence of cooking fire. Little variation exists in the brain sizes of H. erectus dated from periods of weak and strong evidence for cooking. An experiment involving mice fed raw versus cooked meat found that cooking meat did not increase the amount of calories taken up by mice, leading to the study's conclusion that the energetic gain is the same, if not greater, in raw meat diets than cooked meats. Studies such as this and others have led to criticisms of the hypothesis that state that the increases in human brain size occurred well before the advent of cooking due to a shift away from the consumption of nuts and berries to the consumption of meat. Other anthropologists argue that the evidence suggests that cooking fires began in earnest only 250,000 BP, when ancient hearths, earth ovens, burned animal bones; flint appeared across Europe and the Middle East.

== See also ==
- Hunting hypothesis
- Savannah hypothesis
- Theft of fire
