= Maji Mata =

Maji Moto
- Location within Kenya
- Coordinates: 0.27°N 36.05°E
- Country: Kenya
- County: Baringo County
- Time zone: UTC+3 (EAT)

Maji Mata is a settlement in Kenya's Baringo County.
