= Chepyegon =

Chepyegon is a given name and surname. Notable people with the name include:

- Daniel Kipkorir Chepyegon, Ugandan runner
- Joshua Chepyegon Kandie, Kenyan politician
