= Loruk =

- Location within Kenya
- Coordinates: 0.72°N 36.03°E
- Country: Kenya
- County: Baringo County
- Time zone: UTC+3 (EAT)

Loruk is a settlement in Kenya's Baringo County. It is inhabited by the pastoralist Arror people. Loruk trading center serves the Arror, the neighbouring Pokot, and to a small extend, the agro-pastoralist Njemps people living around the Lake Baringo. The population size varies with the seasons but is estimated to comprise around 500 families. Loruk houses a primary school, a secondary school, a clinic, a number of churches and a police station.
