= Sibillo =

- Settlement
- Location within Kenya
- Coordinates: 0.7042°N 35.8985°E
- Country: Kenya
- County: Baringo County
- Elevation: 1,276 m (4,186 ft)
- Time zone: UTC+3 (EAT)

Sibillo is a settlement in Baringo County, Kenya. It lies at an elevation of approximately 1,276 metres (4,189 ft) above sea level.

== Geography ==
Sibillo is located in the central part of Baringo County at latitude 0.7042°N and longitude 35.8985°E.

== Administration ==
The settlement falls within Baringo North Constituency and is part of the Sibilo ward.

== Mapping and data ==
OpenStreetMap and Wikidata identify Sibillo as a recognized village (Wikidata item: Q7507077).
