= Baringo =

Baringo may refer to:

- Lake Baringo, Kenya
- Baringo County, Kenya
