= Grace Mumbi Ngugi =

Judge of the High Court of Kenya

Hon. Lady Justice Grace Mumbi Ngugi

Judge of the High Court of Kenya
- Incumbent
- Assumed office 2011

Personal details
- Born: Banana Hill, Kiambu County, Kenya
- Education: University of Nairobi (LLB); London School of Economics (LLM); Kenya School of Law (Diploma)
- Occupation: Judge
- Profession: Lawyer
- Known for: Human rights advocacy
- Awards: Member of the Order of the Burning Spear (MBS); Jurist of the Year Award; Global Jurist of the Year Award; Judicial Integrity Award; Distinguished Service Award; C.B. Madan Prize; Brand Kenya Ambassador Award

Grace Mūmbi Ngūgì, Member of the Order of the Burning Spear (MBS), is a Kenyan lawyer and a judge of the High Court of Kenya. She works in the Anti-Corruption and Economic Crimes Division of the Court. She was appointed to the High Court in 2011 and has played a significant role in the development of constitutional and human rights jurisprudence in Kenya following the promulgation of the 2010 Constitution. Ngugi is particularly noted for her rulings on governance, accountability, and anti-corruption, as well as her contributions to the protection of fundamental rights and freedoms. In addition to her judicial work, she has been active in legal research, civil society, and advocacy, including co-founding the Albinism Foundation of East Africa. She is a recipient of several national and international honours, including the Global Jurist of the Year Award in 2021.

== Early life and education ==
Grace Mūmbi Ngūgì was born in Banana Hill, Kiambu County. She was born with albinism to a family of 11 siblings. Ngūgì attended Thìndìgua Primary School. She achieved a score of 35 out of a possible 36 points in the Kenya Certificate of Primary Education (KCPE) examinations. She joined Ngandu Girls High School in Nyeri. She got a Bachelor of Laws degree from the University of Nairobi and later obtained a Master of Laws (LL.M.) from the London School of Economics and Political Science, where she was a recipient of the Overseas Development Administration Shared Scholarship (ODASS). She also holds a diploma in Law from the Kenya School of Law.

== Career ==
Ngūgì was admitted to the Kenyan Bar in 1988. She began her career as a State Counsel at the Attorney General’s Chambers (1989) and also worked as Legal Counsel and Company Secretary at Pioneer General Assurance between 1989 and 1993. She was in private practice as a partner at Njogu and Ngugi Advocates from 1993 to 2011.

She has also worked in civil society and public sector roles, including as Legal Counsel for the Federation of Women Lawyers (FIDA–Kenya) where she represented victims of gender-based violence following the 2007–2008 post-election violence, including presenting evidence before the Commission of Inquiry into Post-Election Violence (Waki Commission). She was also an Associate Consultant at the Legal Resources Foundation and a part-time researcher on civil society and governance in East Africa for the Series on Alternative Research in East Africa Trust (SAREAT). Between 2006 and 2011, she served as Lead Researcher and Compiler of the Biannual Human Rights Reports at the Kenya Human Rights Commission, and in 2010 she acted as a legal consultant for the Ministry of Transport and Kenya Railways Corporation on the Resettlement Action Plan. She was named ambassador for Brand Kenya in 2013.

== Judicial career ==
She was appointed to the High Court of Kenya in 2011, first at the Constitutional and Human Rights Division at the Milimani High Court. She was among the early judges who contributed to the development of jurisprudence following the promulgation of the Constitution of Kenya, 2010. In April 2016, she was transferred to Kericho High Court, where she served as Presiding Judge. From 2016 to 2019, she led the High Court at Kericho before being appointed in March 2019 as Presiding Judge of the Anti-Corruption and Economic Crimes Division at the Milimani High Court.

== Judicial contributions ==
Ngūgì has played a significant role in shaping constitutional and human rights jurisprudence in Kenya. Her decisions have addressed issues relating to constitutional interpretation, governance, and accountability. In Anthony Njenga Mbuti & 5 Others v Attorney General & 3 Others, she limited the application of the presumption of constitutionality of legislation to statutes enacted before the 2010 Constitution. In Moses Kasaine Lenolkulal v Director of Public Prosecutions, she upheld restrictions barring a public official charged with corruption from accessing office, emphasizing the need to safeguard public interest and prevent interference with investigations.

In 2019, Ngūgì issued rulings relating to the prosecution of corruption cases involving public officials. In a decision delivered on 24 July 2019, she held that public officers charged with corruption-related offences could be barred from accessing their offices while their cases were pending.

In a subsequent ruling on 1 October 2019, she determined that investigators could conduct searches in the offices and residences of corruption suspects without prior notice, subject to legal safeguards. These decisions were considered significant in the development of anti-corruption jurisprudence in Kenya.

Her human rights decisions have included rulings affirming the rights of children born outside marriage to be recognized in official records and clarifying the jurisdiction of the High Court in enforcing fundamental rights and freedoms.

== Research, writing and advocacy ==
Ngūgì has authored over 13 reports and papers on legal and human rights issues and has contributed to public discourse through publications in media outlets such as The Standard, Daily Nation, and The Lawyer magazine. She is the co-founder of the Albinism Foundation of East Africa, the foundation consists of persons with albinism, parents of children with albinism, and professionals with an interest in advocating for the rights of people with albinism. Established in 2008 to advocate for the rights and social inclusion of persons with albinism and to combat stigma and discrimination.

== International leadership and engagements ==
Ngūgì has held several international and regional leadership roles in the fields of human rights, judicial education, and legal reform. She serves as Chairperson of the Judicial Education Sub-Committee of the Africa Judges Forum on HIV and AIDS. She is a member of the International Association of Refugee Law Judges and the Regional Judges’ Forum on HIV, Human Rights and the Law. She has contributed to international legal development as a consultant in the preparation of the Commonwealth Judicial Bench Book on Violence against Women in East Africa, a key resource for judges handling gender-based violence cases.

Ngūgì has also been involved in global academic and professional exchanges. In 2021, she was awarded the Global Jurist of the Year Award by the Northwestern Pritzker School of Law Center for International Human Rights in recognition of her contributions to human rights, particularly for women, marginalized communities, and persons with albinism. She has further participated in international policy and research networks, including selection to the Rockefeller Bellagio Center Practitioner Residency, which brings together global leaders across sectors to address social challenges.

In addition, she has served as patron of the Cambridge University Commonwealth Law Journal and has contributed to international legal scholarship through her research, writing, and participation in global forums.

== Awards and recognition ==
She was selected for the Rockefeller Bellagio Center Practitioners Residency in 2010

2013 – Jurist of the Year Award, awarded by the International Commission of Jurists Kenya

2013 – Brand Kenya Ambassador Award

2015 – Member of the Order of the Burning Spear (MBS), conferred by the Government of Kenya

2015 – Distinguished Service Award, awarded by the Law Society of Kenya

2018 – C.B. Madan Prize

2019 – Judicial Integrity Award, awarded by Transparency International

2021 – Global Jurist of the Year Award
