= William Kipkorir =

Kenyan politician (1967–2025)

Member of Parliament for Baringo North
- Succeeded by: Joseph Makilap

Personal details
- Born: 1967
- Died: 15 February 2025 (aged 57)
- Party: United Democratic Alliance
- Profession: Politician

William Kipkorir (1967 – 15 February 2025) was a Kenyan politician. He belonged to the United Democratic Alliance party and was elected to represent the Baringo County in the Senate of Kenya from the 2022 General election onwards. He managed to win against Gideon Moi. He was a member of parliament for Baringo North. Kipkorir died on 15 February 2025, at the age of 57. He was member of parliament of Baringo North for three terms.
