= Ol Arabel =

- Location within Kenya
- Coordinates: 0.307959°N 36.211538°E
- Country: Kenya

Ol Arabel (or Olarabel) is a river in the Great Rift Valley of Kenya that feeds Lake Baringo. It gives its name to a forest covering its headwaters and to a region.

== River ==
The Ngusero and Ol Arabel rivers drain the northern end of the Aberdare Range. The river forms a delta where it enters the southeast of Lake Baringo at 0.531113°N 36.115837°E, and this forms a dense marsh during periods when the lake level is relatively high. The river is seasonal and in the dry period of the early 2000s no longer reached the lake.

== Historical land use ==
In the past the region was used by Il Chamus herders. In the 1930s growing numbers of Tugen agropastoralists moved into the area, with some official encouragement. In the 1940s squatters moved into the Ol Arabel Forest Reserve in Laikipia District and cultivated 84 acres of land, eventually being evicted in 1947. In the 1970s the government operated a settlement scheme in Ol Arabel, but later attempted to convert the land back to forest. The Harambee settlement scheme involved 6,000 hectares (15,000 acres) to be used for cattle raising and cultivation of maize.

== Forest reserve ==
The Ol Arabel Forest Reserve is part of the Marmanet forests on the eastern escarpment of the Rift Valley, north of Nyahururu. The forest reserve, which is part of the upper catchment of the Ol Arabel River, once covered 9,629 hectares (23,790 acres), but 6,273 hectares (15,500 acres) were excised in 1993. No boundary plan was defined. As a result, about 80% of the forest had been settled by the Mochongoi settlement scheme as of 2008.

In May 2007 it was announced that the European Union was funding efforts to replant forests in the region, including the Ol Arabel forest. In the past ten years Lake Baringo had been silting up and shrinking in area due to increased agriculture and reduced forest cover in its watershed, with economically important fish stocks dropping significantly. In September 2011 an officer of the Green Belt movement said the Ol Arabel forest was almost extinct due to illegal loggers and particularly to charcoal burners. The police were making no effort to prevent their activities. The rivers fed by the forest were about to dry up.
