= KPC Ngong Forest land scandal =

Kenyan corruption scandal

The KPC Ngong Forest land scandal resulted in the suspension of Kenyan Government Minister William Ruto and was charged in court as a result.

William Ruto and "four other persons" faced fraud charges over the alleged sale of a piece of land in Ngong Forest to Kenya Pipeline Company (KPC) for Sh272 million. The minister allegedly received Sh96 million during the transaction.

In April 2011, Ruto was acquitted of the Sh43 million land fraud charges for lack of evidence. His co-accused, Joshua Kulei and Sammy Mwaita, were also set free.
