= Kamarr =

- Location within Kenya
- Coordinates: 0.27°N 36.02°E
- Country: Kenya
- County: Baringo County
- Time zone: UTC+3 (EAT)
- Climate: Aw

Kamarr is a settlement in Kenya's Baringo County.
