= Mochongoi =

- Location within Kenya
- Coordinates: 0.308635°N 36.192213°E
- Country: Kenya
- County: Baringo County

Mochongoi is a community and a division in Baringo County, Kenya. It is also an electoral ward in Marigat subcounty. The town lies in the northern end of the Aberdare Range and is a relatively new settlement in what was the Ol Arabel forest reserve.

The Ol Arabel Forest Reserve is part of the Marmanet forests on the eastern escarpment of the Rift Valley, north of Nyahururu. The forest reserve, which is part of the upper catchment of the Ol Arabel River, once covered 9,629 hectares (23,790 acres), but 6,273 hectares (15,500 acres) were excised in 1993. No boundary plan was defined. As a result, about 80% of the forest had been settled by the Mochongoi settlement scheme by 2008.

The division covers 329 square kilometres (127 sq mi). In 2001 the population was 11,927. The community includes a secondary school. Maize farmers have protested that middlemen were not paying adequate prices. In October 2007 President Mwai Kibaki said the government would pave the road from Mochongoi to Marigat so farmers could get their produce to market more easily.
