= A11 road (Kenya) =

Road in Kenya

A11 Road

Route information
- Maintained by Kenya National Highways Authority

Major junctions
- North end: Lamu
- South end: Kiunga

Location
- Country: Kenya

Highway system
- Transport in Kenya

The A11 road is a road in Kenya situated in the easternmost part of the country. Spanning a distance of 107 kilometers, this route connects Lamu to Kiunga, a location near the international border with Somalia. Currently, the A11 exists as an unpaved dirt road, traversing a remote and potentially challenging terrain. Despite its rugged nature, this road plays a crucial role in linking these far-flung regions and facilitating movement within the area.

== Route ==
The A11 is a rudimentary sandy path that traverses the coastal plain, stretching from its intersection with the A10 north of Lamu to the small coastal town of Kiunga. Located over 10 kilometers from the Somali border, Kiunga serves as the terminus of the A11. Notably, from Kiunga, informal tracks continue across the beach, providing a crossing point into Somalia. This primitive route highlights the region's remote and understated connectivity, with the A11 playing a vital role in linking these coastal communities.

== History ==
The A11 designation was introduced in 2016, likely in anticipation of the proposed deep-sea port construction in Lamu. The assignment of this number suggests ambitions to establish a connected route to Somalia, with the A11 envisioned as a key branch road. However, as of now, the A11 remains a basic dirt road, far from the envisioned standard. Despite its current simplicity, the A11 holds potential as a strategic link in the regional transportation network, pending future development and upgrades.
