= Chesowanja =

Quaternary archaeological site in Kenya

Map of Kenya

Chesowanja is a Kenyan archaeological site located in the north of the Kenya Rift Valley, east of Lake Baringo. The Chesowanja sites consist of quaternary sediments. The sites are home to various discoveries like fossils, evidence of human activity over a period of 2 million years and the remains of Australopithecus. Also, artefacts belonging to Oldowan technology, Acheulean tradition and later stone industries have been found.

== History ==
Chesowanja was investigated first by the geologist John Carney. This investigation was part of a programme of regional mapping executed by the East African Geological Research Unit. Carney recovered fossil vertebrates from the Chemoigut Formation. A following faunal survey conducted by Andrew Hill unveiled a partial cranium of Australopithecus. In 1973, William Bishop, Andrew Hill, and Martin Pickford analysed the geological situation of Chesowanja. Extensive sequences of artifact horizons, and more hominid material was discovered.

== Geology and succession ==
=== Miocene rocks ===
Miocene rocks are the oldest surface rocks, consisting of basalts and phonolites. They are found in the east and west areas of Chesowanja. Besides diatoms and silicified wood, the phonolites consist of little fossils. The phonolites are believed to date between 10.7 mya and 13.5 mya. Phonolite cobbles found in the area were favoured as raw material for artifact production.

=== Phonolite and ankaramatic basalt ===
Besides phonolites, the deeply weathered ankaramatic basalt is part of the oldest exposed rocks in the region. This type of basalt is found extensively to the north (GR 8870, GR 8975). A relation between the phonolites and basalt is not observed anywhere. However, the basalt is thought to be younger than the phonolites. In certain parts of the area the ankaramatic basalt lays under three different layers - the Erinei trachyte, the Chemoigut Formation, and the Chesowanja Formation.

=== Erinei trachyte ===
The Erinei trachyte is found in the south of the extensive region, and is the first layer covering the ankaramatic basalt in streambeds at GR 8770.

=== Chemoigut Formation ===
The Chemoigut Formation consists of layers of silts and clays with horizons consisting of unrefined tuffaceous and pumiceous sandstone and fine conglomerates. The formation is exposed in three windows ruptured crest of the Chesowanja anticline. This anticline runs from north to south and the windows get numbered from one to three. In the north the thickness of the layer is estimated to be around 50 m (160 ft). To the south, only 25 to 30 m (82 to 98 ft) are exposed. In the Chemoigut Formation stone artefacts are found, providing the oldest local evidence for hominid activity. Also fossil bones, and the australopithecine partial cranium have been found in the formation.

The relationship between the Chemoigut Formation and Erinei trachyte is unknown. It seems like the sediments represent largely shallow water conditions recording the gradual burial of the landscape.

=== Chesowanja Formation ===
On top of the Chemoigut Formation lies the Chesowanja Formation. The formation consists of two basalt flows. On the surface of the second flow a palaeosol developed to the east of the Chesowanja anticline. In the upperpart of this palaeosol Acheulian artefacts have been discovered.

=== Karau Formation ===
The Karau Formation, laying on top of the Chesowanja Formation, consists of basalt, consisting of two units of trachytic tuffs. The tuffs found to the east of the anticline are fine-grained and contain plant impressions. These tuffs are the result of lacustrine deposition, either by falling into the lake or being transported through water. To the west, the tuffs have been formed by airfall. The two tuffs are useful to relatively date the Acheulean artefact assemblages found on the palaeosol surface underneath.

=== Pisolitic ferruginous calcrete ===
On the Karau Formation to the east, a layer of pisolitic ferruginous calcrete is present. This layer has a very similar consistency as the weathering profile on the surface of the Chesowanja basalt. Just like on this Chesowanja surface, the calcrete layer contains Acheulean or similar artifacts.

=== Mukutan Beds ===
Approximately 1 km east of the Chesowanja anticline the Mukutan Beds are exposed. They are stretched out along the Losokweta River and abandoned arms of the Mukutan River. In the upper reaches of the Losokweta, the basalt consists of a phonolite conglomerate, with tuffs and red silts. Artefacts and fossils are occasionally found in these deposits.

=== Alluvium ===
The youngest rocks in the Chesowanja area are alluvial and colluvial deposits. To the east, the alluvium consists of floodplain silts of the Mukatan River. During sheet floods, the silts are still actively transported. The layer is maximum 2 m thick.

== Paleontology ==
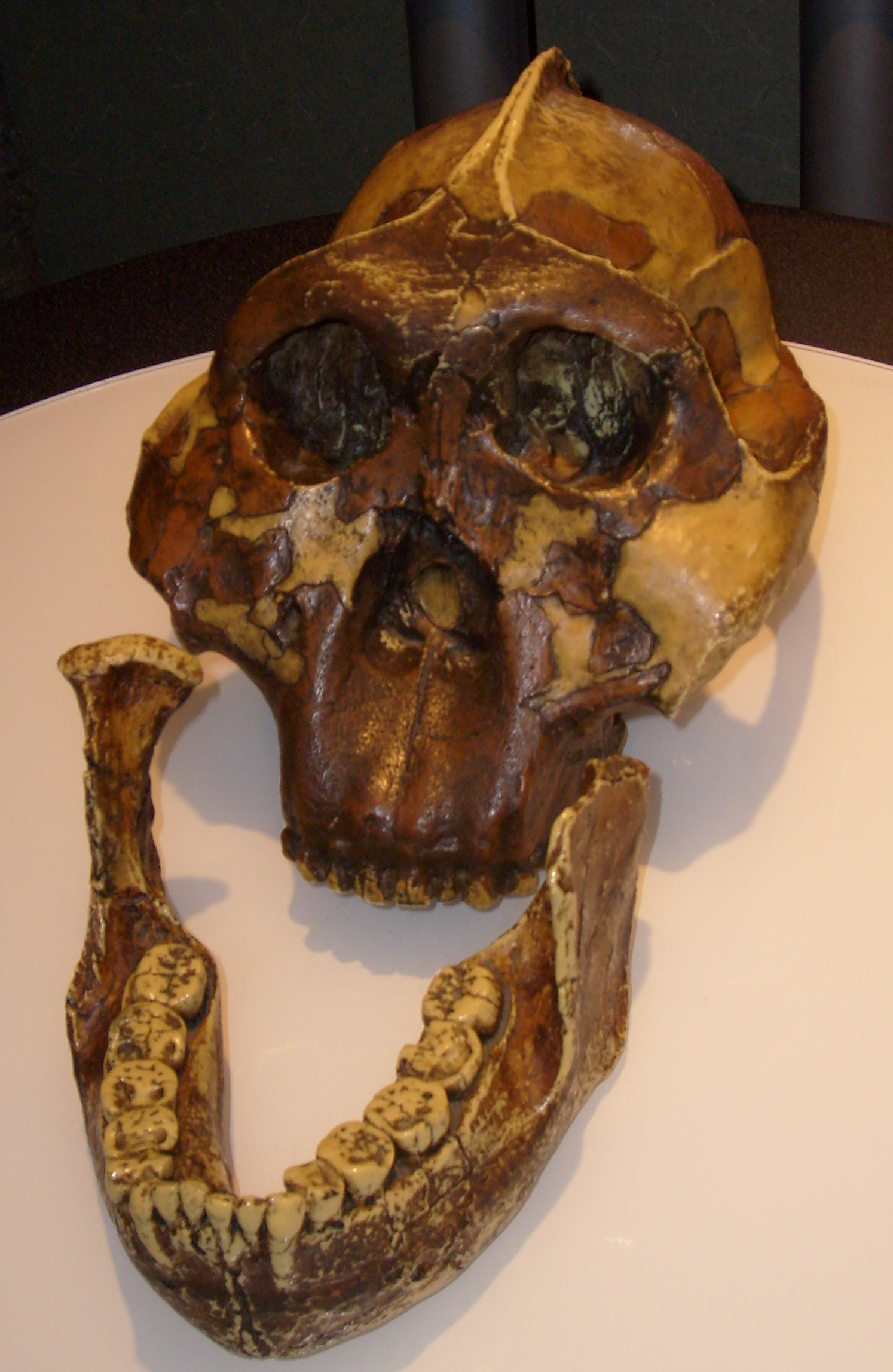
Paranthropus boisei discovered by Mary Leakey

The only layer rich in fossils is the Chemoigut Formation. Artefacts on the surface of the Chesowanja Formation and in the Mukutan Beds can be brought in association with some fauna. The australopithecine cranium (KNM-CH-1) found shows similarities with the Australopithecus robustus (Broom) and Australopithecus boisei (Leakey). Bishop et al. also discovered teeth fragments of another australopithecine individual (KNM-CH-302). Radiometric dating places the faunal evidence found in the Chemoigut Formation between 1.93 mya and 1.34 mya. This is in line with the Olduvai chronology.

The modern environment and its proxies show the link with bushed grassland habitats, with riverine and lacustrine components.

== Archaeological industries ==
Archaeological materials in Chesowanja are found in at least eight horizons within the geological succession. Harris and Bishop separate the materials found into three main categories. Tools from the Developed Oldowan industry have been found in the Chemoigut Formation. The surface of the Chesowanja Formation is known for its Acheulian industry. And lastly, the Mukutan Beds were home to later stone industry tools, obsidian tools, and pottery.

=== Chemoigut Formation industry ===
Artifacts in the Chemoigut Formation are rich in quantity and are found in five levels of the formation. Layers one and five (A1-A5) held remains of the Australopithecus. This Australopithecine cranium is dented by a lateral pressure and the palate was pushed inferiorly and anteriorly, creating an opening in the maxillary region. The cranium belonged to a large brained robust Australopithecine. In total the surface comprised 220 specimens from four main localities. All these specimens belong to a single cultural complex, the Oldowan/Developed Oldowan. The toolkit consists of choppers, side, end, and two-edged forms. The splintered ends of the stone tools indicate utilization. Also, two large symmetrical discoid/core tools with bifacially worked edges and a biconvex cross section have been found. This feature is atypical to the Oldowan/Developed Oldowan industry. There are also polyhedrons, discoids, light-duty scrapers made on flakes, and protobifaces found in the Chemoigut Formation. Real bifaces are absent. According to Bishop this industry probably dates back to 1.93 mya to 1.34 mya. Later Potassium-Argon dating of the basalt reported an age of 1.42 +/- 0.07 mya for the Australopithecus remains and the associated Oldowan tool technology.

=== Chesowanja Formation industry ===
The surface of the weathering profile developed on the upper basalt layer of the Chesowanja Formation shows evidence of the Acheulian industry. A collection of hand axes display a large range in size and shape, a high degree of fine-motoric skills, and are finished with fine flaking. Some hand axes are symmetrical and flaked to a sharp edge around the entire stone tool outline. Also cleavers, bifacially flaked choppers, pebble cortex, and scrapers have been found. The Chesowanja collection resembled the Late Auchelian assemblages to the west of Lake Baringo (Leakey 1969). The estimated date for these sites is 0.23 mya, though it could be later. Another surface collection of Acheulian tools came to light with the weathering of the later ‘Pisolitic ferruginous calcrete’. This assemblage also includes Levallois cores.

=== Mukutan Beds industry ===
A later stone tool industry is found in the former flood plain of the Mukutan. Places probably used as factory sites hold large mounds of artefacts. These artefacts consist of heavy duty core tools, including double ended picks and flakes. These stone tools are made of water cobbles and phonolites. Besides stone tools, pottery is present in the Mukutan Beds. No good estimates of age have been made for this region.

== Fire ==
Burnt clay found at one of the artefact localities dated to at least 1.42 +/- 0.07 mya. This is the earliest known evidence of fire associated with a hominid occupation site. The find strengthens the hypothesis that humans were controlling and using fire by 1.42mya. Glynn Isaac, however, doesn’t exclude the possibility of this evidence just being caused by natural causes, like a bush fire. He claims that we still don’t know whether humans used fire earlier than 0.5 mya. Gowlett, Harris and Wood replied that the clay was burned. The association of the fire with artefacts is thus direct and physical. The relatively low temperature for the baking of the clay forms more evidence for the nature of the fire.
