= Kapchepkor =

- Location within Kenya
- Coordinates: 0.62°N 35.8°E
- Country: Kenya
- County: Baringo County
- Time zone: UTC+3 (EAT)
- Climate: Cfb

Kapchepkor is a settlement in Kenya's Baringo County.
