= Kolloa =

- Location within Kenya
- Coordinates: 1°N 35.73°E
- Country: Kenya
- County: Baringo County
- Time zone: UTC+3 (EAT)

Kolloa is a settlement in Kenya's Baringo County.
