= Kapturwo =

Keturwo
- Location within Kenya
- Coordinates: 0.63°N 35.67°E
- Country: Kenya
- County: Baringo County
- Time zone: UTC+3 (EAT)
- Climate: Aw

Keturwo is a settlement in Kenya's Baringo County.
