= Bartolimo =

- Location within Kenya
- Coordinates: 0.68°N 35.82°E
- Country: Kenya
- County: Baringo County

Population (2019)
  - Total: 3,879
  - Density: 405/km^{2} (1,050/sq mi)
- Time zone: UTC+3 (EAT)
- Climate: Cfb

Bartolimo is a settlement in Kenya's Baringo County.
