= Nyalilpuch =

- Location within Kenya
- Coordinates: 0.23°N 36.15°E
- Country: Kenya
- County: Baringo County
- Time zone: UTC+3 (EAT)

Nyalilpuch is a settlement in Kenya's Baringo County.
