= Kinyang =

Settlement in Baringo County, Kenya

- Country: Kenya
- County: Baringo County
- Time zone: UTC+3 (EAT)

Kinyang is a settlement in Kenya's Baringo County.
