= Cheberen =

- Location within Kenya
- Coordinates: 0.23°N 35.83°E
- Country: Kenya
- County: Baringo County

Population (2019)
  - Total: 4,018
  - Density: 66/km^{2} (170/sq mi)
- Time zone: UTC+3 (EAT)
- Climate: Aw

Cheberen is a settlement in Kenya's Baringo County.
