= Bishop Gatimu Ngandu Girls High School =

Girls' school in Karatina, Kenya

Information
- Former name: Ngandu Girls' High School
- Motto: Empowering to Serve
- Established: 1964; 62 years ago
- Principal: Ms. Jane Kimiti
- Gender: Girls

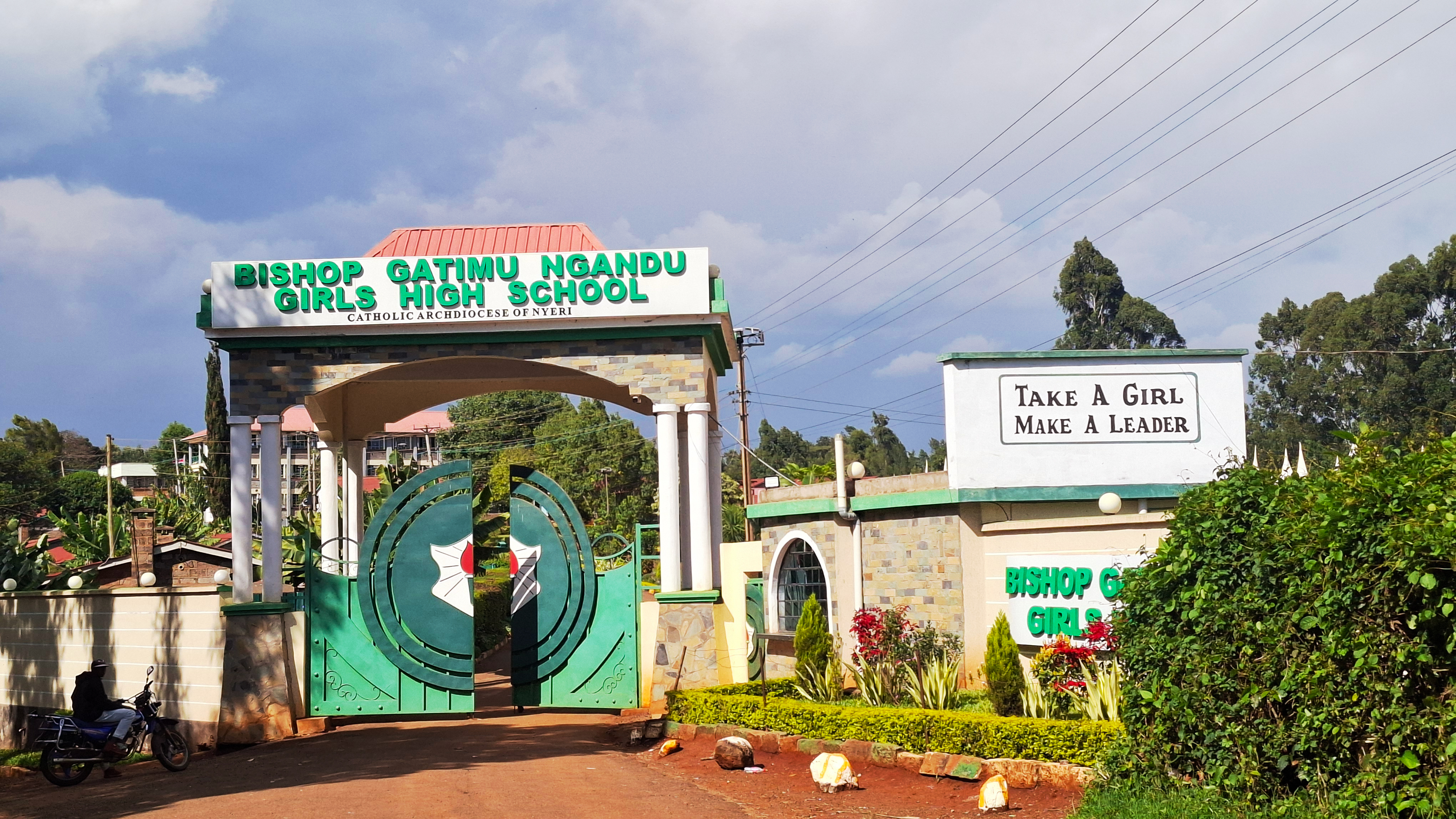
Bishop Gatimu Girls High School in Nyeri County, Kenya

Bishop Gatimu Ngandu Girls High School, popularly known as BG or BeeGee, was founded in 1960 by the late Bishop Caesar Gatimu in Ngandu area of Mathira Constituency in Nyeri County, Kenya. It was first named "Ngandu Girls' High School" from the area where it was situated. The name was later changed to honour its founder, The Right Reverend Caesar Gatimu. It was originally run by the Comboni mission.

Sister Sr Alexandrina was the first Principal then Sister Nazarena Zonta and her deputy, Sister Lucilla. Sbicego ran the school until 1983. Lay headmistresses, now principals in the employment of the Teachers Service Commission have headed the school since. The First Native principal was Miss Helen Wathuti Waweru - Hsc who served as principal from 1983-2006.

The principal is Ms. Jane Kimiti from June 2023.

The school motto is "Empowering to Serve".

== Notable alumni ==
- Cecilia "Amani" Wairimu, musician
- Susan Kihika, lawyer and politician
- Grace Kiptui, politician
- Grace Mumbi Ngugi, judge in the High Court of Kenya
- Mary Wangari Wamae, a lawyer, businesswoman and corporate executive
- Mercy Wanjau, Lawyer, Cabinet Secretary 2022- and formerly Ag. Director- General, Communications Authority of Kenya (CA).

== See also ==
- Education in Kenya
- List of schools in Kenya
