= Nosuguro =

Noosukuro
- Location within Kenya
- Coordinates: 0.58°N 36.13°E
- Country: Kenya
- County: Baringo County
- Time zone: UTC+3 (EAT)

Nosuguro is a settlement in Kenya's Baringo County.
