= Kapkiam =

- Location within Kenya
- Coordinates: 0.67°N 35.77°E
- Country: Kenya
- County: Baringo County
- Time zone: UTC+3 (EAT)
- Climate: Aw

Kapkiam is a settlement in Baringo County, Kenya.
