= Noiwe =

- Location within Kenya
- Coordinates: 0.07°N 35.93°E
- Country: Kenya
- County: Baringo County
- Time zone: UTC+3 (EAT)

Noiwe is a settlement in Kenya's Baringo County.
