= Kimngorom =

- Country: Kenya
- County: Baringo County
- Time zone: UTC+3 (EAT)
- Climate: Aw

Kimngorom is a settlement in Kenya's Baringo County.
