= Kinyach =

- Country: Kenya
- County: Baringo County
- Time zone: UTC+3 (EAT)

Kinyach is a settlement in Kenya's Baringo County.

== See also ==
- Lake Bogoria National Reserve
