= Emining =

- Location within Kenya
- Coordinates: 0.15°N 35.88°E
- Country: Kenya
- County: Baringo County

Population (2019)
  - Total: 5,572
- Time zone: UTC+3 (EAT)
- Climate: Aw

Emining is a settlement in Kenya's Baringo County.
