= Saint-Estève-Janson =

Commune in Provence-Alpes-Côte d'Azur, France

- Commune
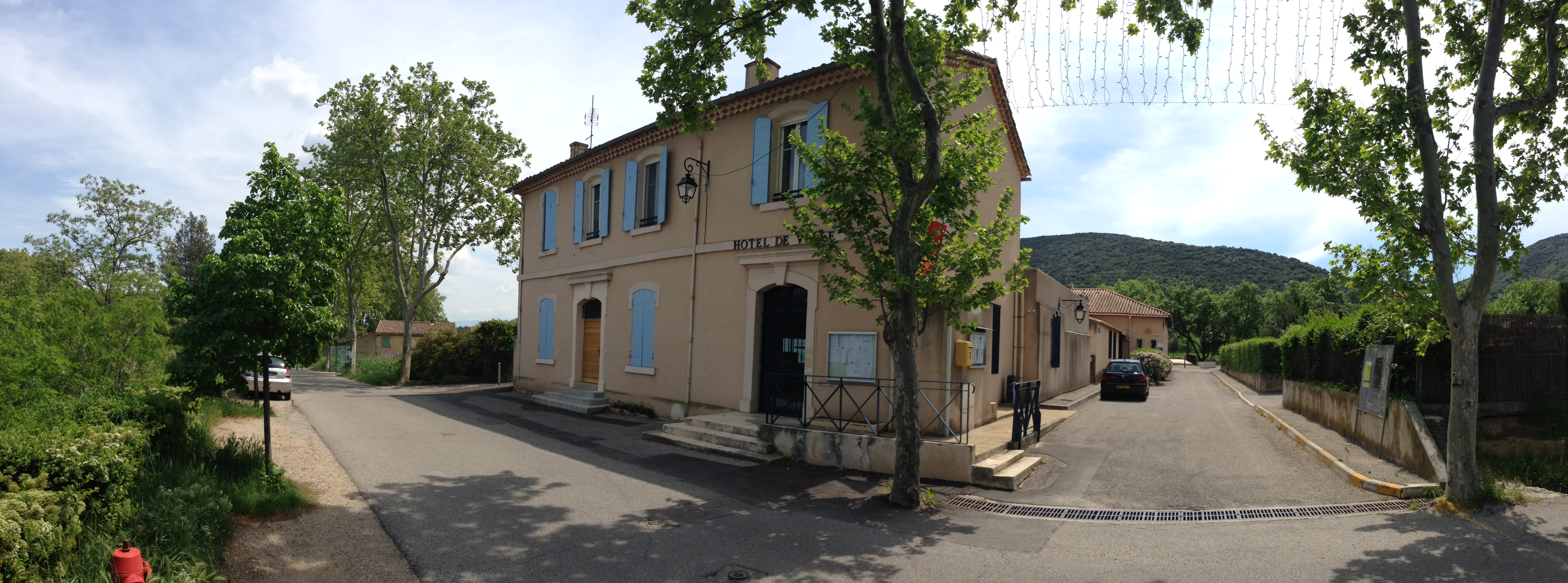
- The town hall of Saint-Estève-Janson

- Coat of arms
- Location of Saint-Estève-Janson
- Location within France Location within Provence-Alpes-Côte d'Azur
- Coordinates: 43°41′14″N 5°23′42″E
- Country: France
- Region: Provence-Alpes-Côte d'Azur
- Department: Bouches-du-Rhône
- Arrondissement: Aix-en-Provence
- Canton: Pélissanne
- Intercommunality: Aix-Marseille-Provence

Government
  - Mayor (2026–32): Sophie Jardinot
- Area^{1}: 8.65 km^{2} (3.34 sq mi)
- Elevation: 192 m (630 ft)
- Highest elevation: 415 m (1,362 ft)
- Lowest elevation: 154 m (505 ft)
- Population (2023): 357
  - Density: 41.3/km^{2} (107/sq mi)
- Time zone: UTC+01:00 (CET)
  - Summer (DST): UTC+02:00 (CEST)
- INSEE/Postal code: 13093 /13610
- ^{1} French Land Register data, which excludes lakes, ponds, glaciers > 1 km^{2} (0.386 sq mi or 247 acres) and river estuaries.

Saint-Estève-Janson is a commune in the Bouches-du-Rhône department in southern France.

There is evidence of five hearths and reddened earth in the Escale Cave. These hearths have been dated to 200,000 BP.

== Population ==
Historical population
Year	Pop.	±% p.a.
1968	117	—
1975	130	+1.52%
1982	202	+6.50%
1990	234	+1.86%
1999	302	+2.88%
2007	342	+1.57%
2012	359	+0.97%
2017	381	+1.20%
2023	357	−1.08%
Source: INSEE

== See also ==
- Communes of the Bouches-du-Rhône department
