= Kasisit =

- Location within Kenya
- Coordinates: 0.63°N 35.83°E
- Country: Kenya
- County: Baringo County
- Time zone: UTC+3 (EAT)
- Climate: Cfb

Kasisit is a settlement in Kenya's Baringo County.It is majorly inhabited by Tugen people a subtribe of Kalenjins.It is located on the Hills of KABARTONJO Division.
