= Loiminange =

- Location within Kenya
- Coordinates: 0.53°N 36.1°E
- Country: Kenya
- County: Baringo County
- Time zone: UTC+3 (EAT)

Loiminange is a settlement in Kenya's Baringo County.
