= Joseph Makilap =

Kenyan politician

Joseph Kipkoross Makilap MP

Member of Parliament for Baringo North
- Incumbent
- Assumed office 9 August 2022
- Preceded by: William Kipkorir

Personal details
- Party: United Democratic Alliance
- Website: Parliamentary website

Joseph Kipkoross Makilap is a Kenyan politician who is currently a member of the National Assembly for the Baringo North constituency, representing the Peoples Democratic Party.

== Biography ==
Makilap was educated at Bartabwa Primary School, graduating in 1989, then graduated from Sacho High School in 1993. He then graduated from Kagumo Teachers Training College in 2000, then earned a Bachelor of Education in Double Mathematics from the Catholic University of Eastern Africa. He then began to work as a teacher under the TSC, and also as a KNUT representative in Baringo. He worked in Baringo County government from 2013 to his election to the National Assembly in 2022. As of November 2025, he has not yet sponsored a bill in Parliament. He has argued that majority governments should consider post-election changes in composition, such as MPs changing political parties.
