= Chepkesin =

- Location within Kenya
- Coordinates: 0.88°N 35.88°E
- Country: Kenya
- County: Baringo County
- Time zone: UTC+3 (EAT)
- Climate: BSh

Chepkesin is a settlement in Kenya's Baringo County.
