= Bartabwa =

- Location within Kenya
- Coordinates: 0.83°N 35.8°E
- Country: Kenya
- CountyBaringo: Baringo County

Population (2019)
  - Total: 14,611
  - Density: 474/km^{2} (1,230/sq mi)
- Time zone: UTC+3 (EAT)
- Climate: Aw

Bartabwa is a settlement in Kenya's Baringo County.
