= Kamarabuyon =

- Location within Kenya
- Coordinates: 0.48°N 36.18°E
- Country: Kenya
- County: Baringo County
- Time zone: UTC+3 (EAT)
- Climate: Aw

Kamarabuyon is a settlement in Kenya's Baringo County.
