= Tiaty Constituency =

Tiaty
- constituency
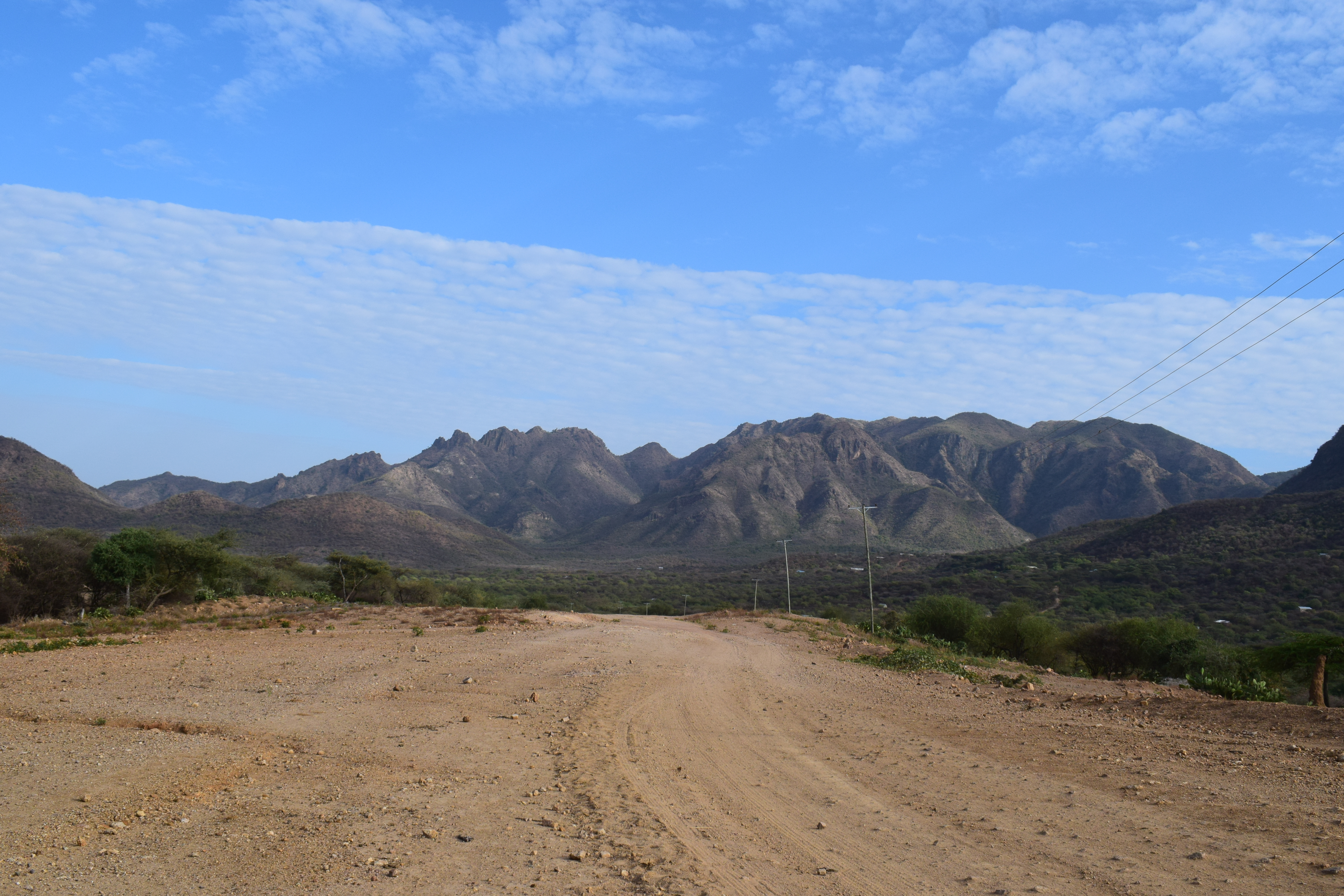
- Country: Kenya
- County: Baringo County

Tiaty is a constituency in Kenya. It is one of six constituencies in Baringo County.
