= Sorok =

Historical subdivision of Moscow, Russia

Sorok (Russian: cорóк) was a historical subdivision of Moscow in terms of parishes, used during 17-19th centuries. In the Russian language the word may be confused with "cóрок" (with the first syllable stressed), which means "forty".

By a decision of the Stoglavy Sobor of 1551, Moscow was subdivided into 6 soroks:

- Nikitsky Sorok, Никитский сорок
- Sretensky Sorok, Сретенский сорок (named after Sretenka)
- Prechistensky Sorok, Пречистенский сорок (after Prechistenka)
- Ivanovsky Sorok, Ивановский сорок
- Zamoskvoretsky Sorok, Замоскворецкий сорок (after Zamoskvorechye)
- Kitaisky Sorok, Китайский сорок (after Kitai-gorod)

On average, at these times each sorok encompassed 45 parochial churches.

The term gave rise to a Russian saying (recorded e.g., by Vladimir Dahl in his Sayings and Bywords of Russian People) "There are sorok sorokov of churches in Moscow" (meaning "multitudes of churches in Moscow"). It is sometimes mistakenly interpreted as 40 times 40, i.e., 1600 churches in Moscow, which is an exaggeration: in 1917 there were "only" 441 parochial churches and slightly over 200 home churches in Moscow.

At present, the Russian Orthodox realm is subdivided into eparchies, further subdivided into blagochiniyes (blagochinny okrugs, благочиние, благочинный округ).
