= Global Jurist of the Year Award =

Recognition awarded annually by the Center for International Human Rights

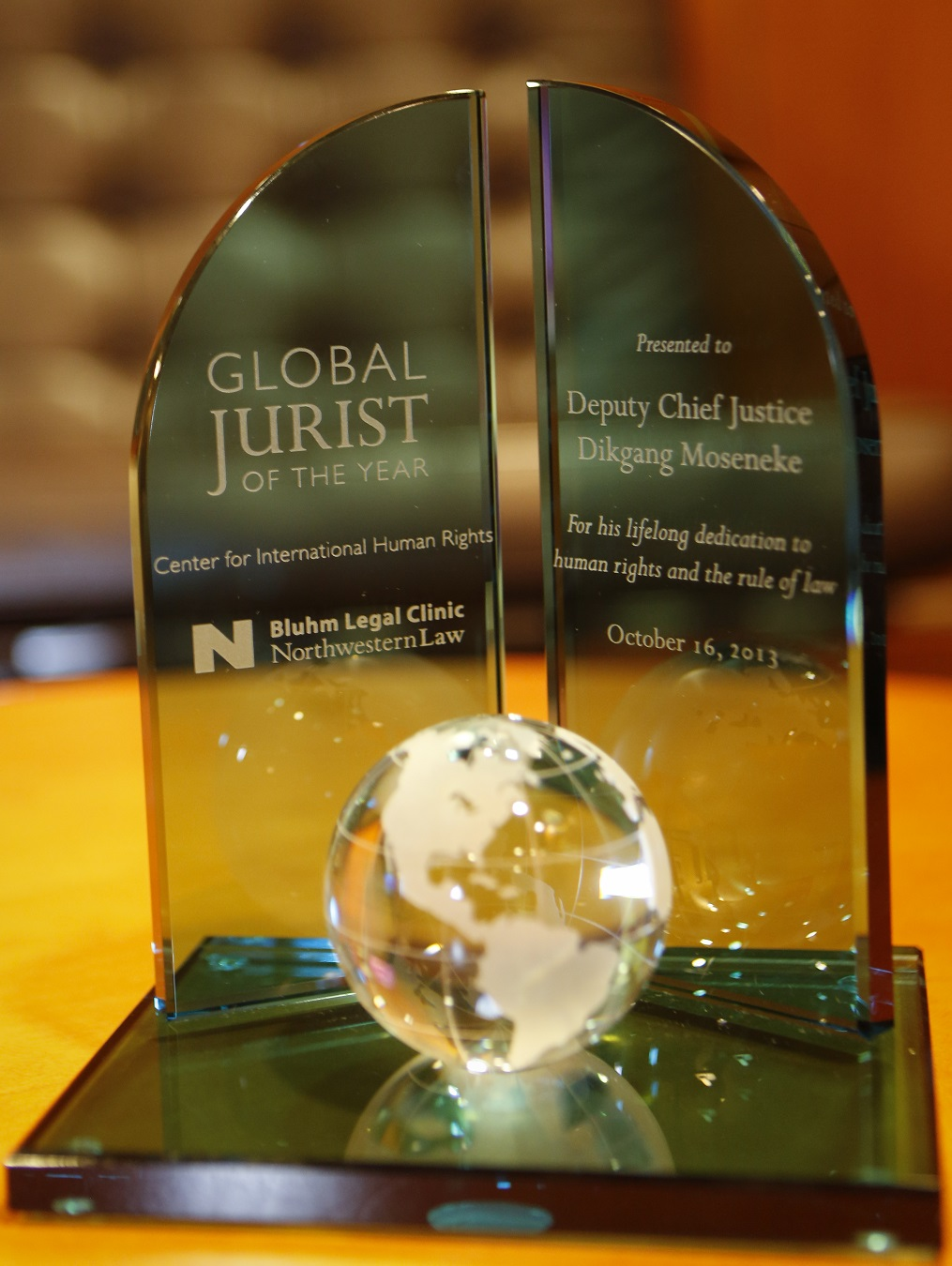
- Awarded for: Judicial contributions to human rights and international criminal law
- Location: Chicago, Illinois
- Presented by: Center for International Human Rights, Bluhm Legal Clinic at Northwestern University School of Law
- First award: 2013

The Global Jurist of the Year Award or the Global Jurist Award is an annual honor recognizing a sitting judge for advancing international human rights or criminal law. Presented by the Center for International Human Rights at Northwestern University School of Law, the award emphasizes judicial courage, rule of law, and dedication to justice under challenging conditions.

== Background ==
The Global Jurist of the Year Award was established in 2013 by the Center for International Human Rights (CIHR), which is housed in the Bluhm Legal Clinic at Northwestern University Pritzker School of Law. The award is granted annually to a sitting judge in recognition of that judge's contribution to the advancement of international human rights or international criminal law. Special account is given to jurists who demonstrate outstanding dedication to the rule of law and courage in the face of adversity, including personal risk. Jurists from all nations and tribunals are eligible.

The inaugural recipient of the award was Justice Dikgang Moseneke, Deputy Chief Justice of the Constitutional Court of South Africa.

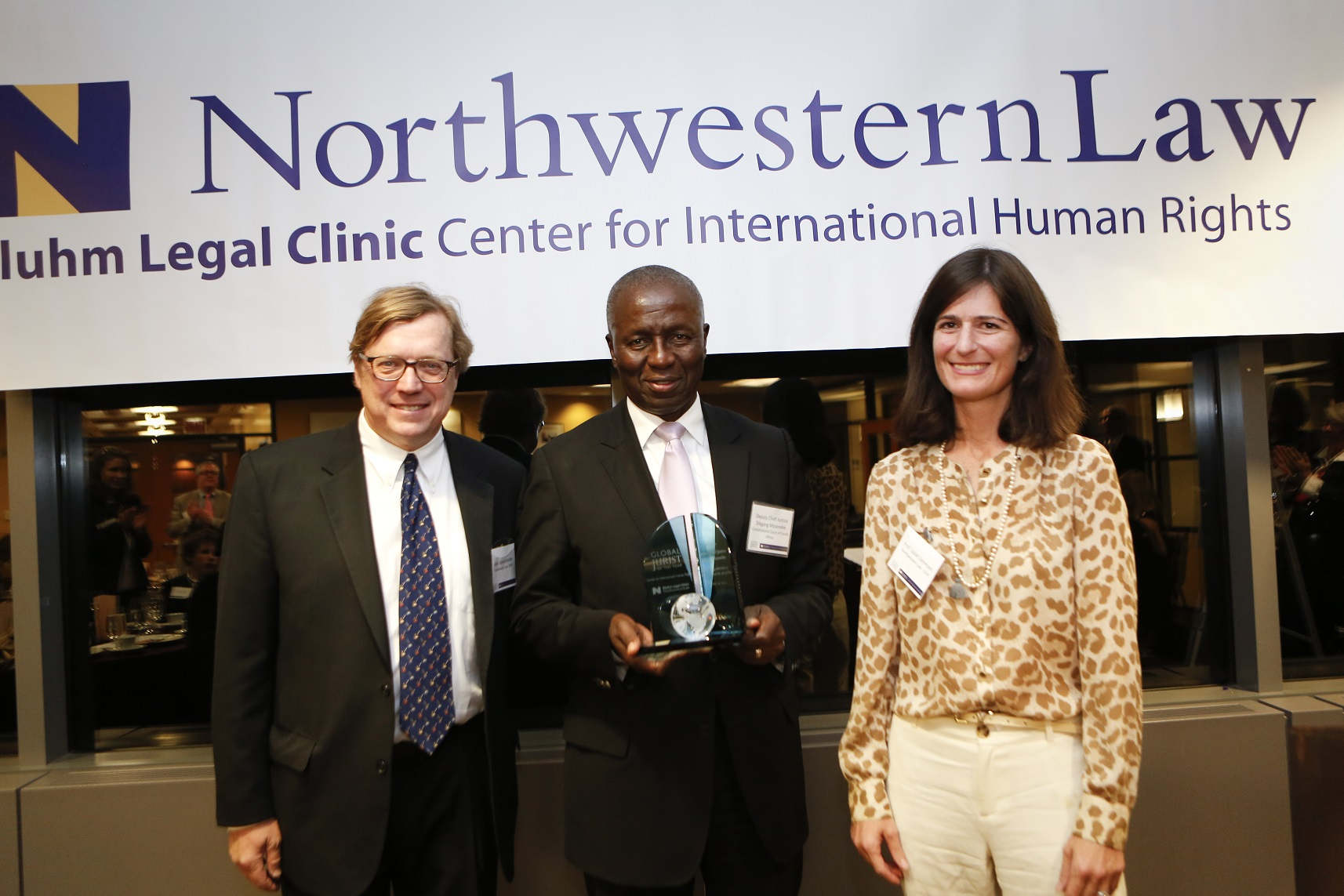
Dikgang Moseneke, Deputy Chief Justice of South Africa, receives the 2013 Global Jurist Award from Ambassador David Scheffer and Professor Juliet Sorensen, Center for International Human Rights, October 16, 2013

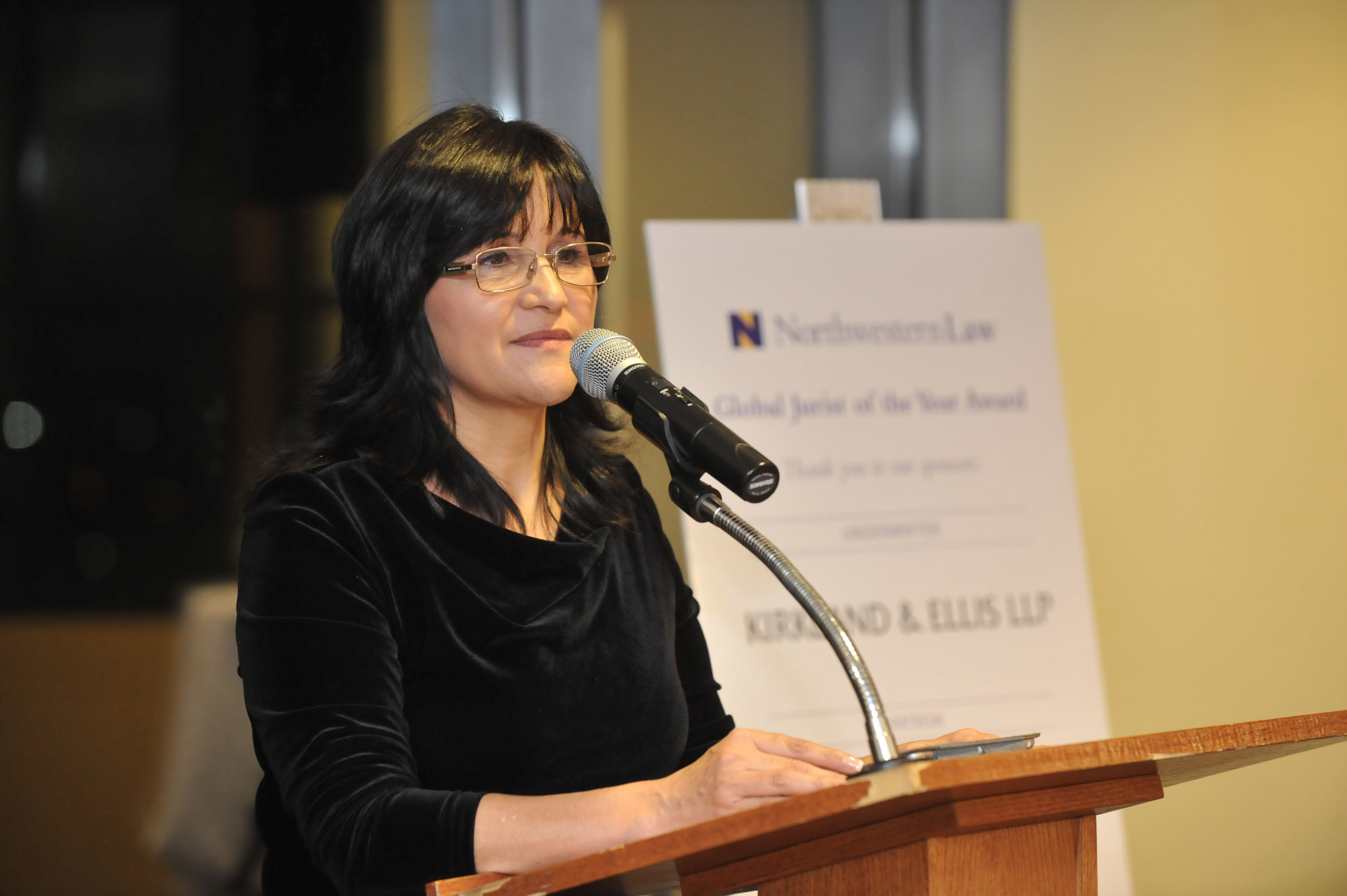
Gloria Patricia Porras Escobar, the President of the Constitutional Court of Guatemala, speaks at the 2015 Global Jurist Award Ceremony.

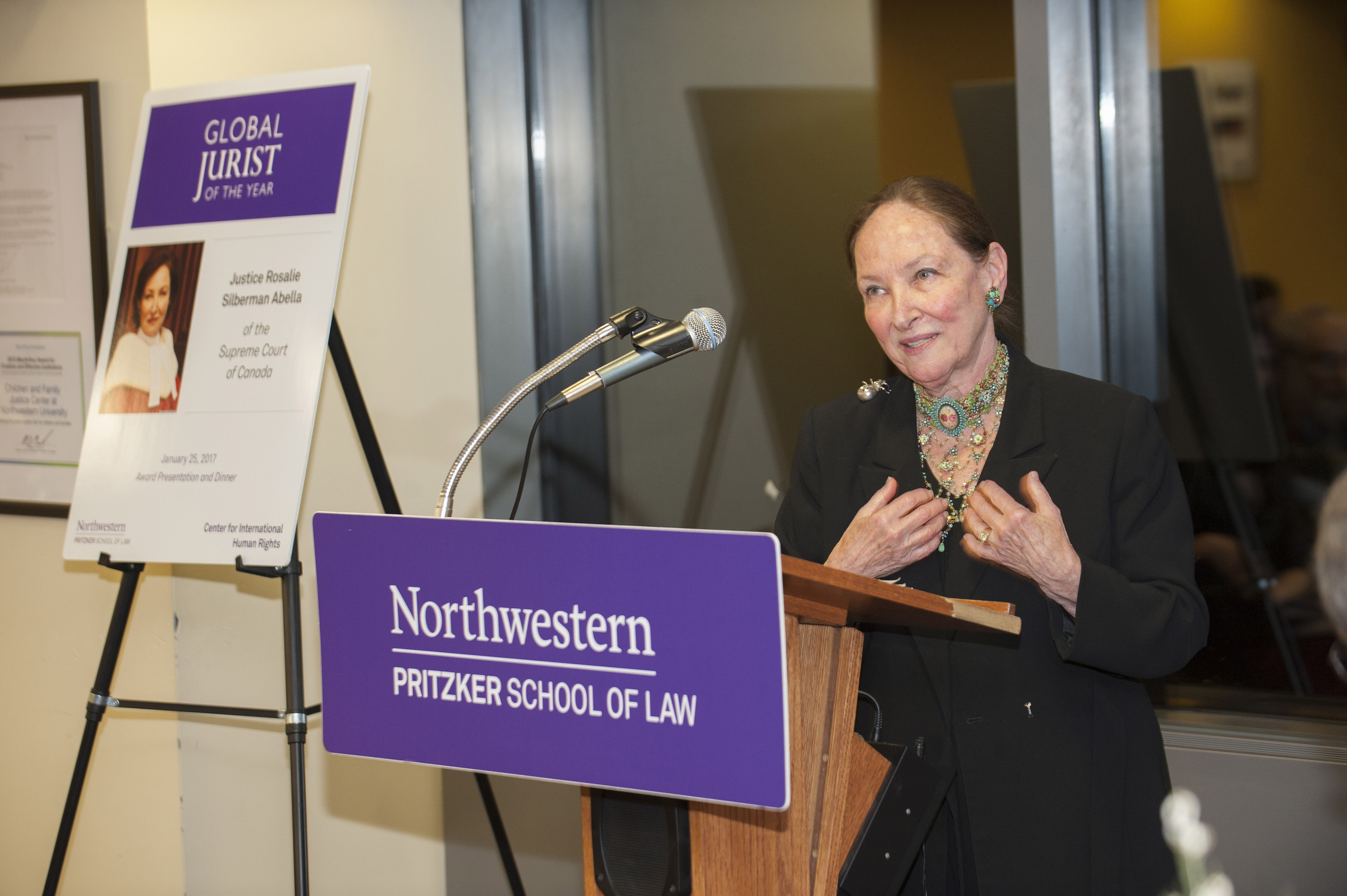
Justice Rosalie Silberman Abella of the Supreme Court of Canada speaks at the 2016 Global Jurist of the Year Award Ceremony

== Recipients ==
Year	Recipient	Judicial appointment at time of award	State/Organization
2013	Dikgang Moseneke	Deputy Chief Justice, Constitutional Court of South Africa	Republic of South Africa
2014	Shireen Avis Fisher	President, Special Court for Sierra Leone	The Special Court for Sierra Leone
2015	Gloria Patricia Porras Escobar	President, Constitutional Court of Guatemala	Guatemala
2016	Rosalie Silberman Abella	Justice, Supreme Court of Canada	Canada
2020	Mumbi Ngugi	Justice, High Court of Kenya	Kenya
2022	Miguel Ángel Gálvez	Judge	Guatemala
2023	Igor Tuleya	National Judge	Poland
2025	Belkis Florentina Izquierdo Torres	Auxiliary Judge, Superior Council of Judicature; President, Truth Recognition Chamber	Colombia
2026	Fernando Cruz Castro	Justice in the Constitutional Chamber of the Supreme Court of Costa Rica	Costa Rica
