= Chemoigut =

Mukutani
- Location within Kenya
- Coordinates: 0.68°N 36.2°E
- Country: Kenya
- County: Baringo County

Population (2019)
  - Total: 4,591
  - Density: 24/km^{2} (62/sq mi)
- Time zone: UTC+3 (EAT)
- Climate: Aw

Mukutani is a settlement in Kenya's Baringo County.
