= Kablukov =

Kablukov could refer to:

- Ilya Kablukov (born 1988), Russian ice hockey player
- Ivan Alexsevich Kablukov (1857–1942), Russian and Soviet physical chemist
