= Mukutan =

- Location within Kenya
- Coordinates: 0.63°N 36.27°E
- Country: Kenya
- County: Baringo County
- Time zone: UTC+3 (EAT)

Mukutan is a settlement in Kenya's Baringo County. A tourist cabin in Mukutan is featured in a Tripadvisor link.
