= Joshua Chepyegon Kandie =

Kenyan politician

Joshua Chepyegon Kandie is a Kenyan politician from the United Democratic Alliance (UDA), formerly from the Maendeleo Chap Chap Party. In the elections of 2017 and 2022, he was elected to the National Assembly in Baringo Central Constituency.

== See also ==
- 12th Parliament of Kenya
- 13th Parliament of Kenya
