= Benjamin Cheboi =

Kenyan politician (born 1958)

Benjamin Chesire Cheboi, EGH, EBS, is a Kenyan politician who was the first and current Governor of Baringo County. He belongs to the UDA party.

== Early life and education ==
Cheboi was born in 1958 in the then Baringo district. He was educated at Kabarnet Boys High School for both his O levels and Friends School, Kamusinga for his A levels. He then proceeded to University of Nairobi to pursue a Bachelor of Science Degree. He also holds a master's degree in Financing Higher Education from University of Manchester United Kingdom.

== Professional career ==
Governor Cheboi held the position of Ag. Academic Registrar, Jomo Kenyatta University of Agriculture and Technology. He thereafter worked as the Deputy Chief Executive Officer, Higher Education Loans Board before being promoted to serve as the CEO of the same institution. In addition he was the first president of the Association of African Higher Education Agencies (AAHEFA). He also served as Commissioner, Commission for Higher Education and Director at the Kenya Institute of Directors.

== Political career ==
Following the promulgation of the constitution of Kenya (in 2010), which entrenches devolution, there were calls from several quarters in Baringo County for Cheboi to vie for governorship. As required by law, Cheboi resigned from HELB in September 2013 to run for office.

He chose to vie on a URP ticket. In the party primaries of 17 January 2013, Cheboi trounced his sole opponent, Kiprono Chelugui in five out of Baringo County's six constituencies. In the 4 March Kenya general election Cheboi won the gubernatorial seat after beating four other candidates. He was sworn into office on 27 March 2013. His popularity and landslide victory is majorly credited with aligning with URP the popular tribal party amongst Kalenjins. He also had a healthy war chest to sustain campaigns as is the culture in Kenya.

In the April 2022 UDA Party nominations, he beat the incumbent Governor Stanley Kiptis where is making his comeback to the leadership of the county upon clinching the seat in August 2022. Also in the race was the Eldama Ravine MP Moses Lessonet who came in second in the primaries.

== Manifesto ==
In his campaigns, Cheboi promised to tackle cattle rustling, boost food security through initiation and rehabilitation of irrigation schemes and promote education in the county.

== Governorship ==
Upon assuming office, Governor Cheboi constituted his first County Executive Committee composed of the following for the respective dockets.

1. Wesley Keitany (Industrialization, Commerce Tourism and Enterprise Development)
2. Lilian Sadalla (Land, Housing and Urban Planning)
3. Edwin Riamangura (Youth, Gender, Labour and Social Services)
4. Job Kibei Tomno (Water and Irrigation)
5. Caroline Lentupuru (Environment and Natural Resources)
6. Andrew Kwonyike (Transport and Infrastructure)
7. Emily Kibet (Education)
8. Lukah Rotich ( Agriculture, Livestock and Fisheries)
9. Moses Atuko (Health)
10. Dr Stella Kereto-CS

Governor Cheboi and Senator Gideon Moi, though elected through different political parties have exhibited a close working relationship for the sake of development of Baringo County. Together with the County women representative, Grace Kiptui, they regularly hold consultative meetings. They have been in the fore-front in mitigating the effects of the 2014 drought as well as tackling the cattle rustling menace in the county.

== Awards ==
Governor Cheboi has won several awards including Presidential Award, Elder of the Burning Spear (EBS), Kenya Communication Technology Award, BEST executive support for ICT-2008 and World Bank Fellowship to study Master's in Education.
