= Marigat =

- Location within Kenya
- Coordinates: 0.47°N 35.98°E
- Country: Kenya
- County: Baringo County
- Time zone: UTC+3 (EAT)

Marigat is a small town in Baringo County, Kenya.

Marigat is a fast-growing town located in the lowlands of Baringo County which was named after the Tugen name for narrowing corners. Its growth is supported by the Perkerra irrigation scheme where onions, pepper, papaws and maize, among other crops, are grown. Marigat town is about 20 km from both the famous L. Baringo and L. Bogoria; this exposes the town to new a ideology through interaction between visitors and the locals. Marketing of local products such as honey (enaisho), goat's meat (nkirri), and cultural artifacts is made effective by the surging local and foreign tourists and travellers.

Tourists go for art such as braided callabush, the ilchamus club, ilchamus sheets and the tugen bow and arrows. Passengers buy onions, tomatoes, honey, water, melon, bananas, oranges from the Parkerra irrigation scheme as they wait for the bus at the Matatu stage to surprise their families.

Marigat is inhabited by the Tugen (Samor) mainly from the upper regions, i.e. south, southeast and southwest, the Ilchamus mainly from the low regions northwards and the western Pokot communities who are mainly pastoralists.
