= Sammy Mwaita =

Kenyan politician

Sammy Silas Komen Mwaita is a Kenyan politician. He is a member of the United Republican Party and a former MP in the National Assembly of Kenya.

== Professional career ==
Mwaita was a long-serving civil servant, rising from a junior officer to the position of Commissioner of Lands (2000-2003). As the Commissioner of lands, he was instrumental in the degazettment of in Mau forest land to pave way for the issuance of title deeds to Ogiek squatters.

== Political career ==
Mwaita was the MP for Baringo Central since December 2007. He was first elected in the 2007 Kenyan parliamentary election in December 2007, winning the seat and defeating the incumbent Gideon Moi (the son of former President Daniel arap Moi). He ran on an ODM ticket and managed to garner 26,603 votes compared to Moi's 7,527.
