= Arror people =

The Arrors or Northern Tugen are the inhabitants of the Tugen Hills stretching from the western shores of Lake Baringo on the East to the foot of the Keiyo escarpment along the Kerio Valley to the west, north of Baringo District, Rift Valley Province, Kenya. As of 2019 their population was 92,470.

Of the Kalenjin dialects, their speech is sharply accented and fast. They are able to easily understand all the other dialects of the Kalenjin, a feat which the others hardly accomplish. Due to this dynamism, their contribution to the Kalenjin lexicon is worth noting.
