= Baringo North Constituency =

Electoral district of Kenya

Baringo North
- constituency for the Parliament of Kenya
- Baringo North Constituency within Baringo County

- Baringo County within Kenya
- County: Baringo
- Population: 104,871
- Area: 1,629 km^{2} (629.0 sq mi)

Current constituency
- Number of members: 1
- Party: UDA
- Member of Parliament: Joseph Kipkoross Makilap
- Wards: 5

Baringo North Constituency is an electoral constituency in Kenya. It is one of six constituencies in Baringo County. The constituency was established for the 1963 elections. The constituency has ten wards, all electing councillors for the Baringo County Council.

Daniel arap Moi, who later became the Kenyan president, was the first Baringo North MP. In the 1966 elections, he switched to represent Baringo Central Constituency.

== Members of Parliament ==
Elections	MP	Party	Notes
1963	Daniel arap Moi	KADU	One-party system
1966	Henry Ronguno arap Cheboiwo	KANU	One-party system
1969	Henry Ronguno arap Cheboiwo	KANU	One-party system
1974	Henry Ronguno arap Cheboiwo	KANU	One-party system
1979	Zephaniah Kipkebut Chepkonga	KANU	One-party system
1980	Henry Ronguno arap Cheboiwo	KANU	By-election; one-party system
1983	Henry Ronguno arap Cheboiwo	KANU	One-party system
1988	Willy Rotich Y. arap Kamuren	KANU	One-party system
1992	Willy Rotich Y. arap Kamuren	KANU	One-party system
1997	Andrew C. Kiptoon	KANU	One-party system
2002	William Kiplumbei Boit	KANU	One-party system
2007	William Kipkiror	ODM	Multi-party system
2013	William Kipkiror	URP	Multi-party system
2017	William Kipkiror	JP	Multi-party system
2022	Joseph Kipkoross Makilap	UDA	Multi-party system

== locations ==
Wards
location	Registered Voters
Bartum	2,455
Kaboska i / Kipkata || 3,902
Kaboskei Kerio	1,835
Kabutiei	2,483
Katiorin / Saimo South	5,537
Kelyo / Ossen	6,407
Lawan	3,378
Ng'orora	25000
Saimo North	2,585
Sibilo	2,258
Total	33,494
*September 2005,
