= Tugen people =

Nilotic ethnic group in Kenya

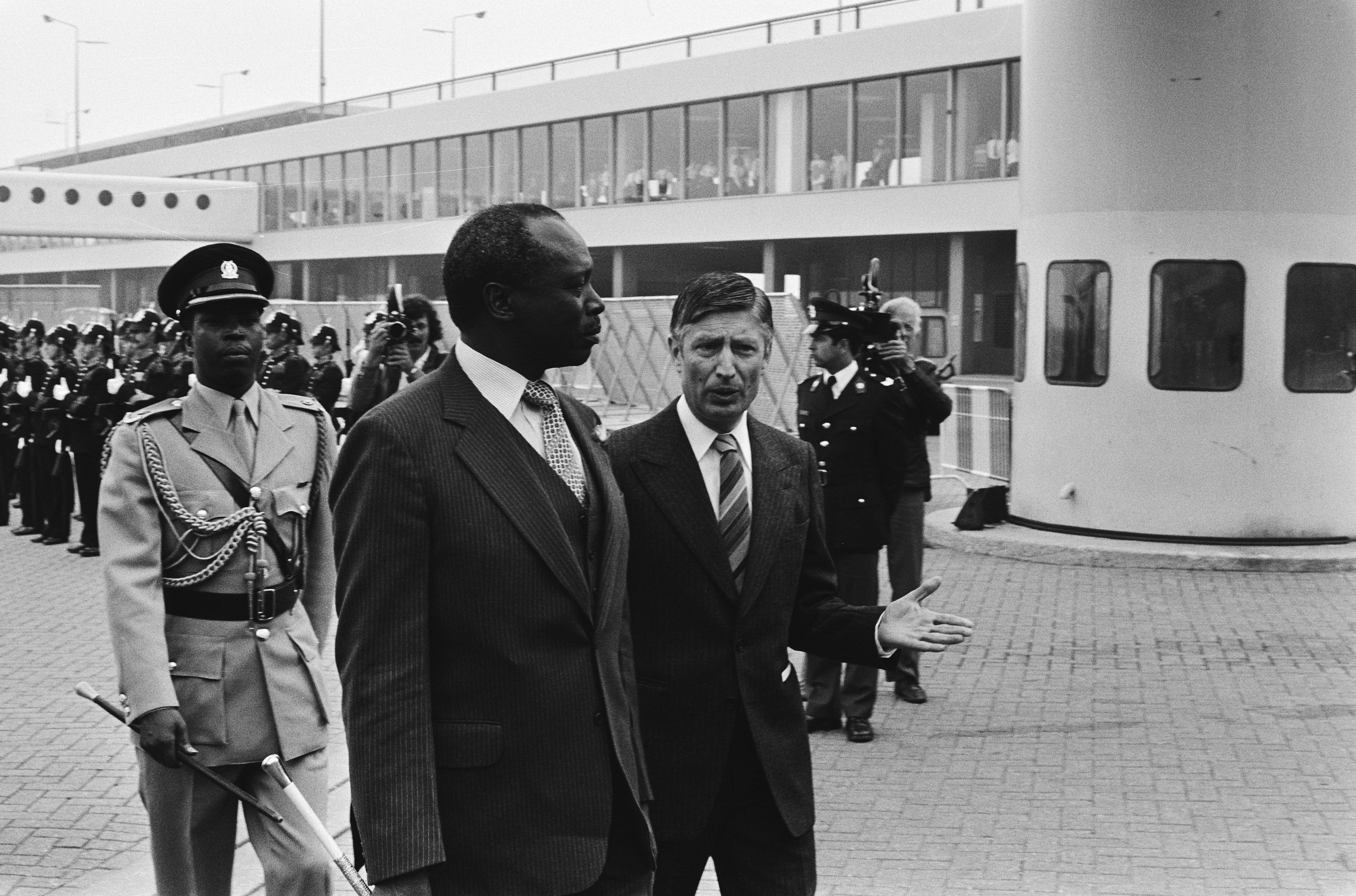
This photo is part of the Anefo photo collection from the Dutch National Archives and documents the state visit of the Kenyan President Daniel Moi of Tugen descent to the Netherlands in 1979.

The Tugen are a Southern Nilotic sub-tribe of the Kalenjin people, falling under the highland Nilotes category. They primarily occupy Baringo County and parts of Nakuru and Elgeyo Marakwet Counties in the former Rift Valley Province. The Tugen population was officially recorded as 197,556 in the 2019 Kenya Census. The community is further divided into distinct sections, including the Arror (North Baringo), Samor (Central Baringo), and the Endorois. Daniel arap Moi, the second & longest serving president of Kenya (1978–2002), was a prominent member of this sub-tribe. They speak the Tugen language, a member of the Kalenjin dialect cluster that is closely related to Kipsigis and Nandi.

== Culture ==
The Tugen culture is uniquely defined by its adaptation to the diverse landscapes of the Tugen Hills and the Kerio Valley, resulting in a dual identity of pastoralism and agriculture. It is more diverse in culture and language than other Kalenjin subtribes. It is divided into Arror, Torois and Samor. There is also small division of the tugens more specifically in mogotio region of pogoor and kebeen. Aror and Samor follow Tugen circumcision rites and Torois, kebeen and pogoor follows Nandi circumcision rights. Aror have a strong connection with Marakwet people while Samor, pogoor and kebeen have connections with Keiyo, Lembus and Nandi. Central to their social structure is the age-set system (asista), which traditionally governed rites of passage and community leadership. They are renowned for their oral literature and traditional music, often featuring the kimengeng (a six-stringed lyre), which plays a vital role in ceremonies and storytelling. The Tugen also maintain a deep spiritual and legal connection to their ancestral lands, most notably the Endorois community, who have gained international recognition for their landmark legal victory at the African Commission regarding land rights and the protection of the Lake Bogoria region. This culture remains a blend of deep-rooted Nilotic traditions and a modern political legacy shaped by their important role in Kenya's post-independence history.

== History ==
The oral traditions of the Tugen indicate three areas of origin located north, west and east of remaining Tugen homelands. The bulk of the population originated from the west, from Sumo, which is located between Mount Elgon and Cherangany Hills. The northern and eastern migrations came from Suguta (Lake Turkana) and Koilegen (Mount Kenya) and brought with them non-Kalenjin speaking people from northern Kenya and the highlands to the East of the Rift Valley, respectively. Folklore states that some Tugen are remnants of Masaai pastoralists.

== Demographics ==
The Tugen are subdivided into two subgroups known as Arror and Samor:

- Arror live in the Highlands of Kabartonjo and the lowlands of Kerio Valley (Barwessa) and Lake Baringo of North Baringo District.
- Samor who live in Kabarnet, Sacho, Ewalel, and Kapropita in Central Baringo district. This is the group from which the second president of Kenya, Daniel Toroitich Aarap Moi comes.

Initially Lembus and Torois were part of Samor.

- Lembus Who mostly live in Eldama Ravine constituency, Mogotio constituency, Nakuru constituency, Tenges ward and part of Keiyo
- Torois Who mostly live in Baringo South and Mogotio Constituencies, Baringo County.

== Culture ==
=== Religion ===
Traditionally, like other Kalenjin people, the Tugen prayed to Asis (symbolized by life giving force, the sun). Other attributes to Asis are Chepokipkoyo (God of harvest), Cheptengeryan (God of love), and Cheponamoni. Most have converted to Christianity. Islam flourished in major town. Traditional religion is almost completely wiped out with Christianity being widely practiced

=== Age-sets ===
Tugen social organisation centres on the age set, or ipindo. The seven age-sets (ipinwek) are rotational, meaning at the end of one age-set new members of that generation are born.

Some Kalenjin peoples, include an age-set called Maina. However, among the Tugen, this age-set is extinct. Legend has it that the members of this ipindo were wiped out by the purko and ilkisongo maa subtribes during the loikop civil war among the maa tribes, it is said that the maina ageset aided the ilaikipiak maasai subtribe but most maina were driven and drowned in now lake nakuru while others were driven downwards the menenagai escarpment where they met their fate, few survived to tell the tale. To avoid a recurrence, the community decided to retire the age-set.

Ipindo was given out at initiation. By simple arrangements, there ought to be one ipindo between father and son. For example, a korongoro cannot beget a kipkoimet. Tugen don't consider a woman to have an age-set, hence she can marry any age-set except her father's. The Tugen say ma tinyei ipin Korgo, meaning they can marry any age-set, but they have their own age-set such as chesiran, masinya, and chepigwek. Age-sets:

- Chumo
- Sawe
- Korongoro
- Kipkoimet
- Kaplelach
- Kipnyigei
- Nyongi

=== Age sub-set (siritie) ===
In each age-set, initiates are bundled into siritie or what can be understood as a 'team'. There are three siritoik in an age-set (ibindo) namely:

- Chongin
- kapchepsuei
- Barnot (youth)

Initiations

Tugens are very diversified in terms of the types of initiation ceremonies. Female circumcision was abolished decades ago. Male initiation would graduate a male from boyhood into warrior status called (muren). After the warriorhood stage there was a ceremony called kuletap eito where the senior warrior class would be graduated into elder class. The women then during the precolonial period would similarly undergo kuletap kweet ceremony to achieve elderly class.

Around 1930-1940s, the influx of nandi tradition and customs reached the tugenland, and most of the tugens especially from baringo south, mogotio, nakuru adopted the nandi initiation ways while the tugens from baringo central and north retained their old ways.

== Notables ==
- Daniel Arap Moi, second president of Kenya
- Gideon Moi
- Benjamin Chesire Cheboi, the first governor of Baringo County
- Paul Tergat world marathon champion
- Reuben Chesire - politician, businessman, farmer
