= Baringo County =

Coordinates: 0°40′N 36°00′E

- County
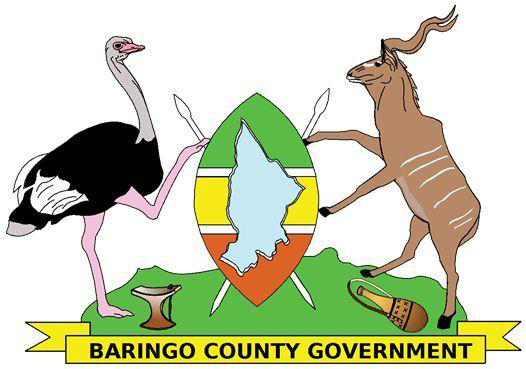
- Flag Coat of arms

- Location in Kenya
- Country: Kenya
- Formed: 4 March 2013
- Capital: Kabarnet

Government
  - Governor: Benjamin Cheboi

Area
  - Total: 11,075.3 km^{2} (4,276.2 sq mi)

Population (2019 census)
  - Total: 666,763
  - Density: 60.2027/km^{2} (155.924/sq mi)
- Time zone: UTC+3 (EAT)

Baringo County is one of the 47 counties in Kenya. It is located in the former Rift Valley Province. Its headquarters and largest town is Kabarnet. The county is home to Lake Baringo, Lake Bogoria and Lake Kamnarok.

== Geographical location ==
Baringo is bordered by Turkana County and West Pokot County to the North, Samburu County and Laikipia County to the East, Nakuru County and Kericho County to the South, Uasin Gishu County to the South West and Elgeyo Marakwet County to the West. It covers an area of 8,655 km^{2}. Baringo County lies between Latitudes 00 degrees 13" South and 1 degree 40" north and Longitudes 35 degrees 36" and 36" degrees 30" East.

== Administrative and political units ==
Baringo has seven administrative sub-counties

1. Baringo Central
2. Tiaty East
3. Tiaty West
4. Eldama Ravine
5. Baringo South
6. Mogotio
7. Baringo North
- Eldama Ravine and Mogotio sub counties combined was formerly Koibatek District*

=== Administrative and electoral units in Baringo County ===
Baringo county has a total of thirty electoral wards and one hundred and sixteen locations. The electoral wards is run by an elected Member of County Assembly(MCA) while a location is led by Chief appointed by the national government.

Constituency	Area KM sq	Electoral Wards	Locations
Baringo South	1,678	4	17
Mogotio	1,315	3	24
Eldama Ravine	1,003	6	16
Baringo Central	800	5	21
Baringo North	1,704	5	14
Tiaty	4,517	7	24
Total	11,015	30	116

== Demographics ==
The county has a population of 666,763 (2019 census) and an area of 10,976.4 km^{2} (4,238.0 sq mi).

Historical population
Year	Pop.	±%
1979	203,792	—
1989	347,990	+70.8%
1999	403,141	+15.8%
2009	555,561	+37.8%
2019	666,763	+20.0%

=== Distribution of population by sex and sub-county ===
	Subcounty	Male	Female	Intersex	Total
1	Baringo Central	48,120	48,829	2	96,951
2	Baringo North	52,369	52,500	2	104,871
3	East Pokot	40,462	39,459	2	79,923
4	Eldama Ravine	65,295	64,238	2	129,535
5	Baringo South	45,706	45,246	3	90,955
6	Mogotio	47,014	45,088	2	91,104
7	Tiaty East	38,356	35,068	-	73,424
	TOTAL	336,322	330,428	13	666,673

=== Religion ===
Religion in Baringo County

Religion (2019 Census)	Number
Catholicism	122,620
Protestant	291,992
Evangelical Churches	111,615
African instituted Churches	40,269
Orthodox	976
Other Christian	28,449
Islam	5,241
Hindu	90
Traditionists	23,589
Other	12,275
No ReligionAtheists	23,697
Don't Know	1,914
Not Stated	33

== Religion and ethnicities ==
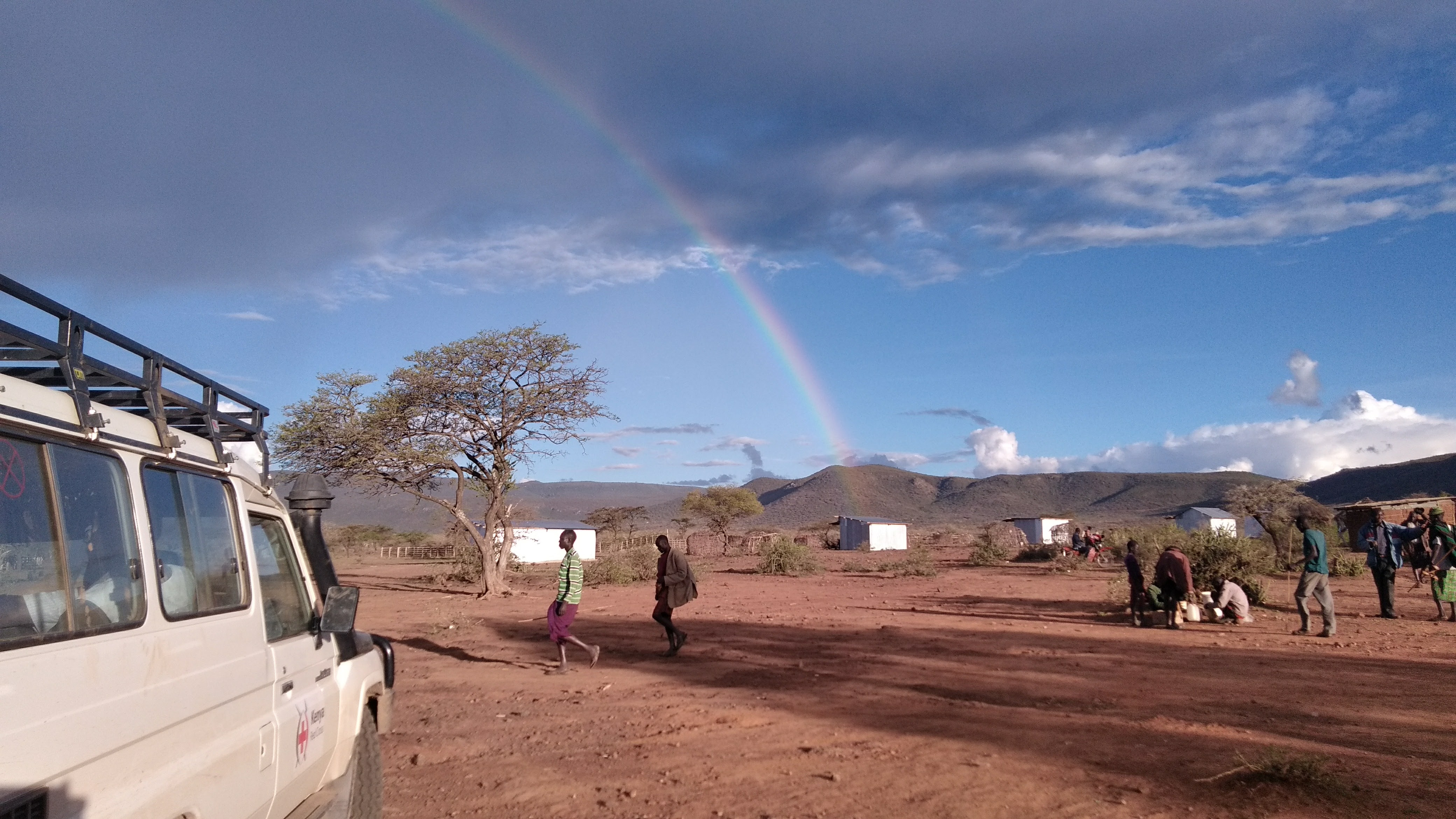
Red Cross team at work in East Pokot

The county is largely occupied by the Tugen, Lembus, Ndorois and Pokot people, which are Sub-Tribes of the Kalenjin people. The Tugen people include the Samor, Chapchap, and the Sachek of Sacho. Other communities residing in Baringo County include the Ilchamus, Turkana, Kikuyu, Numbians, and others. Christianity is the most practiced religion in the county. Traditionally, Baringo people believed in a Supreme Being known as Asis, who is represented by the sun; however, currently, most individuals in the county believe in Christianity. The well-known Christian denominations within Baringo County include the African Inland Church (AIC), Anglican Church of Kenya (ACK), FGCK and Roman Catholic.

== County government ==
The current county governor is Benjamin Chesire Cheboi, the deputy governor is Eng. Felix Kipng'ok who is the eldest son of the former deputy governor Charles Kipng'ok who collapsed and died on 14 September 2022, at Jomo Kenyatta International Airport while boarding a plane to Mombasa; barely a month after taking oath of office. The current Senator is William Kipkorir Cheptumo after overwhelmingly defeating the former senator Gideon Moi on the 9 August polls. The current County Women Representative is Flowrence Jematiah Sergon. The County Executive Committee consists of the following:

CEC Member	Docket
Mrs. Scola Jepkesei Kimeli	Devolution, Public Service Management and Administration, e-government and ICT
Mr. Richard K Rotich	Health Services & Ag. CEC Land, Housing and Urban Development
Ms. Mary Chebet Panga	Environment, Natural Resources, Tourism and Wildlife Management
Dr. Maureen Jemutai Rotich	Water and Irrigation & Ag. CEC Agriculture, Livestock Development and Fisheries
Mr. Elijah Kiprop Kipkoros	Environment and Natural Resources
Mr. Enock Keston	Transport, Public Works and Infrastructure & Ag. County Secretary
Mr. David Sergon Chesire	Education, Sports, Youth, Gender Affairs, Culture and Social Services & Ag. CEC Industry, Commerce, Enterprise and Co-orperative Development

== Economics ==
The economy of the county is mainly agro-based. The main food crops grown are maize, pigeon peas, beans, Irish potatoes, sweet potatoes, sorghum, cassava and finger millet while the cash crops are coffee, cotton, macadamia and pyrethrum. Livestock products include honey, beef, mutton as well as hides and skins. However, little value addition is done to these products.

== Urbanization ==
Major urban centres in the county are Kabarnet, Eldama Ravine, Marigat, Mogotio, Kabartonjo, Chemolingot, Tangulbei and Kolowa.

== Tourism and wildlife ==
Major attractions include:

- Lake Bogoria and Kapedo Hotsprings
- Lake Bogoria Game Reserve is home to rare kudus, antelopes, zebras, leopards, cheetahs, hyenas, mongoose, monkeys, baboons and jackals. At the shores of Lake Bogoria are more than two million lesser flamingoes and 350 bird species total.
- Lake Baringo
- Lake Baringo Snake Park has many snake species such as the black mamba, puff adder, boomslang and spitting cobra, monitor lizards, crocodiles and tortoises.
- Lake Kamnarok (2nd largest Crocodile Habitat in Africa)
- Kabarnet National Museum and Kipsaraman Community Museum
- Ruko Conservancy
- Cheploch Gorge

== Education ==
Kabarnet town hosts a number of university campuses including those of Baringo University, Mount Kenya University, Egerton University, and Kisii University.

Secondary schools include Kabarnet High School, solian girls, Baringo High School, Kapropita High School, and Kituro High School, Tabagon Girls, Pemwai Girls, Tenges Boys among others

There are six hundred and eighty seven primary schools, out of this 601 are public and 86 are private schools. In Secondary school category they are a total of one hundred and fifty nine (159) schools; one hundred and forty seven being public secondary schools and twelve being private public secondary schools.

== Health ==
Kabarnet County Referral Hospital is the largest and best public hospital in the county. There are a total of 172 health facilities; seven level four, 25 level three and 140 level 2 centres.

== Transport and infrastructure ==
The county headquarters is linked to Nakuru and Eldoret by class C roads which fall under the Kenya National Highways Authority (KENHA).

In January 2016, Fly-SAX began twice-weekly flights between Lake Baringo Airport and Nairobi–Wilson, becoming the first airline to serve the airport.

There are 339 kms of bitumen, 2141 km of murram and 995 km of earth roads in the county. As of 2014 a total of 9 postal offices were spread across the county with letter boxes of 2950 installed. 2510 of them were rented and 440 remained vacant.

== Constituencies ==
The county has six constituencies: Baringo Central, Baringo South, Baringo North, Eldama Ravine, Mogotio, and Tiaty.

== Villages and settlements ==
- Kositei
- Orinie
- Muserechi
- Bartabwa
- Bartolimo
- Barwesa
- Cheberen
- Chemogoch
- Chemoigut
- Chemosusu
- Chepkesin
- Emening
- Kabimoi
- Kapluk
- Kamar
- Kamarabuyon
- Kampi Ya Samaki
- Kapchepkor
- Kapkalelwa
- Kapkein
- Kapkiam
- Kapluk
- Kaption
- Kapturwo
- Kapsok
- Kasisit
- Kewangoi
- Kimnai
- Kimngorom
- Kimose
- Kinyach
- Kipcherere
- Kiptagich
- Kituro
- Kiptuno
- Kolloa
- koroto
- Langarwa
- Logumukum
- Loiminange
- Lorwok
- Maji Moto
- Molo-Sirwe
- Mugurin
- Mukutan
- Noiwe
- Nosuguro
- Nyalilpuch
- Sibillo
- Sigoro
- Sirwa
- Solian
- Sore
- Sorok
- tenges
- cheplambus
- kisonei
- eitui
- Kimalel
- Nakurtakwei
- Kiplombe
- Mandina
- Kanjulul
- Kipkaber
- Sinende

Chemelil

Kibotany Kipkitur Kisanana
