= Idah (name) =

Idah is a name. It may refer to:

== Given name ==
- Idah Nabayiga (born 1979), Ugandan politician
- Idah Nantaba, Ugandan politician
- Idah Peterside (born 1974), Nigerian international football goalkeeper and media officer
- Idah Waringa, Kenyan journalist

== Surname ==
- Adam Idah (born 2001), Irish professional footballer
- Ovia Idah (1903–1968), Nigerian sculptor, painter, carpenter, designer, and educator
- Rowetta Idah (born 1966), also known as simply Rowetta, British musician
