= State House, Nairobi =

Official residence of the President of Kenya

State House
- Ikulu ya Kenya (Swahili)
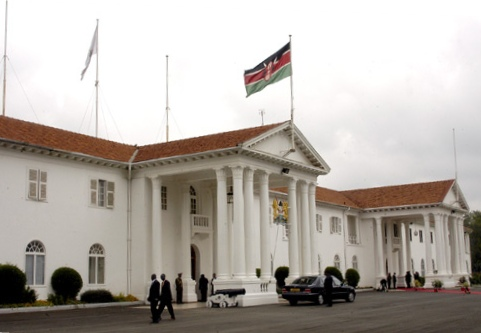
- State House Façade
- Former names: Government House

General information
- Status: Completed
- Type: Official residence
- Architectural style: Palladian, Neoclassical
- Location: State House Road; P.O Box: 40530-00100, Nairobi, Kenya
- Coordinates: 1°16′58″S 36°48′08″E
- Current tenants: William Ruto, (President of the Republic of Kenya), Rachel Ruto, (First Lady of Kenya) and family
- Construction started: 1907 (119 years)
- Completed: 1934 (92 years)
- Renovated: 2024
- Client: British colonial administration
- Owner: Government of Kenya

Technical details
- Structural system: Steel frame and reinforced concrete

Design and construction
- Architect: Herbert Baker

The State House (Swahili: Ikulu ya Kenya) is the official residence and workplace of the president of Kenya. It was the prime minister's residence from independence until 12 December 1964 when Kenya became a republic. As the prime minister's position was abolished, it has been the official residence of the president ever since.

== History ==
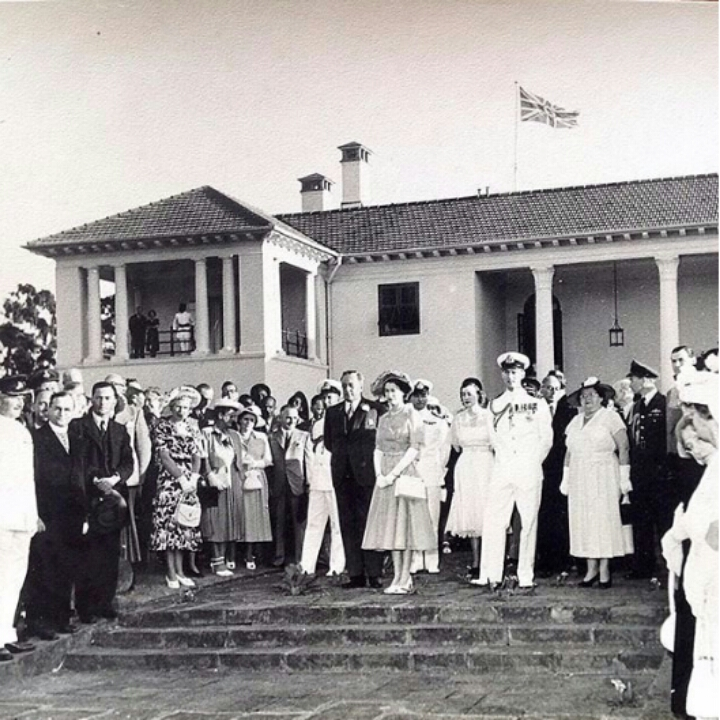
Princess Elizabeth at Government House in British Kenya

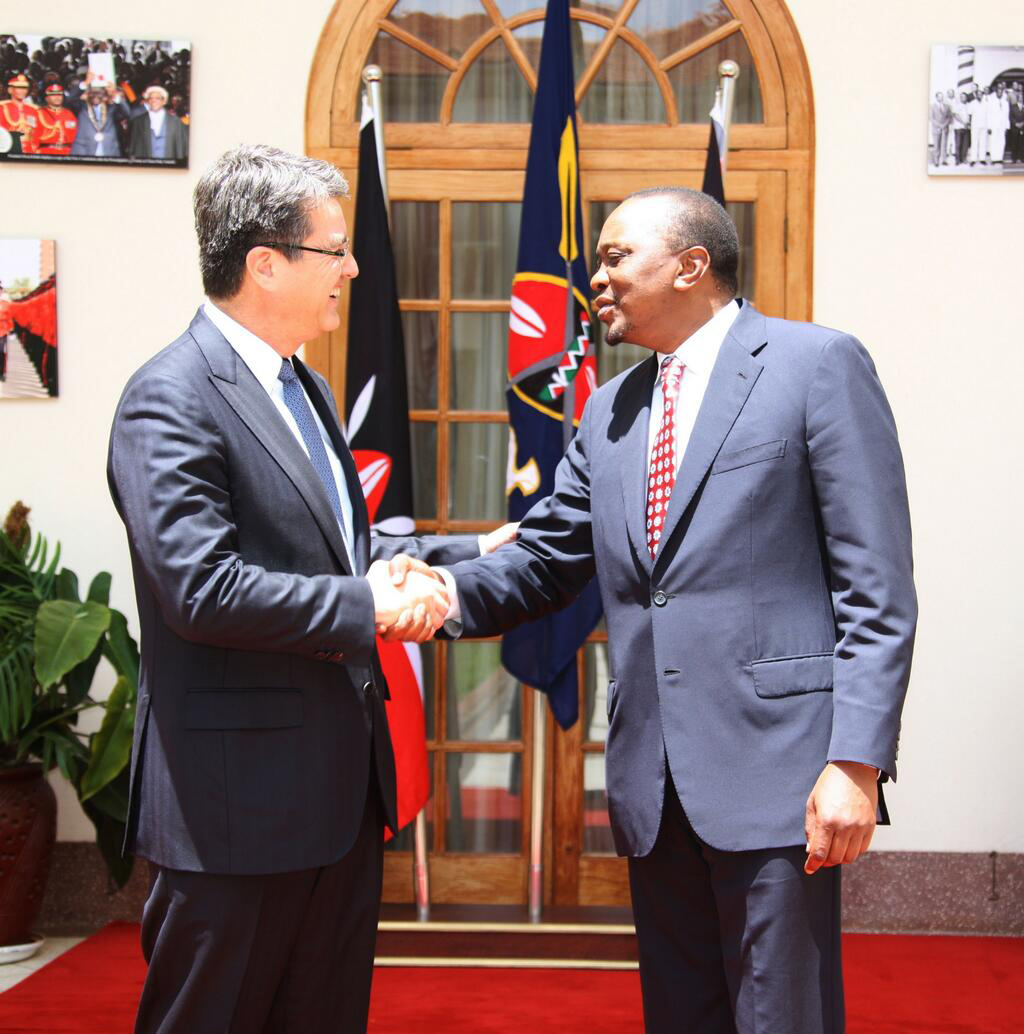
Director-General of WTO Roberto Azevêdo with President Uhuru Kenyatta, at State House (2014)

Before the construction of The Government House in Nairobi, the first governor's residence was at Government House, Mombasa, constructed in 1879. The Government House in Nairobi, now referred to as State House, was built in 1907 in Nairobi to serve as the official residence of the governor of British East Africa, when Kenya was a colony within the British Empire. The governor would conduct his official functions at the old Provincial Commissioner's office (now a national monument) next to Nyayo House and then retire to Government House for the day. It was designed by the British architect Sir Herbert Baker.

After independence, Government House was renamed State House. Although it remained the official residence of the Head of State, it practically became an administrative or operational office occasionally providing accommodation to visiting state guests and receptions on National Days. This scenario has prevailed to-date with Presidents Jomo Kenyatta and Daniel arap Moi preferring private residences as opposed to living in State House.

In July 2025, President William Ruto announced that he would build a church on the grounds of State House using his own funds. The decision was widely criticised, with the Atheists In Kenya Society threatening to sue over what it called "a promotion of Christian nationalism", and Nairobi's Catholic archbishop Philip Anyolo urging a clarification on whether the proposal would favour certain denominations. The Daily Nation also published what is said were architectural designs for the structure, showing a large building with stained glass windows and capacity for 8,000 people, and said that it would be expected to cost $9 million, while raising concern over whether it would violate the secular principles enshrined within the Kenyan constitution.

On 13 October 2025, a man was arrested outside State House after shooting dead a security officer using a bow and arrow at the residence's main gate.

== Other residences ==
State House in Nairobi stands on a 3-square-kilometre (300 ha; 740-acre) piece of land. It is a 10-minute drive from the city centre. Apart from Nairobi, there are other State Houses in Mombasa and Nakuru.

There are state lodges in Eldoret, Sagana, Kisumu, Kakamega, Kitale, Rumuruti, Cheran'gany and Kisii. They are scattered around the country to provide accommodation to the president whenever he is touring various parts of the country.

President Uhuru Kenyatta once met Somali Prime Minister Abdi Farah Shirdon in Sagana State Lodge, which is said to be Kenya's own version of Chequers in Buckinghamshire or Camp David in Maryland. The president was said to be shifting key presidential functions to stations outside Nairobi.

== See also ==
- Government Houses of Africa
- Government Houses of the British Empire
- Governor-General of Kenya
