= Kabimoi =

- Location within Kenya
- Coordinates: 0.02°N 35.78°E
- Country: Kenya
- County: Baringo County
- Time zone: UTC+3 (EAT)
- Climate: Cfb

Kabimoi is a settlement in Kenya's Baringo County in Koibatek District, Eldama Ravine Sub-County. It is home to the late President Daniel arap Moi's 180-acre Kabimoi Farm where his wife, former First Lady Lena Moi, lived from 1974 until her death in 2004.

Kabimoi is a relatively small township with a few shops mostly located on the Eldama Ravine - Nakuru Highway. The distance from Kabimoi to the headquarter town of Eldama Ravine is approximately 10 Kilometres. Kabimoi is one of small towns in Baringo that are developing rapidly.

== Education ==
Kabimoi High School is one of the popular secondary schools in the area.
