= Isaya Yunge =

Tanzanian businessperson (born 1990)

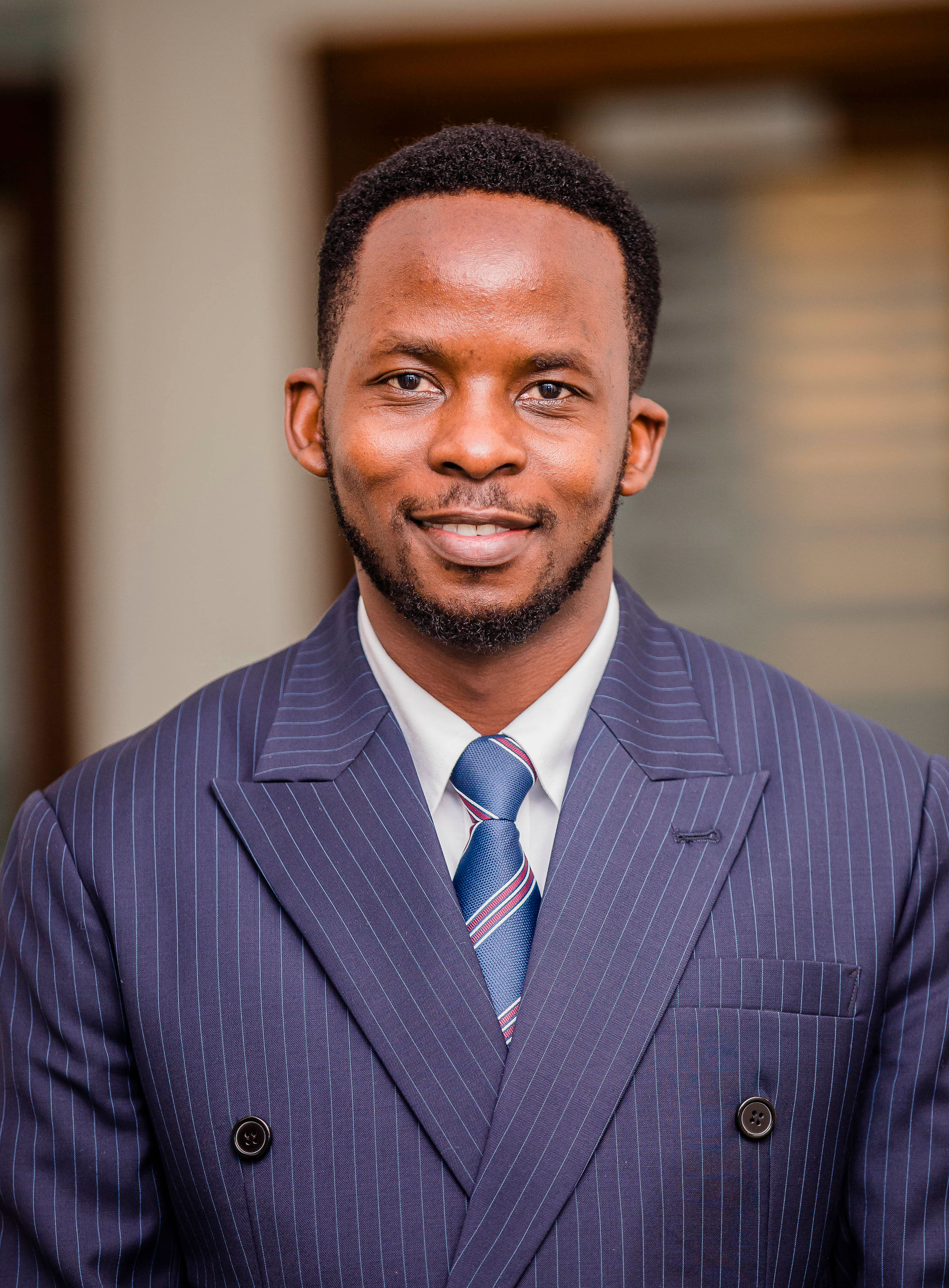
- Yunge in 2023
- Born: Isaya Yunge; 23 March 1990 (age 36); Tanzania
- Education: The Institute of Finance Management, University of Cambridge
- Occupation: Internet entrepreneur
- Years active: 2007–present
- Title: Chief Executive Officer at GOODSAM Technologies, and Co-founder at Smart Kaya, LLC
- Spouse: Charlene Ruto married 2026-present
- Website: goodsam.co.tz smartkaya.com somapp.org isayayunge.com

Isaya Yunge (born 23 March 1990) is a Tanzanian internet entrepreneur, speaker and first African J8 delegate to speak at the G8 2007 Summit. He was one of the two Tanzanians who received the Queen's Young Leader Award in 2018 as a recognition for his work to use a scholarship-matching mobile App (SomaApp) that help more than 7000 young African people to progress in their education. He co-founded SomaApp a mobile application which enables African students to search for scholarships.

In 2007 he was selected by UNICEF to be the UNICEF Africa Youth Ambassador and in this position at an age of 17's he spoke at the G8 2007 Summit as UNICEF Africa Youth Ambassador in Berlin Germany. In 2019 Yunge was named by Avance media to be among the Tanzania's 50 most influential young People.

== Early life ==
Isaya was born and raised in Mwanza, a rock city on the shores of Lake Victoria in northern Tanzania. His parents divorced when he was a little boy, which led him to move from one foster home to another. Although he believed that education was his way out of poverty, he was late to join primary education until the age of 7. Before then, he spent his time herding animals while his peers attended school.

Despite those dire circumstances, Isaya's imagination was not limited as he was a great admirer of Nelson Mandela and dreamed of one day becoming a leader like him. He was determined to break the cycle of poverty and create a better life for himself and his family.

Failing to find acceptance from his own family, Isaya lived part of his childhood in the city of Mwanza where he witnessed the life of street children. There he learned the plight of street children and when he finally joined secondary education he spent his free time bringing together street children and giving them lessons in English and basic mathematics. At the age of 16 Isaya under Sauti ya Watoto Club convinced Radio Free Africa, a local radio station, to create a segment, with him as a host, to bring street children on radio to talk about their life in the streets. The goal was to create empathy in the public for street children. The segment was hugely successful, attracting funding from UNICEF and running for six years with Isaya and members of Sauti ya Watoto Club hosting it for four years. This work highlighted Isaya's contribution to social and community development, and as a result he was selected by UNICEF to serve as UNICEF African Youth Ambassador. In his tenure as UNICEF Africa Youth Ambassador he attended the G8 summit where he was invited by German Chancellor Angela Merkel.

During his university days, at The Institute of Finance Management Isaya started sharing fully funded opportunities to other students to participate in international conferences, workshops and aiming at exposing them to the world where they could gain knowledge and network with other young people.. He began collecting information on these opportunities and sharing them through WhatsApp groups with the student community. Isaya would learn of the frustration students faced applying for scholarships and the very low percentage of students making it into advanced level education. He invented SomApp to address this and the systemic challenges in accessing advanced level education for Tanzanians.

== Career ==
Yunge's enthusiasm in technology industry emerged in 2014 and his visibility increased when he attended a talk with the American economist Jeremy Rifkin on the topic of the fourth industrial revolution, the sharing economy and collaborative commons. He founded SOMAPP Foundation (SomApp) (Soma a Swahili word for Study) a mobile application that helps students to search for scholarships for studies purposes. In 2018 Yunge was mentioned by Forbes to be among 40 African entrepreneurs who represented the continent at the Forbes 30 under 30 Summit in Boston Massachusetts and one of the upcoming Tanzanian billionaires where he spoke with CNBC Africa about the opportunities which the summit could bring to the coming entrepreneurs. Apart from SomApp, Yunge founded other products such as KAYA, a smart speaker using artificial intelligence to collect African related data. He also founded Somafit, smart watch that helps to measures blood pressure and heart beat rate using instantaneous health condition of the user. In his 17's he was among the HIV/AIDS educators who persuaded his fellow youth to abstain from the disease.

== Leadership and awards ==
- In 2018 he received the Queen's Young Leader Award through his scholarship mobile App (SomApp).
- One of the top three startups in the world at The Start-up Turkey Award.
- First prize winner of The 2017 Mobile Money Hackathon in Dar es Salaam (GSMA)
- Chairperson of the Junior Council of the United Republic of Tanzania.

== Personal life ==
On 8 August 2026, he got engaged to Charlene Ruto and later got married on 5th November 2026 in a wedding considered to be the best wedding in Tanzania. Charlene is the daughter of the current Kenyan president, William Ruto.
