= Beyond Zero =

Medical Campaign

- Founded: 24 January 2014
- Founder: Margaret Gakuo Kenyatta
- Type: Non-government organization
- Purpose: Maternal and Child Health
- Headquarters: Nairobi, Kenya
- Location: Kenya
- Region served: Kenya (47 Counties of Kenya)
- Product: Maternal and child health clinics HIV testing and counseling Fistula treatment Other health services
- Method: Free mobile clinics
- Key people: First Lady Margaret Kenyatta Patron
- Endowment: Government of Kenya
- Website: Beyond Zero Campaign homepage

The Beyond Zero Campaign is an initiative launched by Kenya's First Lady, Margaret Gakuo Kenyatta. Its goals are to improve maternal and child health in Kenya, and to reduce new HIV infections among children. The campaign was unveiled in 2013 on World AIDS Day, and launched on 24 January 2014. Many international organizations have joined Kenyatta and the Kenyan government in supporting Beyond Zero.

The campaign's first action was the donation of fully equipped mobile clinics to several counties in Kenya during the summer of 2014, beginning with Taita Taveta County.

== Objectives ==
Beyond Zero has the overall goal of eliminating all preventable maternal and child deaths in Kenya by 2023. It has three primary objectives:

- Raising awareness of the need for good maternal and child health and its relationship to a nation's strength and prosperity;
- Mobilizing funds to support maternal, newborn and child health initiatives and to focus public attention on the challenges surrounding maternal, newborn and child health in Kenya; and
- Educating women on the need for a healthy lifestyle, e.g. participating in sports, and encouraging them to adopt preventive health strategies.

The initiative is a component of the Office of the First Lady's 2013-2017 Strategic Framework, which supports United Nations Millennium Development Goals (MDGs) #4 and #5.

The strategic framework encompasses five key areas:

1. Accelerating the elimination of HIV.
2. Mobilizing funds in support of maternal health, child health, and HIV control initiatives.
3. Educating men in support of the Beyond Zero efforts as clients, partners, and agents of change.
4. Engaging communities to eliminate barriers to access to HIV, maternal and child health services.
5. Providing leadership, accountability, and recognition to accelerate the attainment of HIV, maternal and child health targets.

== Partners and funding ==
Partners and funders have included:

- The German Foundation for World Population
- Concours d'Elegance
- Madonna
- Safaricom
- GE Healthcare
- Nation Media Group
- Philips Africa

The initiative is also supported by an annual half-marathon, in which Margaret Kenyatta runs.

== Successes ==
Under the initiative, there has been a reduction of HIV infections among children from 12,000 cases in 2013 to 6,600 in 2016. The number of women delivering without skilled health workers dropped from 56% in 2013 to 34% in 2016. Maternal deaths decreased from 6,000 to 4,000.

By January 2019, Beyond Zero had donated 52 fully equipped mobile clinics to the 47 counties in Kenya. Some counties received more than one clinic.

== 2018 expansion of scope ==
The initiative expanded its scope in 2018 under the Second Strategic Framework of the Office of the First Lady (2018-2022) to add the following goals:

- Enrolling pregnant women into Kenya's National Hospital Insurance Fund, under the Linda Mama program;
- Supporting treatment of obstetric fistula;
- Offering eye care for the elderly;
- Registering and assessing children with intellectual impairment;
- Making cancer screening available; and
- Making available routine services such as HIV testing and counseling, immunization, and other health-related offerings.

== Recognition ==
=== National recognition ===
- 2017: Beyond Zero won the Kifaru Award from the Kenya Council of Governors in the service delivery category.

=== International recognition ===
- 2014: Margaret Kenyatta was designated UN Person of the Year for her efforts to eliminate preventable maternal and newborn deaths in the country through the ‘Beyond Zero’ campaign.
- 2016: Beyond Zero received recognition as an East Africa Super Brand under the special category of Corporate Social Responsibility. It was celebrated as the initiative of the year.
- 2017: Margaret Kenyatta received the Royal College of Obstetricians and Gynecologists Fellow of Honoris Causa Award in recognition of her commitment to maternal and child health.
- 2018: Margaret Kenyatta received the Eastern Africa Lifetime Achievement Award from the Ernst & Young group in recognition of her work with Beyond Zero. This award recognizes individuals who have initiated unique interventions that touch many lives.

== Criticism ==
Beyond Zero has been criticized for under-funding its mobile clinics, leading to a shortage of personnel and basic supplies. There have been allegations of corruption in the awarding of prizes at the annual half-marathon.
