= Reuben Chesire =

Kenyan politician (1941–2008)

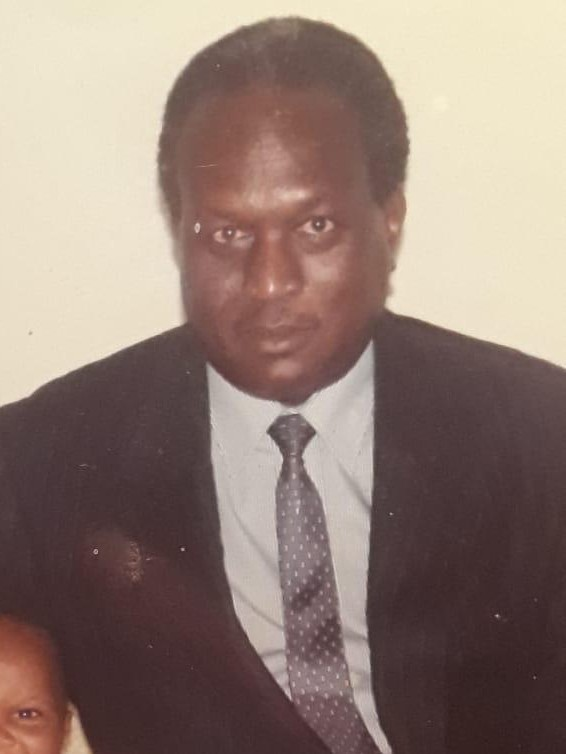
Hon. Reuben Chesire, OGW in 1995

Reuben Kiplagat Chesire (27 March 1941 - 15 November 2008) was a prominent Kenyan politician who served as an MP for Eldoret North Constituency and cabinet minister from 1988 to 1997.

== Early life and education ==
Chesire was born on 27 March 1941 in Kabarnet, Baringo County, the son of Isaiah Chemwetich Chesire and Elizabeth Kobilo Chesire. They grew up with the late former President of Kenya, H.E Hon Daniel Toroitich Arap Moi, who lived with the Chesire's family for most of his childhood. He attended Kapropita Primary School and in 1960 the Royal Technical College Nairobi Kenya, leaving in 1962 after successfully passing his A-levels.

== Career ==
He was appointed as the District Officer (DO) in Kwale later that year. He was the youngest DO ever in Kenya at the age of 21. In 1972, Chesire was elected the first African Chairman of the Kenya Farmers Association. Between 1973 and 1981 he served as the chairman of the African Tours and Hotels, which was listed on the Nairobi Securities Exchange. He also chaired the boards of the Kenya Dairy Board, Industrial Development Bank, ICDC amongst many others.

A passionate farmer and livestock breeder, he is regarded a ‘mid wife’ figure to Kenya's agriculture sector having pioneered many reforms in the agriculture sector during his term as KFA chairman and later as the Minister of Livestock.

His Ayrshire dairy herd at Makongi Farm is world renowned and he is distinguished as having served as President of the Ayrshire breeders societies worldwide.

== Political career ==
In the 1988 Kenyan general election he was elected as the member of parliament for Eldoret North Constituency, located in the former Uasin Gishu County, representing the Kenya African National Union. He was subsequently re-elected at the 1992 Kenyan general elections. He lost his seat to the current president William Samoei Ruto in the general elections held in December 1997. He unsuccessfully challenged Ruto for the Eldoret North Constituency at the 2002 Kenyan general elections.
