= Rachel Ruto =

First Lady of Kenya since 2022

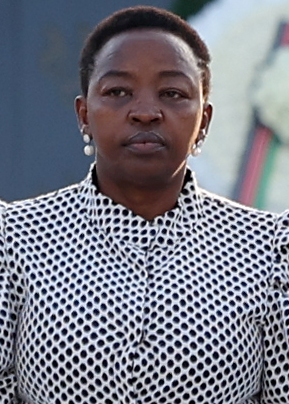
- Rachel Ruto in 2022

First Lady of Kenya
- Incumbent
- Assumed role 13 September 2022
- President: William Ruto
- Preceded by: Margaret Kenyatta

Second Lady of Kenya
- In role 9 April 2013 – 13 September 2022
- Deputy President: William Ruto
- Preceded by: Pauline Musyoka
- Succeeded by: Dorcas Wanjiku Rigathi

Personal details
- Born: Rachel Chebet; 20 November 1969 (age 56) Likuyani, Kakamega, Kenya
- Party: UDA
- Spouse: William Ruto (m. 1991)
- Children: 6, including Charlene Ruto
- Education: Kenyatta University; CUEA
- Occupation: Teacher

Rachel Chebet Ruto (born 20 November 1969) is a Kenyan educator currently serving as the First Lady of Kenya. She is the wife of William Ruto, the fifth and current President of Kenya.

== Education and career ==
She went to Likuyani Primary School, Kakamega County and thereafter proceeded to Butere Girls High School for her O and A levels. She passed her advanced level education and subsequently was called to join the Kenyatta University where she pursued a Bachelor of Education (Arts) degree. She went on to earn her Master of Arts in 2011 at the Catholic University of Eastern Africa.

Although she studied Education, she did not get a chance to practice teaching for long as she voluntarily retired and ventured into entrepreneurship in the tour and travel business focused on tourist trap cities in the country.

== Philanthropy and activism ==
Rachel is an advocate for women's right and empowerment through the Joyful Women organisation founded in 2009.

On 17 January 2014, Rachel Ruto was awarded the International Honorary Fellowship Award On Women Empowerment at the Binary University in Malaysia.

She has been championing for healthy living through physical exercise such as cycling and launched the Mama Cycling Initiative in September to promote the practice.

In March 2023, she expressed opposition to same sex relationships, following a Kenyan Supreme Court ruling allowing LGBTQ groups to organise.

== Family ==
Rachel and William were married in 1991 at the AIC church. They met while they were in university at a Christian Union rally at the University of Nairobi. Rachel was studying education at Kenyatta University while her husband was taking botany and zoology at the University of Nairobi. The couple has six children including Charlene. The couple adopted baby Nadia, who had been buried alive. They named the baby Cherono, after Ruto's mother.

== Controversies ==
=== Karen residence borehole miracle (May 2022) ===
In 2022, Rachel stated that she purified dirty borehole water through prayer. This happened during a meeting with the clergy at the deputy president's residence in Karen. Rachel expressed her frustrations that despite purchasing expensive purification equipment, the purifiers kept breaking down and this led her to the thought of seeking a solution through prayer. These remarks faced heavy backlash from Atheists in Kenya who dared Rachel to perform the miracle in other parts of the country as evidence to her claims.

=== Praying for childless woman who gave birth to twins (May 2026) ===
Rachel recounted praying for a woman she had met in Bungoma who was struggling with childlessness and she later conceived twins. She narrated how a woman approached her while she was in her village and gave her the news of being blessed with 2 daughters

=== State house prayers and food security claims ===
In an interview with America's CBN news, Rachel sparked controversy after asserting that Kenya had achieved food security as a result of overnight prayers that were held in state house. She said that at the time of president William Ruto's swearing in, the country was facing severe drought and upon holding a prayer rally in February 2023, it only took a month before rains began to pour. She attributed that the rains resulted in bumper food harvest, resulting to enough food to feed the country which was contradictory as various parts of the country continued to face food shortage due to dry weather.
