= Majimbo =

Political devolution of power to the regions of Kenya

Majimbo (the Swahili word for "regions") is a Swahili term that is commonly used in Kenya to refer to the idea of political devolution of power to the country's regions. It is alleged by critics, including former vice-president Oginga Odinga in his book Not Yet Uhuru, to have been coined by European settlers in Kenya's White Highlands region, around the time of independence in 1963, who preferred to retain an autonomous, ethnically based governance over the region. It has also been alleged, by some of its critics, that majimbo is a pretext for the type of communal violence that has plagued Kenya's elections especially since the return of multiparty politics. In his autobiography Illusions of Power, G.G Kariuki, a long serving KANU Member of Parliament, went as far as to allege the existence of a plot to instigate communal violence in Kenya's independence elections by supporters of a Majimbo system of government.

== Independence-era ==
The original plan, as created by Wilfrid Havelock, Michael Blundell, and R. S. Alexander, would have resulted in three self-governing regions (Rift Valley, Western and Coast) in Kenya, which would share governance of the country based upon the mandate of the regional governments. This way, the Kikuyu and Luo people would each receive their own majority-ethnic governments and would negotiate with each other and with the other region for the creation and execution of any law on the national level. This was assumed as reasonable because of the fear that tribalist politics between the Kikuyu and Luo under a Westminster system would have been damaging for the other ethnic minorities in Kenya, including the European settlers and Asian residents. It became a part of the party platform for Ronald Ngala's KADU, which competed in the first post-independence elections against Jomo Kenyatta's nationalist Kenya African National Union party. In the Lancaster House constitutional conferences, Ngala's KADU delegation managed to negotiate the adoption of a federal system of governance for Kenya, with 8 autonomous regions based on the country's provinces. However amendments to Kenya's constitution meant by 1970 Kenya had reverted to being a unitary state.

== Moi-era and post-Moi usage ==
At one point during his presidency, Daniel arap Moi is alleged to have favoured the idea of majimbo for the regions. The communal violence allegedly organised by the Youth for Kanu '92 lobby group, which broke out during the 1992 general election, featured rhetoric identifiable with a more violent interpretation of the Majimbo advocating for the mass relocation of Kenyans to their respective tribes' ancestral homelands. However, since the end of his government, he is known to have denounced the idea.

=== 2007 election ===
Both the Orange Democratic Movement, under Raila Odinga, and the ODM-K, under Kalonzo Musyoka, had also endorsed a plan of ethnoregional decentralisation, as had the Shirikisho Party, which was part of the Party of National Unity, as part of their platforms for the 2007 Kenyan elections. Under Raila's majimbo plan, which followed the Bomas draft of the proposed constitution of 2004, the nation would be divided into 13 regions, which in turn would be divided into a number of districts. Each district will have an elected government, a budget and a parliament. The central government would be in charge of national institutions like armed forces, universities, national hospitals and highways. The plan, however, became a central point of opposition against Raila's and Musyoka's campaigns for the presidency, as it was seen by the PNU, and as it was seen by the KANU party of Uhuru Kenyatta, as a threat to national unity and the return of ethnic violence to the country.

== Controversy over the term ==
Because of its original usage as a plan for ethnoregional devolution that was promoted by the European settlers as a post-independence fallback bid to retain some political power in a majority-Black African country, the later usage of the term as "devolution" has engendered controversy in the press. Indeed, the Bomas draft defines devolution as usambazaji wa madaraka (literally, "division of self-governance") and in the campaigns for the 2010 constitutional referendum, within which devolution again, featured as part of the draft constitution, the term Majimbo was ignored by the proponents of the draft, in favour of 'Ugatuzi.'
