= Irreligion in Kenya =

Atheism belief in Kenya

Irreligion in Kenya

Irreligion in Kenya refers to the absence of religious affiliation or belief in a deity. According to the 2019 Kenya Population and Housing Census, 755,750 people (1.6%) identified as having no religion or being atheists. Kilifi County recorded the highest proportion at 10.18%, followed by Narok County (3.97%) and Baringo County (3.58%). The former Rift Valley Province also recorded relatively high proportions, including Nakuru County (3.16%), Laikipia County (3.05%), West Pokot County (2.93%) and Kericho County (2.79%). The lowest proportions were recorded in northeastern Kenya, particularly in Mandera County (0.003%), Wajir County (0.005%) and Garissa County (0.012%).. Atheism is greatly stigmatized in Kenya.

Harrison Mumia registered the first atheist society in Kenya on February 17, 2016. The Kenyan Government suspended the registration of the Atheists In Kenya Society barely three months after it was registered. Harrison Mumia moved to the High Court of Kenya to challenge the suspension of the society and won the case in February, 2018.

== Demography ==
According to the 2019 census, about 755,000 Kenyans identify as irreligious or atheist. Atheist advocacy groups claim that the number of irreligious Kenyans is closer to 1.5 million.

== List of non-religious Kenyans ==
- Barack Obama Sr.
- Richard Leakey
- Harrison Mumia, President of the Atheists In Kenya Society
- Ssemakula Mukiibi, Chairman of Freethinkers Kenya Association (FIKA)

== See also ==
- Religion in Kenya
- Islam in Kenya
- Demographics of Kenya
