= Lucy Kibaki =

First Lady of Kenya (2002–2013)

Her Excellency Lucy Kibaki
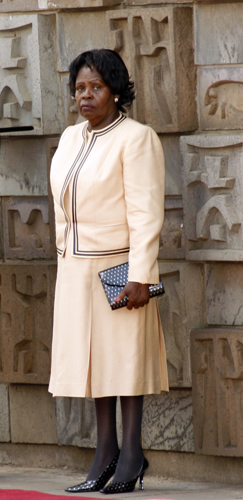
- Kibaki in 2003

First Lady of Kenya
- In role 30 December 2002 – 9 April 2013
- President: Mwai Kibaki
- Preceded by: Lena Moi
- Succeeded by: Margaret Kenyatta

Second Lady of Kenya
- In role 14 October 1978 – 24 March 1988
- Vice President: Mwai Kibaki
- Preceded by: Lena Moi
- Succeeded by: Margaret Wanjiru Gakuo

Personal details
- Born: Lucy Muthoni; 13 January 1936 Mukurwe-ini, Kenya Colony
- Died: 26 April 2016 (aged 80) Bupa Cromwell Hospital, London
- Spouse: Emilio Mwai Kibaki (m. 1961)
- Children: Judy Wanjikū*; Jimmy Kibaki*; David Kagai*; Tonny Githinji*

Lucy Muthoni Kibaki (13 January 1936 – 26 April 2016) was the wife of former Kenyan President Mwai Kibaki and was the third First Lady of Kenya from 2002 to 2013.

== Biography ==
Lucy Mūthoni was born in 1936. Her parents were Rev. John Kagai, a pastor of the Presbyterian Church of East Africa and Rose Nyachomba, in Mukurwe-ini, Nyeri County, (formerly Nyeri District in Central Province), Kenya. She was educated at Alliance Girls High School, then trained as a teacher, working first at Kamwenja Teachers College and later at Kambui College in Kiambu, where she rose to the post of principal.

She met Emilio Mwai Kibaki in 1959. After a two-year romance, they married in 1961, with Lucy quitting her teaching career in 1963. They had four children.

Lucy died on 26 April 2016 at Bupa Cromwell Hospital in London, after a brief hospitalization at the Nairobi Hospital for chest pains. She was 80.

== Charitable work ==
Lucy Kibaki was involved in programs to tackle HIV/AIDS. She chaired the Organization of the 40 African First Ladies Against HIV/AIDS. She initiated Starehe Girls Center and the Mama Lucy Kibaki Hospital. Lucy Kibaki was known for supporting disadvantaged and disabled people.

Lucy was a patron of the Kenya Girl Guides Association.
