= Hustler Fund =

Kenyan loan project

The Financial Inclusion Fund
- Type: Parastatal
- Founded: 2022
- Founder: Government of Kenya
- Key people: Irene Karimi, Chairperson of the Board of Directors; Elizabeth N. Nkukuu, Chief Executive Officer (Acting)
- Website: www.hustlerfund.go.ke

The Hustler Fund, administratively also known as The Financial Inclusion Fund, is a loan project led by the Kenyan government which provides instant loans to Kenyan citizens upon request. The program was launched by President William Ruto in late 2022 with the intention of providing at least $420 million in loans.

== History ==
The Hustler Fund was a campaign promise made by William Ruto during Kenya's 2022 presidential election. Ruto had run on a platform dedicated to creating a "new economic order" and the Hustler Fund was a key aspect of this platform. A majority of Kenyan citizens are in a state of perpetual debt as a result of the widespread nature of digital loans, which Kenyans often use to pay for everyday purchases. Those loans often carry high interest rates, making it impossible for average citizens to pay them off.

The fund was launched on November 30, 2022. It was announced that the fund would have access to a funding pool of 50 billion shillings (roughly $409 million USD) a year over at least five years and would provide individual loans of up to KSh 50,000. Loans were restricted to four types: personal finance, micro loans, small and medium enterprise loans, and start-up loans. Borrowers are charged a flat interest rate of 8% a year. Shortly after launch, the Fund was revealed to be in violation of Kenyan data privacy laws as the Fund's privacy policy was not written in language understandable by lay people.

By January 2, 2023, the fund had loaned over 20 billion shillings. The same day, Ruto announced that the government was working on a "second phase" of the program that would increase the total amount of funding available and would target areas of the economy with higher potential for growth. On June 1 (Madaraka Day in Kenya), Ruto announced the launch of the "Hustler Group Loan," a secondary product that would distribute loans between KSh 20,000 and KSh 1,000,000. The group loan is only available to conglomerates of at least ten people. That same day, Ruto said that the total amount loaned had surpassed 30 billion shillings.

In August 2023, Business Daily Africa reported that 29% of the outstanding loan book was at-risk, meaning borrowers were behind schedule on their repayments. With almost 3 billion shillings worth of loans having defaulted, the default rate on Hustler Fund loans was almost double that of commercial banks. To counter this, Ruto announced that defaulters on the Hustler Loan would be unable to access the larger Hustler Group Loan. Also in August, Kenya entered discussions with the World Bank and European Union for increased financial backing for the fund. Simon Chelugui claimed that the World Bank was willing to offer 20 billion shillings of support.

The Fund has been hampered by budget cuts since launch, with The Standard reporting that the fund was only allocated 5 billion shillings in FY 2023's first budget.

In November 2023, during the fund's one year anniversary celebration, Ruto said Kenyans would be able to borrow more as the fund increased borrowing limit by up to 100%. “Additionally, for those who have demonstrated a commitment to saving, and your savings exceed your loan limit, we will double your credit limit,”

== Reception ==
Semafor criticized the Fund's rollout, writing that "the amount available isn't enough to really kick-start a business. And if the money doesn't generate returns, it's hard to see how Kenyans will be able to repay the loans." Some citizens criticized the program for not providing them enough money: for example, a fruit seller in Nairobi applied for a loan but only received 500 shillings (roughly $4 USD). Some critics wondered if Ruto had over-promised, however Ruto himself defended the fund and said it would be continually developed and refined.

A one-year retrospective in The Standard said that the Fund had received a mixed reception. The article criticized the fund for not adapting to individual recipient's needs but noted that the public reception had been positive, saying that many entrepreneurs and artisans had benefited from the program's microloans. The piece concluded that the creation of a regulatory board for the Fund, which only took place several months into the program, would improve the Fund's operation in the future.
