= Lena Moi =

First Lady of Kenya (1926–2004)

First Lady of Kenya
- In office 22 August 1978 – 30 December 2002
- President: Daniel arap Moi
- Preceded by: Ngina Kenyatta
- Succeeded by: Lucy Kibaki

Second Lady of Kenya
- In office 5 January 1967 – 22 August 1978
- Vice President: Daniel arap Moi
- Preceded by: Sheila Murumbi
- Succeeded by: Lucy Kibaki

Personal details
- Born: Helena Tungo Bomett; 1926 Kenya Colony
- Died: 22 July 2004 (aged 77–78) Eldama Ravine, Kenya
- Spouse: Daniel arap Moi (m. 1950; sep. 1974)
- Children: Eight, inc. Gideon Moi

Lena Tungo Moi (née Bomett; 1926 – 22 July 2004) was a Kenyan schoolteacher and educator. She is recognized as the second First Lady of Kenya, despite her separation from her husband, former President Daniel arap Moi. Before largely withdrawing from public life, Lena Moi was highly involved in politics during her role as Second Lady in the late 1960s and early 1970s, especially in her husband's Rift Valley Province, where she supported women's groups and hosted community harambees. She was awarded the Order of the Golden Heart by President Jomo Kenyatta on 1 January 1968 for her service to the community and country.

Moi spent her later years focused on her local community, remaining active in regional women's groups and the Africa Inland Church (AIC) in Ngorobich.

== Biography ==
=== Early and personal life ===
Lena Moi was born Helena Tungo Bomett in 1926. Her parents, including her father, Paul Bomett, were early converts to Christianity in Eldama Ravine. She was the second eldest of her parents' children, including William and Dina. One of her brothers, Harun Bomett, worked as a principal magistrate and served as the former vice chairman of the Kenya Football Federation (KFF), while another brother, Eric Bomett, was an assistant minister. She was raised as a Christian in the African Inland Church.

Lena Bomett attended the Africa Inland Mission (AIM) school in Eldama Ravine and the Tenwek Girls' Boarding School in Kapsabet. She spent some time in the United States with a Christian missionary family, before returning to Kenya to become an elementary school teacher. Meanwhile, Lena Moi's future husband, Daniel arap Moi, had been orphaned early in life and attended school more than 160 kilometers from his home. He often stayed at the same African Inland Church where Lena Bomett attended. Lena Bomett met Moi while both were working as teachers.

Before her marriage, Lena Moi worked as a teacher at the Mission Centre in Eldama Ravine.

Lena Bomett married Daniel arap Moi in 1950 in a wedding officiated by the Rev. Erik Barnett at the African Inland Church Mission in Eldama Ravine. Lena Moi was the first woman in the area to wear a white, Western-style wedding gown, rather than traditional local outfit of a white dress and headscarf. Moi's wedding gown was provided by the Rev. Barnett, a missionary with a close friendship with the couple. Lily Settim, whom Moi had taught at the Mission Centre, was one of Moi's bridesmaids. Daniel arap Moi paid the Bomett family a dowry of two heifers, one ox, and four sheep for the wedding.

After her marriage, Lena Moi left her teaching career to take care of the family and children. She moved to the Tambach Government School, where her husband worked as a teacher and their first two children were born: Jenifer Jemutai Kositany (born 1953) and Jonathan Torodich (1954–2019). Lena and Daniel arap Moi had eight children during their marriage: Jenifer, Jonthan Toroditch, John Mark Moi (born 1958), Raymond Moi (born 1960, a former Member of Parliament for Rongai Constituency), twin brother and sister Philip and Doris (born in 1962), Gideon Moi (born 1962), and an adopted daughter, June Chebet Moi (c. 1964–2024), a businesswoman.

In 1955, Daniel arap Moi was appointed to the Legislative Council representing the Rift Valley, replacing John ole Tameno and marking the Moi family's entry into politics. Moi spent much of his time away from his family touring the Rift Valley in a Land Rover during the height of the Mau Mau rebellion and opening a new posho mill in southern Baringo. In 1961, Daniel arap Moi began a dispute with Lena Moi's parents when her brother, Eric Bomett, ran against him as an independent candidate in the 1961 Kenyan general election. Daniel arap Moi defeated Eric Bomett in the election, though Bomett later became a member of parliament as a "Specially Elected Member" on the Kenya African National Union (KANU) ticket. Still, the election strained relations between Daniel arap Moi and the Bomett family.

=== Public life ===
Daniel arap Moi became Vice President in 1967, thrusting Lena Moi into the national spotlight as Second Lady of Kenya. Lena Moi became actively involved in national and local politics, hosting harambees and working with women's groups in Rift Valley Province. She also moved to the Delamere Flats in the Milimani neighborhood of Nairobi, where she enrolled her children in Saint Joseph's Primary School.

In 1968, President Jomo Kenyatta awarded her the Order of the Golden Heart for her service to the community. The same week she received her award, Second Lady Lena Moi led a delegation which greeted and received Second Lady of the United States Muriel Humphrey upon her arrival at Embakasi Airport in Nairobi, though she held only an unofficial position at the time. Humphrey was in Kenya as part of her husband's listen-and-learn tour of Africa at the time. Lena Moi returned to the airport to receive Vice President Hubert Humphrey and United States Ambassador Glenn W. Ferguson upon their arrival to Kenya as well.

In 1969, Daniel arap Moi purchased the 180-acre Kabimoi Farm in the Village of Kabimoi, where he built a home for Lena Moi. She resided at the Moi family farm in Kabimoi for the rest of her life.

President Kenyatta suffered a major heart attack in 1969, leaving Vice President Moi and, to a lesser extent, Second Lady Moi, to fill in for many of his official events. Daniel arap Moi began to spend more time away from Lena Moi and their children, in favor of political engagements.

Lena Moi and her husband separated in 1974, though the exact cause of their separation remains unclear. There is speculation that Daniel arap Moi's focus on his political career put a strain on the marriage as he spent less time with his family. However, another theory speculates that a 1974 dinner dance at the Rift Valley Technical College ultimately led to the separation between Lena Moi and her husband. The dinner was attended by President Jomo Kenyatta, First Lady Ngina Kenyatta, Vice President Daniel arap Moi, and Second Lady Lena Moi. As part of the reception, Vice President Moi danced with First Lady Kenyatta. Second Lady Moi was also asked to dance with President Kenyatta, but she reportedly refused, citing her deep Christian beliefs. The incident greatly embarrassed Vice President Moi, according to stories. Daniel and Lena Moi separated soon afterwards. However, photographs from the dinner show that Second Lady Moi did dance with President Kenyatta, which may disprove this story as a cause of the marital split.

Shortrly after their split, Lena Moi left the official vice president's residence in Nairobi and permanently moved back to her home at the Kabimoi Farm in Kabimoi. Her oldest son, Jonathan Torotich, moved to the Kabimoi farm with his mother (and later to another home a few kilometers away), while her other seven children remained in Nairobi with Daniel arap Moi. However, President Moi was frustrated that only two of his children, Gideon and June, appeared with him at public events during his presidency and vice presidency. Relations with his other children were sometimes strained after his separation from Lena Moi.

Daniel arap Moi became President of Kenya in 1978 following the death of Jomo Kenyatta. Lena Moi is recognized as the second First Lady of Kenya for his 24-year presidency, despite her separation from her husband and absence from public life. She remained away from public spotlight during his 24-year presidency. Daniel and Lena Moi quietly divorced in 1979, though Lena was kept within the Moi family and remained at the family farm in Kabimoi for the rest of her life. Neither Daniel or Lena Moi ever remarried.

On 1 August 1982, military forces led by Kenya Air Force private Hezekiah Ochuka attempted to overthrow President Daniel arap Moi during the 1982 Kenyan coup attempt. Alarmed by the events, President Moi sent bodyguards to Lena Moi's Kabimoi farm to evacuate his wife to a more secure location during the coup. When several trucks carrying soldiers arrived at her home, the first lady refused to leave with them, firmly telling President Moi's soldiers, "No". According to accounts written by author Andrew Morton, "The men went inside and removed their caps while she knelt in supplication. As she prayed for the country, for deliverance from the enemy, and for her husband's protection, a soldier sitting outside...yelled the news that the enemy had been defeated." The coup attempt failed, President Moi remained in office, and Lena Moi remained at her farm in Kabimoi.

=== Later life ===
Lena Moi spent the rest of her life at the Kabimoi Farm, generally avoiding the media and public attention. However, she remained hopeful that her husband would someday return to her once he left politics. She kept a room in her home dedicated to her former husband, in case he returned.

She joined local women's groups and remained active with the Africa Inland Church (AIC) in Ngorobich, but remained under surveillance by the Moi government. Moi declined to attend the weddings of her other children, though some reports suggest she was banned from attending by Daniel arap Moi's security forces. Instead, she watched her children's weddings on the Kenya Broadcasting Corporation like the general public. She quietly attended the funeral of her father in 1997.

Lena Moi suffered from high blood pressure and other health conditions during her later years. In 2002, she had been hospitalized in Nairobi, according to her neighbors. Due to her failing health, her husband, former President Daniel arap Moi and two of their daughters, Doris and Jennifer, visited and prayed with Lena Moi on Thursday, 22 July 2004. By all accounts, the visitation went well, but Lena Moi's condition rapidly deteriorated once her family had left for the evening. Lena Moi died from hypertension a few hours later on Thursday evening, 22 July 2004, while her driver, Solomon Komen, was transporting her from her home in Kabimoi to Mercy Mission Hospital in nearby Eldama Ravine. Moi, who was 74 years old, was pronounced dead at Mercy Mission Hospital.

Former First Lady Lena Moi was buried at Daniel Arap Moi's second farm at Kabarak, near Nakuru, despite having never visited or lived in the home during her lifetime. Her funeral was conducted by Bishop Silas Yego of African Inland Church, with speeches by former President Moi and President Mwai Kibaki. Thousands attended former First Lady Lena Moi's funeral and burial at Daniel arap Moi's farm in Kabarak. Dignitaries in attendance at her burial included President Kibaki, First Lady Lucy Kibaki, and her husband, former President Daniel arap Moi.

Former President Daniel arap Moi was buried next to his late wife at his Kabarak farm upon his death in 2020.

== Honors ==
- Order of the Golden Heart (1 January 1968)
