= Charlene Ruto =

Daughter of Kenyan President Ruto

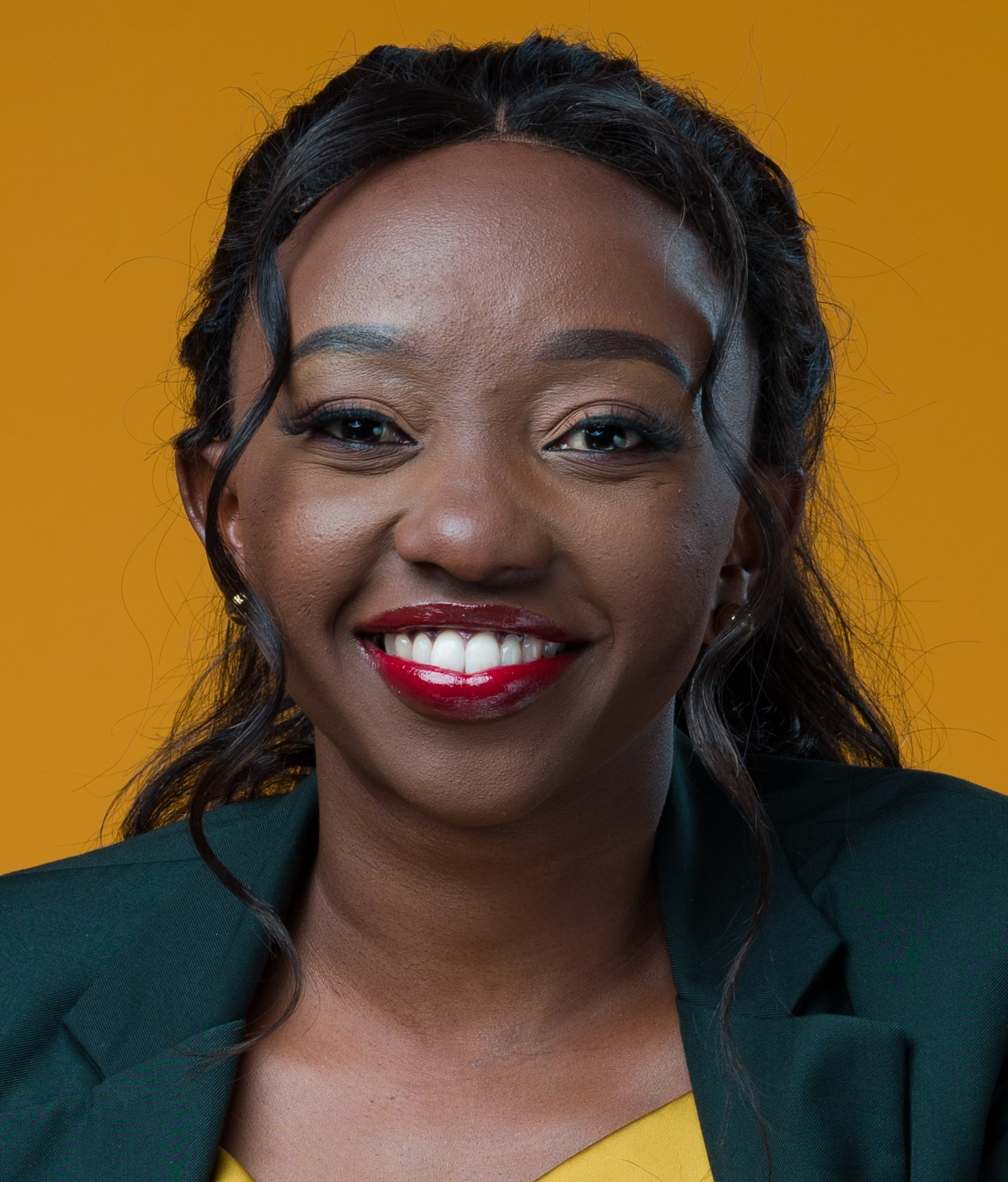
- Ruto in 2022
- Born: Charlene Chelagat; 11 January 1993 (age 33); Nairobi, Kenya
- Education: Daystar University; Les Roches International School of Hotel Management
- Occupation: Public relations
- Known for: William Ruto's daughter
- Parents: William Ruto (father); Rachel Ruto (mother)
- Website: charleneruto.com

Charlene Ruto (born 11 January 1993) is the daughter of William Ruto, the current Kenyan president. She is a political figure, public relations consultant, and philanthropist. Ruto has participated in national and international forums, often under her unofficial "Office of the First Daughter" role. In addition to her First Daughter role, Ruto has worked in media relations, Public relations, and philanthropy.

== Education ==
Charlene Chelagat Ruto is the third-born daughter to Kenya's President William Ruto and First Lady Rachel Ruto.

Charlene holds a bachelor's degree in Mass Communication from Daystar University, and a Master of Business Administration in Hospitality from Les Roches International School of Hotel Management in Crans-Montana, Switzerland. Between August 2012 to January 2013, she was a foreign exchange student at Northwestern College.

Charlene is certified in Kenyan Sign Language and a member of the Deaf community.

== Career ==
Since 2018, Charlene has worked as a Media Relations Officer at Mobile Decisioning Holding Limited and as the Director of Public Relations and Branding at Weston Hotel.

Charlene campaigned for her father ahead of the 2022 Kenyan general election, and after his inauguration in September 2022, she has been actively attending national and global events.

Charlene held 31 official meetings with government representatives and officials from different counties. However, she trended as individuals queried about the basis of her involvement in political matters.

Charlene is the founding patron of the Smart Mechanized Agriculture and Climate Action for Humanity and Sustainability (SMACHs) Foundation.

== Controversies ==
=== Office of the First Daughter ===
In 2022, Charlene had been conducting activities under the unofficial title "Office of the First Daughter", leading to public criticism and questions about the funding source. Despite comparisons to Ivanka Trump and a humorous nickname, "Quickmart Ivanka" or "low budget Ivanka", she continues her engagements. She clarified that her "office" is a private entity, not taxpayer-funded, focusing on youth and climate change advocacy. However, critics argue about the implications of her actions, given her father's anti-dynasty stance.

=== Selling 'smokies' ===
In 2022, Charlene stirred up social media when she shared that she used to sell 'smokies kachumbari', a popular snack, during her time at Daystar University. She stated that 'smokies' were a hot commodity back then, which motivated her to start the small business. Her revelation sparked a variety of responses from the online community, with some doubting the authenticity of her story as her father was the Deputy President then.

=== Youth unemployment remark ===
On 7 February 2024, Charlene faced social media backlash following her comments about Kenyan youth in a TV interview. She encouraged young people to be proactive, start income-generating projects, and participate in global discussions, especially on climate change. However, critics felt her remarks were insensitive and disconnected from the realities faced by Kenyan youth, arguing that her privileged background might have influenced her understanding.

== Personal life ==
On 8 August 2026, Charlene got engaged to Isaya Yunge, a Tanzanian tech and business entrepreneur. The ceremony was held at her father's Intonna Heritage farm in Kilgoris, Narok County.
