= Margaret Kenyatta =

Former First Lady of Kenya (2013–2022)

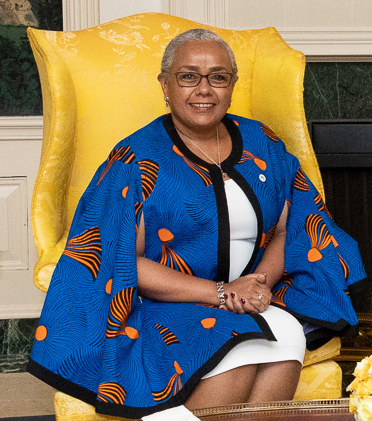
- Kenyatta in August 2018

First Lady of Kenya
- In role 9 April 2013 – 13 September 2022
- President: Uhuru Kenyatta
- Preceded by: Lucy Kibaki
- Succeeded by: Rachel Ruto

Personal details
- Born: Margaret Wanjiru Gakuo; 8 April 1964 (age 62)
- Spouse: Uhuru Kenyatta (m. 1991)
- Children: 3

Margaret Gakuo Kenyatta (born 8 April 1964) is a Kenyan educator who served as First Lady of Kenya from 2013 to 2022. She is married to Uhuru Kenyatta, the fourth president of Kenya.

== Early life and education ==
Margaret Kenyatta was born to a Kenyan father, Njuguna Gakuo, a former director of the Kenya Railways Corporation, and a German mother, Magdalena.She attended Kianda School, St. Andrews School in Molo, Kenya, and received a Bachelor of Education from Kenyatta University.

=== Social activism ===
Kenyatta has voiced her opinion on a number of social issues in Kenya which includes mother and child wellness. She has a mother-baby hospital unit after her name there. Kenyatta has encouraged patients to fight cancer through early screening for breast, cervical and prostate cancer and tackling diabetes by encouraging a healthy lifestyle. Kenyatta is also a big supporter of numerous educational and charity programs in Kenya, taking part in the opening of WE Charity College in Narok County, and promoting the conservation of historic sites and monuments.

Public opinion of her in Kenya tends to focus positively on the simplicity of her fashion and temperament, and negatively on her perceived timidity. Since the inauguration, Kenyatta has headed up a campaign, dubbed the Beyond Zero Campaign, to reduce child maternal mortality rates. On 24 October 2014, she was named Kenya Person of the Year. She is Catholic and serves as an alumna of the Catholic girls' school, Kianda School.

== See also ==
- Beyond Zero
