= Youth for Kanu '92 =

Lobby group of politicians

Youth for Kanu '92 was a lobby group of politicians from the Kenya African National Union that was consolidated with the stated aim of rallying support and funding for the, then incumbent president of Kenya Daniel Toroitich arap Moi, in Kenya's first multiparty elections since the end of the Cold war. It was widely accused of being complicit in ethnic violence directed at Kikuyu residents in the central parts of Rift Valley Province up to and after that manipulating elections under the guise of Majimbo. Politicians who were involved with Youth for Kanu include Cyrus Jirongo, Sam Nyamweya, Patrick Musumba, Gerald Bomett, Micah Kigen and William Ruto (now Kenya's President). It was formed with the blessings of prominent families in KANU with the representation of the children of President Moi among others.
