= Gideon Moi =

Kenyan politician

Member of the Kenyan Senate
- In office 28 March 2013 – 8 September 2022
- Succeeded by: William Kipkorir Cheptumo
- Constituency: Baringo County

Chairman of the Kenya African National Union (KANU)
- Incumbent
- Assumed office April 2012
- Preceded by: Uhuru Kenyatta

Member of the Kenyan Parliament
- In office 2003–2007
- Constituency: Baringo Central

Personal details
- Born: 22 October 1963 (age 63)
- Party: KANU
- Children: 3
- Parent(s): Daniel arap Moi (father); Lena Moi (mother)
- Education: University of Salford (BA)

Gideon Kipsielei Towett Moi (born 22 October 1963) is a Kenyan politician and former senator of Baringo County, from 2013 to 2022. He was elected with a landslide win of over 80% against his opponent Jackson Kosgei. He is also the party leader of the Kenya African National Union (KANU), which for decades was the ruling party in Kenya. He is the youngest son of Kenya's second president, Daniel arap Moi, and Lena Moi. Daniel arap Moi's siblings include; Phillip Moi, Jonathan Moi, John Mark Moi, Raymond Moi (former MP for Rongai), Jennifer Jemutai Kositany, Doris Moi, June Moi.

== Early life ==
He is the youngest son of Kenya's second president, Daniel arap Moi, and Lena Moi. Gideon Moi has seven siblings, namely: Doris Moi, Jennifer Jemutai Kositany, June Moi, Raymond Moi, Jonathan Toroitich, Philip Moi and John Mark Moi.

== Personal life ==
=== Family ===
Moi is married to Zahra Moi, with whom he has three children: Kimoi, Kigen and Lulu.

Moi has played polo for the Gilgil-based Manyatta club.

Uniquely for Kenyan politicians, Moi has managed to keep his personal life private.

In February 2020, Gideon Moi lost his father, the former President of Kenya, Daniel Arap Moi. In July 2004 he lost his mother, Lena Moi.

In July 2025 the media reported a land dispute between Gideon Moi and 56 members of his own clan over a 40-acre parcel in Kabarak that was allegedly gifted by his late father, former President Daniel arap Moi. The clan members claim he attempted to evict them and transfer the land to himself, raising questions about intra-family governance and clan land practices.

== Presidential ambitions ==
Moi is the leader of KANU political party in Kenya. A favoured son of Kenya's former president, he had been groomed as a presidential candidate by his father. In 2017 general elections, he rallied KANU to support Uhuru Kenyatta for a second term, despite Moi's unease for the candidature which also included his political nemesis, William Samoei Arap Ruto.

Moi had announced his intentions to run in the 2022 Kenyan presidential elections but shelved his ambitions after joining the Azimio One Kenya Alliance led by presidential candidate Raila Odinga and its chairman former president Uhuru Kenyatta. He continued to serve as a senator and Chairman of the Senate ICT Committee in the Senate until 2022. He defended his seat in the 2022 elections but lost to William Cheptumo of UDA.

In October 2024, Moi was appointed as Chairperson of the Commonwealth Secretariat Expert Team to observe the general election in Botswana. The mission’s mandate included examining pre‐election preparations, ballot casting, counting and tabulation, and publishing a final report on the conduct of the polls.

In October 2025, Gideon Moi was nominated by Kenya African National Union (KANU) as the party’s candidate for the forthcoming Baringo County senatorial by-election. The announcement followed “extensive consultations, deliberations and consensus within the party and with the people of Baringo.”
