= Olga Marlin =

Educational leader in Kenya (1934–2025)

- Born: Olga Emily Marlinn; November 12, 1934; New York City, U.S.
- Died: January 5, 2025 (aged 90); Nairobi, Kenya
- Education: Trinity College Dublin; University College Dublin
- Occupations: Educator and author
- Known for: Founding member of Kianda School, Nairobi, Kenya
- Notable work: To Africa with a Dream

Olga Marlin (November 12, 1934 – January 5, 2025) was an American-born educator based in Kenya. She is the author of To Africa with a Dream and a founding member of Kianda School, Nairobi, Kenya, which started in 1961 as Kianda Secretarial College, and was the first multi-racial girls' school in East Africa.

Marlin was a member of the Strathmore University University Council.

== Biography ==
Olga Emily Marlin was born in New York City on November 12, 1934, and studied modern languages at Trinity College Dublin, from which she received her MA degree in 1956. She also held a H.Dip.Ed. from University College Dublin (1957).

In 1960, she was sent by Saint Josemaria Escriva to Kenya, at a time when few African women had any access to a formal education, and in 1961 she began, together with other women, Kianda College, a secretarial college that was open to women of all races, which in 1993 became part of Strathmore University.

The second edition of her book To Africa with a Dream, which describes her 50 years of work in Kenya and other African countries, was published in 2011 by Boissevain Books.

In June 2011, she received a Litt.D. degree, honoris causa, from Strathmore University, the first woman to receive an honorary doctorate from the University. Marlin died January 5, 2025, at the age of 90.

== Works ==
- Marlin, Olga (June 9, 2011). To Africa with a Dream. Boissevain Books. ISBN 978-0-9845232-2-1.
