= Eldoret North Constituency =

Kenyan electoral constituency

Eldoret North Constituency was a former electoral constituency in Kenya. It was one of three constituencies in Uasin Gishu District, now Uasin Gishu County. The constituency was established for the 1966 elections.

== Members of Parliament ==
Elections	MP	Party	Notes
1966	Noah Chelugui	KANU	One-party system
1969	William Morogo arap Saina	KANU	One-party system
1974	Chelagat Mutai	KANU	One-party system
1979	Chelagat Mutai	KANU	One-party system. Mutai fled to Tanzania in 1981
1981	Nicanor Kirmurgor arap Sirma	KANU	By-elections
1983	William Morogo arap Saina	KANU	One-party system.
1988	Reuben Chesire	KANU	One-party system.
1992	William Morogo arap Saina	KANU	
1997	William Ruto	KANU	
2002	William Ruto	KANU	
2007	William Ruto	ODM	Split to Turbo and Soy in 2013 elections.

== Wards ==
Wards
Ward	Registered Voters	Local Authority
Eldoret North	1,740	Eldoret municipality
Huruma	13,525	Eldoret municipality
Kamagut	5,836	Wareng county
Kamukunji	4,986	Eldoret municipality
Kapyemit	7,206	Eldoret municipality
Kidiwa / Kapsuswa	8,849	Eldoret municipality
Kiplombe	6,733	Wareng county
Kipsomba	6,064	Wareng county
Koisagat	6,334	Wareng county
Moi's Bridge	9,974	Wareng county
Ngenyilel	7,096	Wareng county
Soy	5,226	Wareng county
Stadium / Industrial	5,120	Eldoret municipality
Sugoi	5,233	Wareng county
Tapsagoi	6,131	Wareng county
Ziwa	9,576	Wareng county
Total	109,629	
*September 2005.
