= St. Andrews School, Turi =

International school near Nakuru, Kenya

Information
- Established: 1931; 95 years ago
- Years: Nursery - Year 13
- Enrollment: c.620
- Website: www.standrewsturi.com

St. Andrews School is a preparatory and secondary independent school situated near Nakuru, Kenya near the town of Molo. It is located in Turi and often referred to by that name.

== History ==
The school was founded by Jean and Peter Lavers in 1931.

On 29 February 1944, the entire school, with the exception of the chapel, was burned down. It was rebuilt by Italian prisoners of war.

In 1988, a senior school for students aged 14 to 18 was added.

A sixth form college was opened in September 2010.

== Notable alumni ==
- Moses Arita, Kenya international footballer
- Douglas Carswell, Independent Member of UK Parliament 2005-2017
- Margaret Gakuo Kenyatta, former first lady of Kenya

== Related links ==
- Official website
