= Idah Waringa =

Kenyan journalist

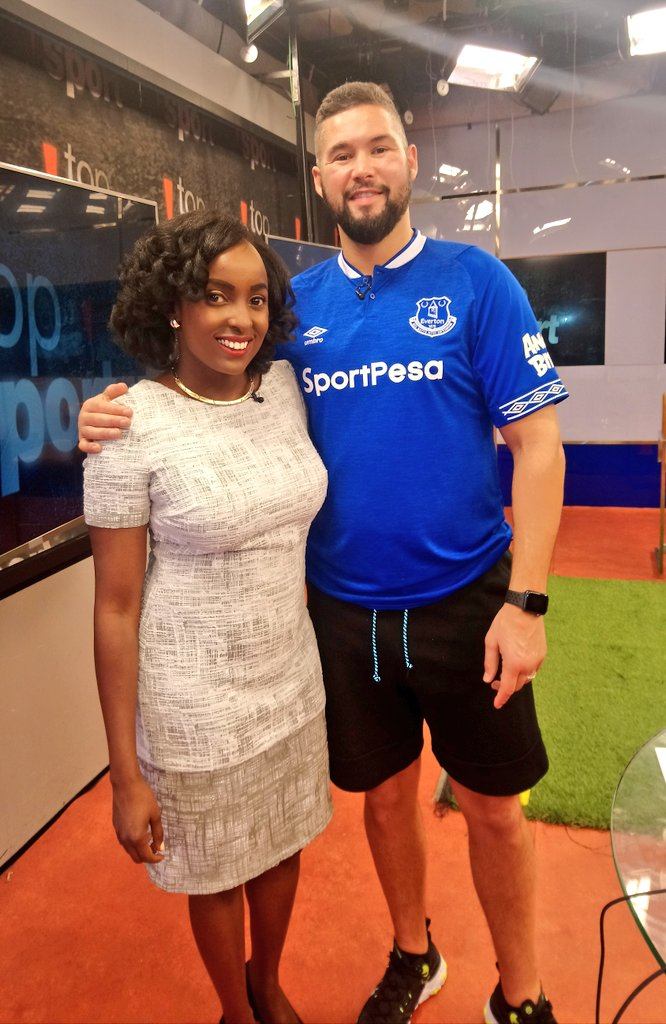
- Idah Waringa with British boxer, Tony Bellew
- Born: Nairobi, Kenya
- Education: Kianda School, United States International University Africa
- Occupations: Multimedia journalist, Presenter, Documentary maker
- Employer: CGTN HQ
- Known for: Investigative journalism, Documentaries, Hosting
- Notable work: "The Football Con" (Documentary)
- Awards: 2019 Excellence Award For Young African Journalists in Sports; 2020 AIPS Awards - Investigative Reporting (shared with Jeff Kinyanjui)

Idah Waringa is a multimedia journalist, presenter, and documentary maker born in Nairobi, Kenya.

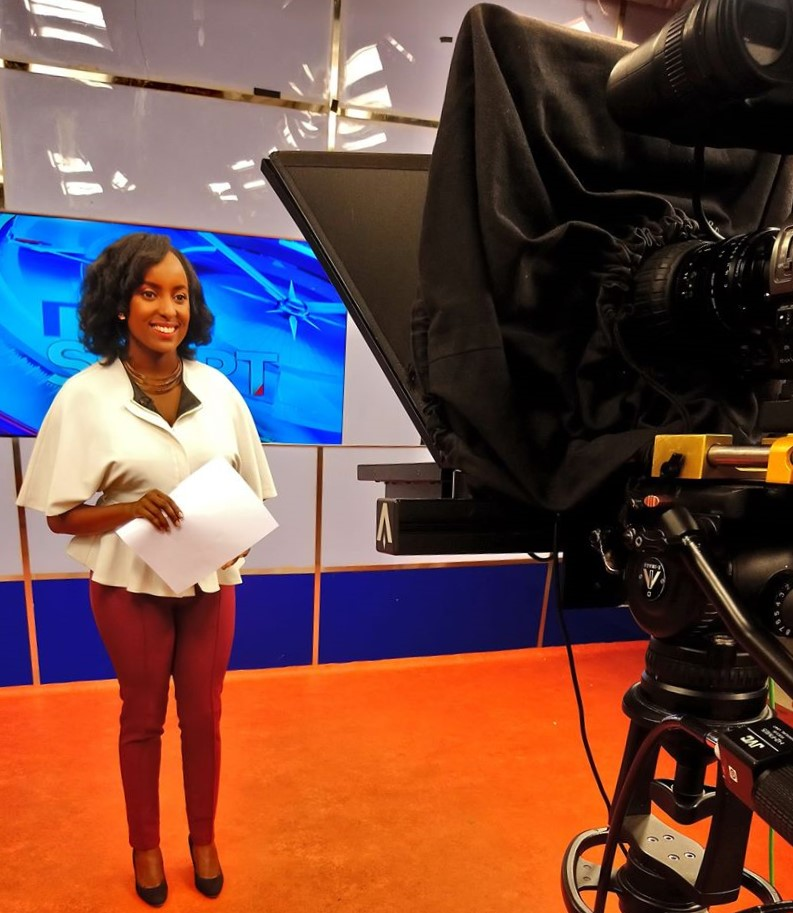
Idah Waringa in the studio

== Biography ==
Waringa received her education at Kianda School in Nairobi, Kenya and pursued further studies at United States International University Africa.

== Career ==
Waringa is presently stationed in Beijing, where she holds the position of News Editor, responsible for covering current affairs at CGTN HQ.

Her career journey includes tenures at Radio Africa Group Limited and the Nation Media Group (NMG) in Nairobi.

She is a contributor to Al Jazeera English, and she serves as a correspondent for the Planet Sport Football Africa show. She has made appearances on the Premier League Productions show "Headline Makers" and has contributed to the International Sports Press Association (AIPS).

In 2020, She produced an investigative documentary named "The Football Con," which aimed to reveal instances of match-fixing in Kenya. This documentary received recognition from the Global Investigative Journalists Network Africa chapter.

Furthermore, Waringa also played a hosting role in significant events. She was involved in launching the 2020 Tokyo Olympics on DSTV and conducted a tour featuring Manchester United legend Dwight Yorke.

== Awards and honours ==
One of Waringa's documentaries, "The Football Con," garnered international acclaim at the 2020 International Sports Press Association (AIPS) Awards in Vigevano, Italy. The documentary received a special category award for investigative reporting, sharing the recognition with colleague Jeff Kinyanjui.

Additionally, Waringa was listed as one of the Top 100 Kenyans in 2020.

She achieved the 2019 Excellence Award For Young African Journalists in Sports, bestowed by the Government of Egypt & African Youth Bureau.

== Interviews ==
Waringa has conducted interviews with prominent sporting figures, including FIFA Ballon d'Or winner Ronaldinho, Manchester United treble-winning sportsman Dwight Yorke, and former English National footballer Theo Walcott. She has also held discussions with American double Olympic gold medalist, USADA Chairman, and World Laureus President, Edwin Moses.
