= William Ruto =

President of Kenya since 2022

His Excellency William Ruto CGH
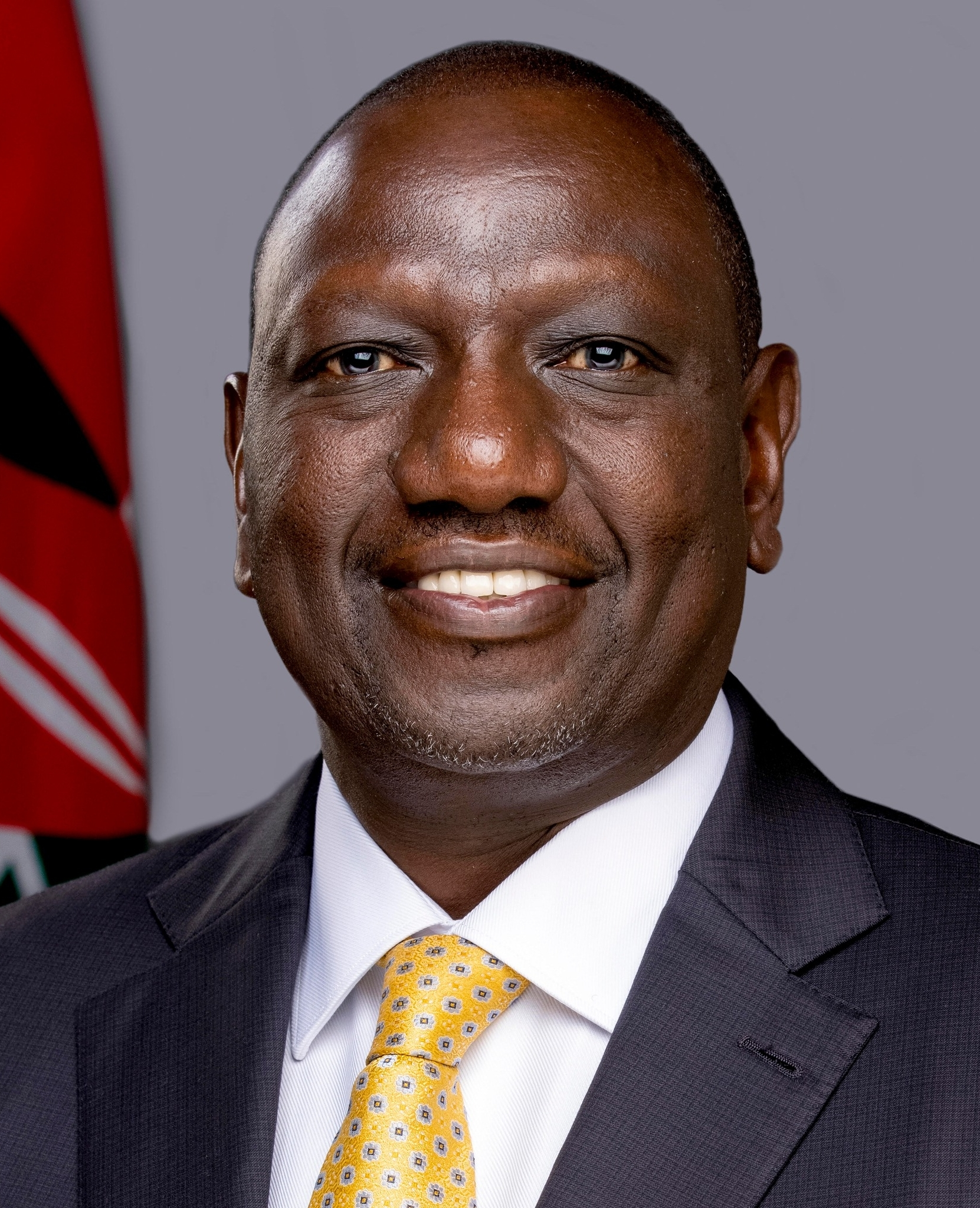
- Official portrait, 2022

5th President of Kenya
- Incumbent
- Assumed office 13 September 2022
- Deputy: Rigathi Gachagua (2022–2024); Kithure Kindiki (2024–present)
- Preceded by: Uhuru Kenyatta

11th Deputy President of Kenya
- In office 9 April 2013 – 13 September 2022
- President: Uhuru Kenyatta
- Preceded by: Kalonzo Musyoka
- Succeeded by: Rigathi Gachagua

Minister for Higher Education
- In office 21 April 2010 – 19 October 2010
- President: Mwai Kibaki
- Prime Minister: Raila Odinga
- Preceded by: Sally Kosgei
- Succeeded by: Hellen Jepkemoi Sambili (acting)

16th Minister for Agriculture
- In office 17 April 2008 – 21 April 2010
- President: Mwai Kibaki
- Prime Minister: Raila Odinga
- Preceded by: Kipruto Arap Kirwa
- Succeeded by: Sally Kosgei

Minister for Home Affairs
- In office 30 August 2002 – December 2002
- President: Daniel arap Moi
- Preceded by: George Saitoti
- Succeeded by: Moody Awori

Member of Parliament for Eldoret North
- In office 29 December 1997 – 9 April 2013
- Preceded by: Reuben Chesire
- Succeeded by: Constituency abolished

Personal details
- Born: William Kipchirchir Arap Ruto; 21 December 1966 (age 59) Kamagut, Kenya
- Party: United Democratic Alliance (2021–present)
- Other political affiliations: Kenya African National Union (before 2005); Orange Democratic Movement (2005–2011); United Republican Party (2012–2016); Jubilee Party (2016–2021)
- Spouse: Rachel Chebet (m. 1991)
- Children: 7, including Charlene
- Education: BSc; MSc; PhD
- Alma mater: University of Nairobi

William Kipchirchir Samoei Arap Ruto CGH (born 21 December 1966) is a Kenyan politician who is the fifth and current president of Kenya since 13 September 2022. Prior to becoming president, he served as the first elected deputy president of Kenya from 2013 to 2022. He previously served in three cabinet portfolios as the Minister for Home Affairs, the Minister of Agriculture and as Minister for Higher Education.

Ruto was elected Member of Parliament for Eldoret North constituency from 1997 to 2007 under the KANU, and from 2007 to 2013 through the ODM party. He was the Minister for Home Affairs in the Daniel arap Moi administration from August to December 2002.

Under the Mwai Kibaki administration, he was the Minister for Agriculture from 2008 to 2010 and Minister for Higher Education from April to October 2010. Ruto first contested for the presidency during the 2007 election, but lost to Raila Odinga on the ODM party primaries; together with Musalia Mudavadi, who finished second, he then supported the candidature of Odinga. He again ran for the presidency on the 2013 election, but withdrew his candidature in favour of Uhuru Kenyatta.

He was later nominated to run for the deputy presidency in the 2013 election under the United Republican Party, becoming the running mate of Uhuru Kenyatta from The National Alliance (TNA). He was re-elected to the deputy presidency under the Jubilee Party in the 2017 Kenyan general election. Following a political fallout, Kenyatta endorsed Raila Odinga as his preferred successor.

Ruto, now running under the United Democratic Alliance (UDA), defeated Odinga for the presidency in the 2022 election. While the election was largely described as fair by the African Union and other international missions, it was contested by Odinga's allies, who alleged electoral fraud. However, the Supreme Court of Kenya upheld the results, ruling that the allegations lacked sufficient evidence to invalidate the outcome.

President Ruto has elevated Kenya's geopolitical profile, positioning the country as a strategic partner for Western powers while championing pan-African interests. Under his leadership, Kenya became the first sub-Saharan African nation to be designated as a Major Non-NATO Ally by the United States. He is also an advocate for climate justice and global financial reform, chairing the inaugural Africa Climate Summit in 2023, which resulted in the Nairobi Declaration, a call for a global carbon tax and a more equitable international debt system.

Regionally, Ruto has played a key role as a mediator in East African conflicts, through the Nairobi Process aimed at ending the insurgency in the Eastern Democratic Republic of Congo and his involvement in the Sudan peace talks. Domestically, his administration has built the Talanta Sports City stadium project and spearheaded the National Tree Growing Restoration campaign, which aims to plant 15 billion trees by 2032 to combat climate change and restore Kenya's forest cover. In June 2024, Ruto's proposed finance bill was the subject of protests in which at least 22 people were killed, causing Ruto to back down and withdraw the bill.

== Early life and education ==
A member of the Kalenjin people from the Rift Valley region, William Ruto is of mixed Kipsigis and Nandi heritage. His father, Daniel Cheruiyot, hailed from the Kapkomoseek clan of the Kipsigis in Kericho, while his mother, Sarah Cheruiyot, (familiarly known as 'Mama Sarah') of Nandi descent.

=== Education ===
Ruto started his education at Kamagut Primary School, then transferred to Kerotet Primary School—both situated within the Uasin Gishu County; and he sat for his Certificate of Primary Education at the latter. He then proceeded to Wareng Secondary School, still in Uasin Gishu County, and later Kapsabet High School in Nandi County, where he obtained his Ordinary Level and Advanced Level education respectively.

He then enrolled at the University of Nairobi to pursue Botany and Zoology, graduating in 1990 with a BSc. He went on to complete an MSc in Plant Ecology, also from the University of Nairobi. The year after his graduation, he enrolled for a Ph.D. at the same university, and after several setbacks, he completed and graduated on 21 December 2018.

Ruto authored several papers, including one titled Plant Species Diversity and Composition of Two Wetlands in the Nairobi National Park, Kenya.

During his time in the campus for his undergraduate education, Ruto was an active member of the Christian Union. He also served as the Chairman of the University of Nairobi's choir. Through his church activities at the University of Nairobi, he met President Daniel arap Moi, who would later introduce him to politics during the 1992 general elections.

== Political career ==
After graduating from the University of Nairobi in 1990, Ruto was employed as a temporary teacher in the North Rift region of Kenya from 1990 to 1992, where he was also a leader of the local church choir, the Africa Inland Church (AIC).

=== YK'92 ===
Ruto began his political career when he became the treasurer of the YK'92 campaign group that was lobbying for the re-election of President Moi in 1992, from which he learned the basics of Kenyan politics. He is also believed to have accumulated some wealth in this period. After the 1992 elections, President Moi disbanded YK'92 and Ruto unsuccessfully vied for various branch-level positions in KANU, which was at that time Kenya's ruling party.

=== Member of Parliament ===
Ruto ran for a parliamentary seat in the 1997 general election. He surprisingly beat the incumbent, Reuben Chesire, Moi's preferred candidate, as well as the Uasin Gishu KANU branch chairman and assistant minister. He later gained favour with Moi and was appointed KANU Director of Elections. His strong support in 2002 for Moi's preferred successor, Uhuru Kenyatta, saw him get a place as assistant minister in the Home Affairs (Interior) ministry. Later in that election, when some government ministers resigned to join the opposition, he was promoted to full Cabinet Minister. KANU lost the election but he retained his parliamentary seat. Ruto was elected KANU Secretary General in 2005, with Uhuru Kenyatta elected as chairman.

In 2005, Kenya held a referendum on a new constitution, which KANU opposed. Some members of the ruling NARC coalition government, mainly former KANU ministers who had joined the opposition coalition in 2002 under the LDP banner and who were disgruntled as President Mwai Kibaki had not honored a pre-election MoU on power-sharing and creation of a Prime Minister post, joined KANU to oppose the proposed constitution. Since the symbol of the "No" vote was an Orange, this new grouping named their movement the Orange Democratic Movement (ODM). Ruto was part of its top brass, dubbed the Pentagon. He solidified his voter base in the Rift Valley Province. ODM was victorious in the referendum.

In January 2006, Ruto declared publicly that he would vie for the presidency in the next general election (2007). His statement was condemned by some of his KANU colleagues, including former president Moi. By this time, ODM had morphed into a political party. Ruto sought the nomination of the Orange Democratic Movement (ODM) as its presidential candidate, but on 1 September 2007, he placed third with 368 votes. The winner was Raila Odinga with 2,656 votes and the runner-up was Musalia Mudavadi with 391. Ruto expressed his support for Odinga after the vote. As KANU under Uhuru Kenyatta moved to support Kibaki, he resigned from his post as KANU secretary general on 6 October 2007.

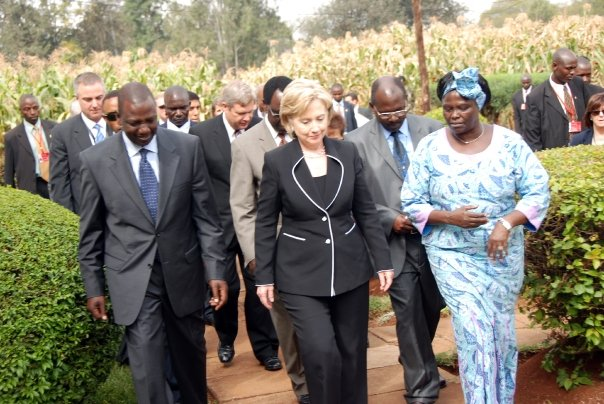
U.S. Secretary of State Hillary Clinton (center) walks with Minister of Agriculture William Ruto (left) and environmental and political activist Wangari Maathai (right) during a tour of the Kenyan Agricultural Research Institute (KARI) near Nairobi, 5 August 2009.

The presidential election of December 2007 ended in an impasse. Kenya's electoral commission declared Kibaki the winner, but Raila and ODM claimed the victory. Mwai Kibaki was hurriedly sworn in as the president of the December 2007 presidential election. Following the election and the dispute over the result, Kenya was engulfed by a violent political crisis. Kibaki and Odinga agreed to form a power-sharing government. In the grand coalition Cabinet named on 13 April 2008 and sworn in on 17 April, Ruto was appointed as Minister for Agriculture. Ruto also became the Eldoret North's Member of Parliament from 2008 to 4 March 2013.

Ruto was among the list of people who were indicted to stand trial at the ICC for their involvement in Kenya's 2007/2008 political violence. However, the ICC case was faced with challenges, especially concerning the withdrawal of key prosecution witnesses. In April 2016, the Court dropped the charges against Ruto.

On 21 April 2010, Ruto was transferred from the Agriculture Ministry and posted to the Higher Education Ministry, swapping posts with Sally Kosgei. On 24 August 2011, Ruto was relieved of his ministerial duties but remained a member of parliament. He joined with Uhuru Kenyatta to form the Jubilee alliance for the 2013 presidential election.

== Deputy presidency ==
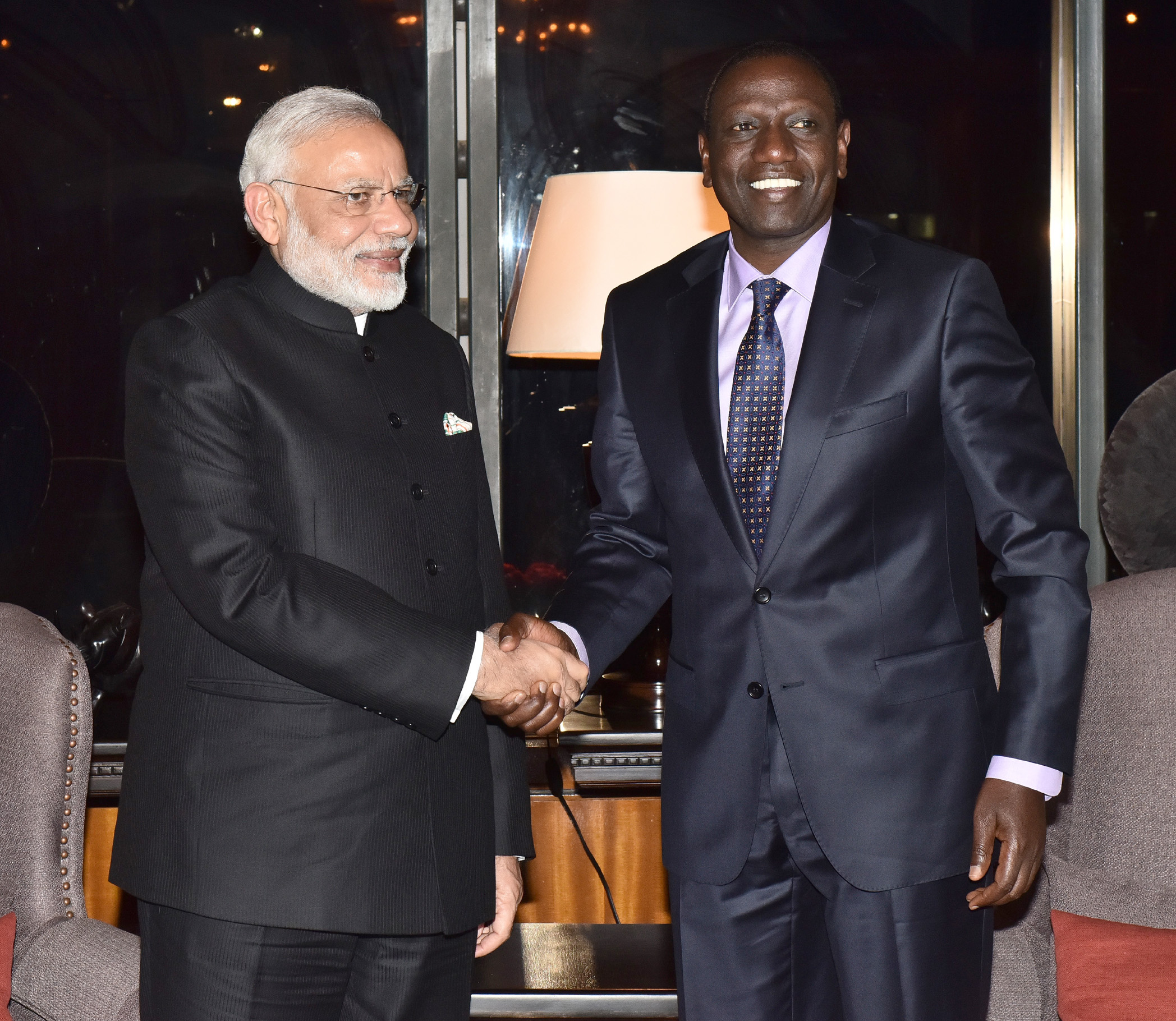
Ruto with Indian Prime Minister Narendra Modi in 2016

=== Acting president ===
On 6 October 2014, Ruto was appointed acting president of Kenya by the then President Uhuru Kenyatta following his summons to appear before the ICC. He served in the role between 6 and 9 October 2014 while President Kenyatta was away at The Hague. When he officially handed over power to Ruto at the Parliament on 6 October, Uhuru explained, "To protect the sovereignty of the Republic of Kenya, I will sign a legal notice appointing Hon William Ruto as acting president while I attend the status conference."

In the August 2017 General Elections, Uhuru and Ruto were declared victors after garnering 54% of the total votes cast. However, the Supreme Court of Kenya nullified the election, and a fresh election was held in October 2017. The opposition boycotted the fresh election and Uhuru and Ruto were re-elected with 98% of the total votes cast. The Supreme Court upheld the results of this second election.

=== Presidential campaign ===
In December 2020 Ruto announced his alliance with the newly formed United Democratic Alliance party. He was the only presidential candidate to attend the second part of the 2022 presidential debate.

On 15 August 2022, six days after the general election held on 9 August, the Independent Electoral and Boundaries Commission chair Wafula Chebukati announced that Ruto had won the presidential election, defeating candidate Raila Odinga of the Azimio La Umoja party. Ruto received 50.49% of the valid votes cast, while Odinga received 48.85%.

Odinga disputed the presidential election results announced by the Independent Electoral and Boundaries Commission, and he challenged the results with the Supreme Court. On 5 September, the Supreme Court judges unanimously found that evidence presented by Odinga's campaign inconclusive and upheld the election of Ruto as the winner of the election. In response to the ruling, Odinga said he respected the Supreme Court's decision even though he strongly disagreed with it.

== Presidency ==
Presidential Standard of William Ruto

Map showing International trips made by William Ruto as President

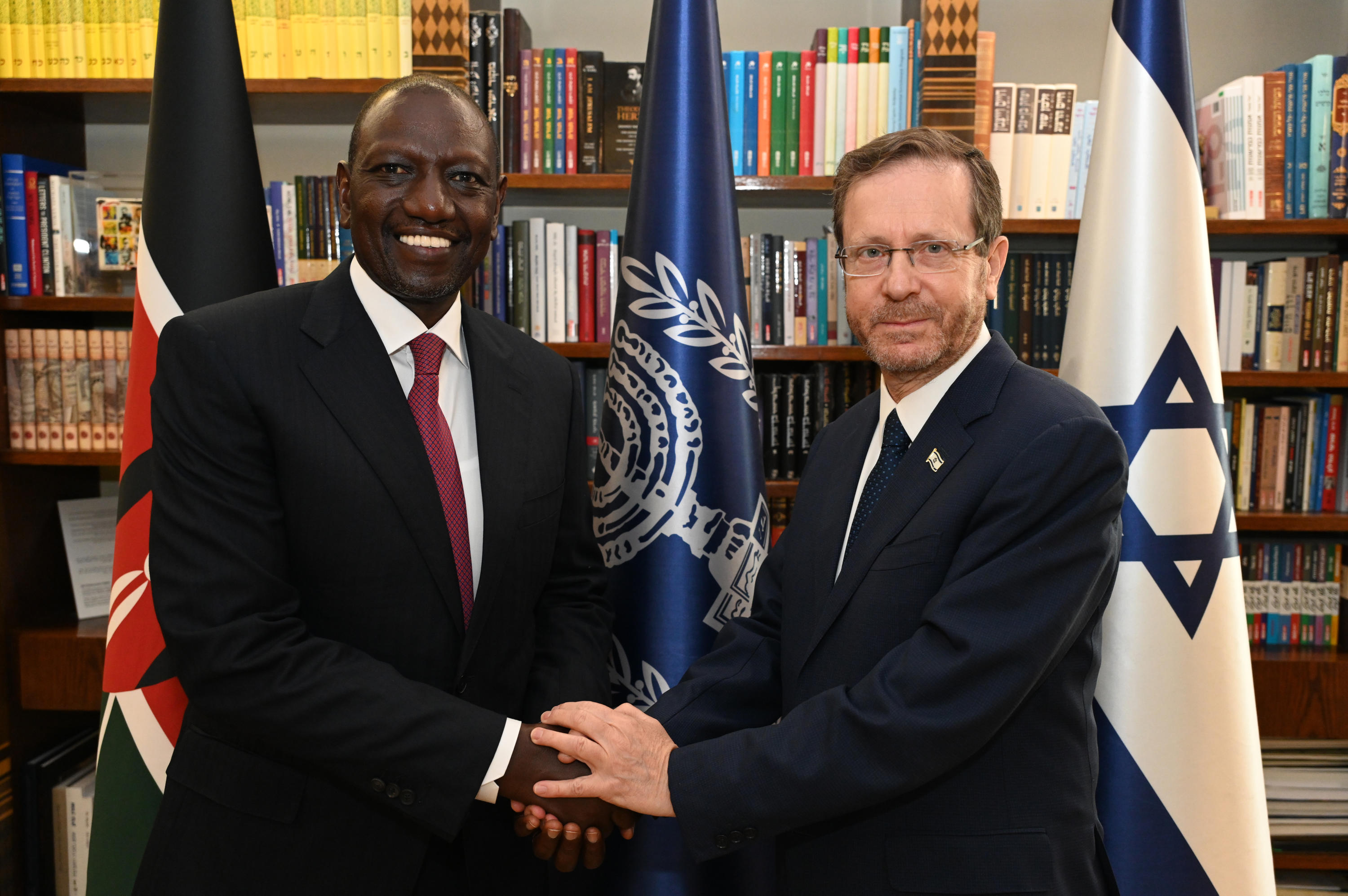
Ruto with Israeli President Isaac Herzog on 9 May 2023

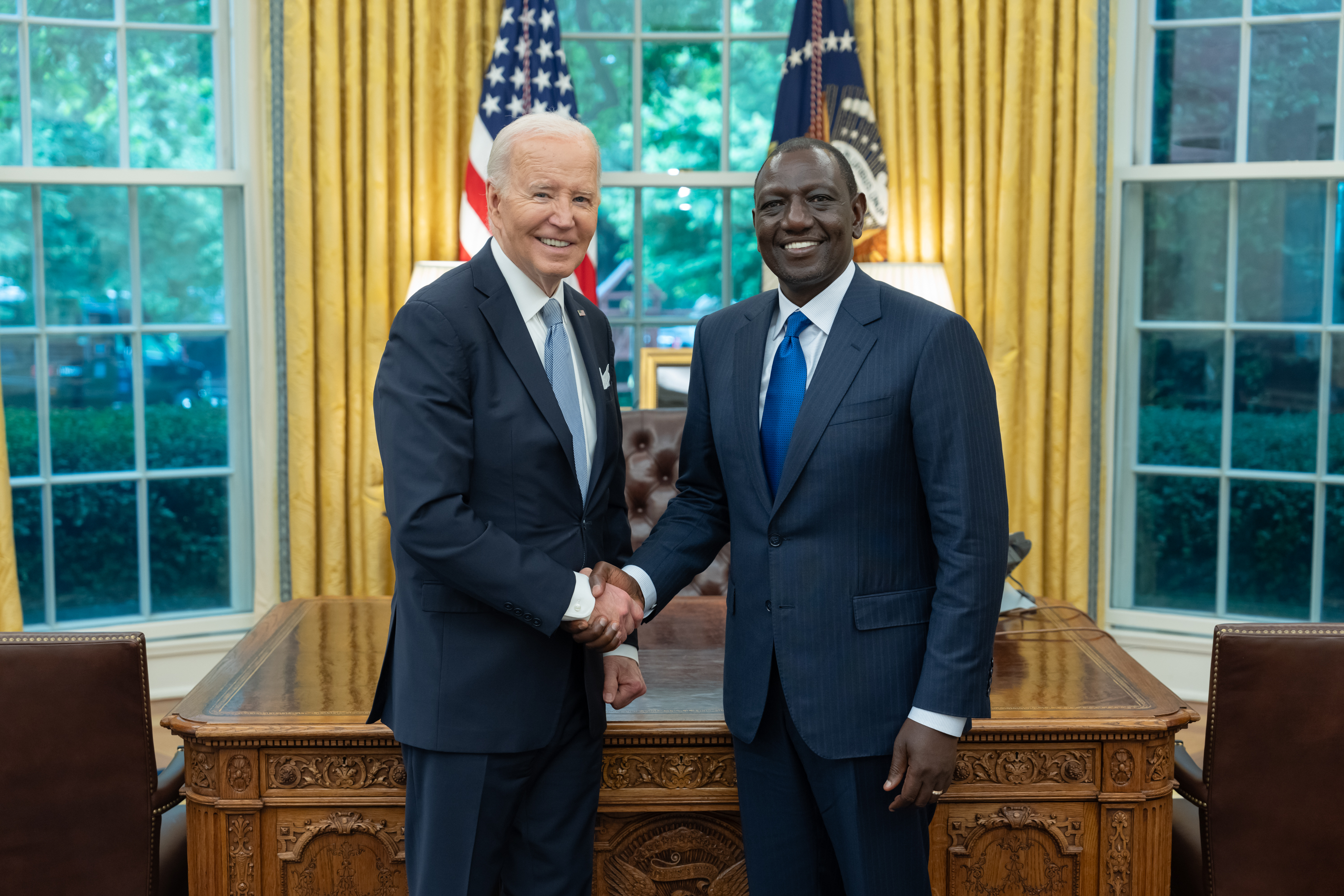
Ruto with U.S. President Joe Biden on 23 May 2024

On 13 September 2022 he was inaugurated at Moi International Sports Centre, Kasarani, in a ceremony presided over by Chief Justice Martha Koome, and attended by over 20 heads of state and government. The inauguration day was declared a public holiday. Attendance was huge, with groups of the general public clashing with security officials when trying to enter the stadium; however, the event continued peacefully. Following his inauguration he officially began his term as President of Kenya.

After taking office Ruto pledged to address climate change and end the use of fossil fuels in Kenya's electricity production by 2030.

On 18 September 2022 President Ruto made his first foreign trip as head of state to the United Kingdom, during which he attended the state funeral of the late Queen Elizabeth II on 19 September 2022 at Westminster Abbey in London.

Two days later, on 21 September 2022, President Ruto made his debut address as head of state to the United Nations General Assembly (UNGA) in New York. He nodded to President Biden's "Build Back Better" domestic plan, proposing a global effort toward "building back better from the bottom upward." The goal, he said, should be "including the marginalized, working majority in the economic mainstream." Other themes he addressed were the expansion of the representation of Africa on the U.N. Security Council, increased investment in the African continent, "moving Africa from aid to investment", tapping "the ever-bustling" human capital for economic prosperity and a concerted effort towards tackling climate change in the world.

In September 2022, he said that the Horn of Africa was experiencing its worst drought in 40 years, adding that "3.1 million people are facing severe drought" in Kenya alone.

Asked about the ongoing Tigray War in northern Ethiopia between government forces and Tigray rebels, Ruto said that "whatever happens in Ethiopia gets to Kenya".

Speaking about the Somali Civil War, he said that "Kenyan troops will come back home as soon as we're done with the assignment that we have in Somalia."

In November 2022 Ruto's government launched the Hustler Fund, a loan program to grant immediate loans to Kenyan citizens.

In 2023 Ruto proposed a large-scale privatisation of public enterprises, noting that it is not economically viable to keep pumping government resources into sustaining those corporations.

On 29 September 2023, Ruto joined the Advisory Board of the Global Center on Adaptation following the Africa Climate Summit in Nairobi, Kenya.

On 25 June 2024 at least five people were killed when public order broke down over tax protests. Ruto proposed several tax rises because more than half of its annual tax revenues are spent to service debt. The increased taxes are proposed "on everything from car ownership and financial transactions to sanitary pads."

Russian President Vladimir Putin welcoming Ruto and First Lady Rachel Ruto at the 2026 Russia–Africa Summit in Moscow

On 11 July Ruto sacked most of his cabinet save for the deputy president and prime cabinet secretary, and the next day the police chief Japhet Koome resigned after 40 people died over the past month in the Kenya Finance Bill protests. Koome was held responsible for police violence against protesters. It was noted that "[a]bout 60% of Kenya's collected revenues goes to servicing debt."

In September 2024, Ruto and German Chancellor Olaf Scholz signed an agreement that opened the German labor market to up to 250,000 skilled and semi-skilled migrant workers from Kenya. The agreement will also simplify the deportation of Kenyans from Germany. There are concerns about brain drain in Kenya, as professionals such as doctors and nurses could leave for better-paying jobs in Germany. The deal was made at a time when the anti-immigration AfD party is growing in popularity in Germany.

== Controversies ==
=== Weston Hotel land dispute ===
Since 2015, the Weston Hotel, a business associated with Ruto, has been the subject of a legal dispute regarding the acquisition of its 0.773-acre site opposite Wilson Airport. The Kenya Civil Aviation Authority (KCAA) alleged that the land was public property and was illegally excised in 2002. In January 2019, the National Land Commission (NLC) determined the allotment was irregular but recommended that Ruto compensate the KCAA at market value. Ruto subsequently stated he was a bona fide purchaser who had no knowledge of the original illegality. The matter moved to the High Court after the KCAA rejected the compensation offer, demanding the hotel's demolition.

==== KPC Ngong Forest land scandal ====
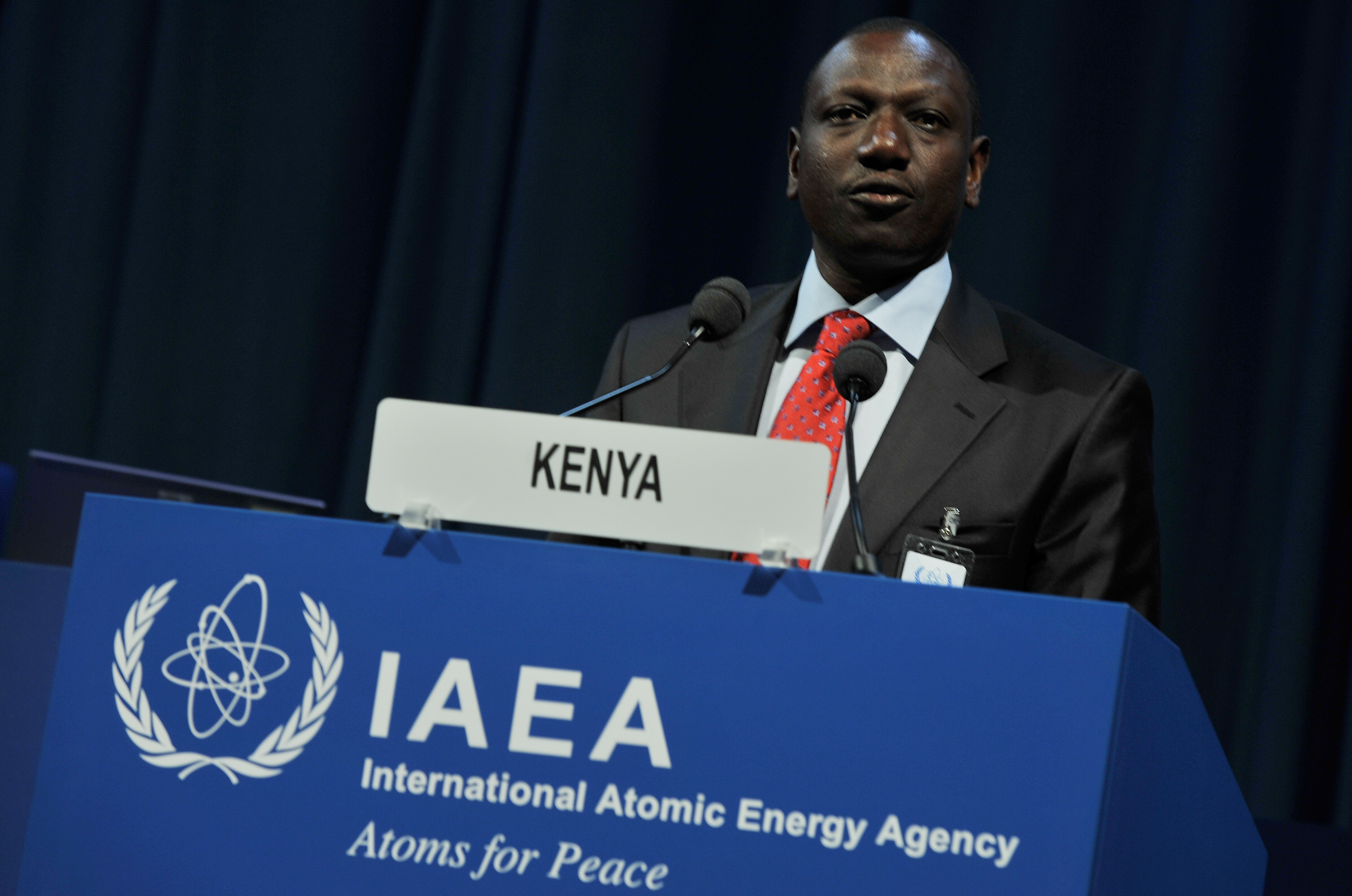
Ruto at the 54th Regular Session of the IAEA General Conference

In 2004, Ruto was charged with defrauding the Kenya Pipeline Company (KPC) of approximately Sh272 million through the sale of plots allegedly hived off from the Ngong Forest. Following a Constitutional Court ruling in 2010 that he must face trial, Ruto was suspended from his position as Minister for Higher Education. In April 2011, he was acquitted after the court found that the prosecution had failed to provide sufficient evidence that he or his co-accused received the funds from KPC.

In early 2020, the Directorate of Criminal Investigations (DCI) reopened the investigation to trace the money trail of the Sh272 million transaction. Ruto maintained that the renewed probe was politically motivated. Since his assumption of the presidency in 2022, no further charges have been brought forward in this matter, and the case remains part of his historical political discourse.

==== Muteshi land ====
In June 2013, a court ordered Ruto to pay a victim of 2007/08 post-election violence 5 million shillings for illegally taking away his land during the post-election violence. In the same judgement, Ruto was evicted from the grabbed land in Uasin Gishu. Adrian Muteshi had accused Ruto of grabbing and trespassing on his 100-acre piece of land in Uasin Gishu after he, Adrian, had fled his land for safety during the post-election violence of 2007/08. In February 2014, Ruto appealed the court order to pay the 5 million shilling fine. In 2017, Ruto withdrew the appeal against the judgment. In October 2020, Adrian Muteshi died at the age of 86.

==== Joseph Murumbi's 900 acres ====
In October 2019, the Daily Nation reported that Ruto's acquisition of a 900-acre piece of land of another former deputy president, Joseph Murumbi, haunted Ruto because he had been involved in the irregular acquisition of the land. In the same month, Ruto claimed that the articles were persistent, and obviously sponsored fake news. Later that month, a human rights lobby activist, Trusted Society of Human Rights Alliance, called for an investigation into the mysterious acquisition of a 900-acre piece of land that formerly belonged to former vice-president Murumbi. According to the allegations, Murumbi had been involved in a dispute over loan defaults with a state corporation, AFC, against the land that was pledged as a security for the loan. It is alleged that Murumbi defaulted the loan and AFC took over ownership of the land that was eventually sold to Ruto after he paid off the loan owed to the state corporation.

=== 2009 maize scandal ===
In February 2010, Ruto was suspended from his position as Agriculture Minister after his alleged involvement in the 2009 maize scandal that saw the country lose millions of shillings from fraudulent and irregular payments made for purchase of subsidized imported maize by business people and politicians. The then prime minister Raila Odinga termed Ruto's suspension necessary and which would allow for gathering of evidence to determine if any individuals should be prosecuted in these scandal, this was in line with a forensic audit done by PricewaterhouseCoopers (PwC) on the maize scandal.

=== Jacob Juma assassination ===
Ruto has been publicly linked by several opposition figures, activists, and media reports to the May 2016 assassination of Jacob Juma, a businessman and outspoken government critic. In the months preceding his death, Juma used social media to allege that Ruto was plotting to kill him, claiming in December 2015 that his assassination had been discussed by senior figures. Following Juma's fatal shooting along Ngong Road, former Lugari MP Cyrus Jirongo alleged during the memorial service that a personal rivalry existed between the two, claiming Juma had once physically assaulted Ruto. Jirongo further suggested that the same individuals involved in Juma's death were responsible for the murder of Meshack Yebei, a potential witness in Ruto's ICC trial.

President Ruto has consistently denied these allegations, characterizing them as politically motivated attacks intended to damage his reputation. He threatened to sue Jirongo and others for defamation, maintaining he never had physical contact with Juma. While Ruto expressed his willingness to record a statement with the Directorate of Criminal Investigations (DCI) if requested, the murder remains officially unsolved as of 2026, with no suspects charged in connection with the crime.

In June 2016, reports from the Financial Post detailed a dispute involving Pacific Wildcat, a Canadian mining company where Juma served as a director. Following the cancellation of the company's $2 billion niobium mining license in Kwale County by the Jubilee government, Juma alleged that then-Mining Minister Najib Balala had solicited a bribe to reinstate it. Company officials further alleged that Ruto and Balala had pressured the firm to transfer its license to a new entity in which the Kenyan government would hold a 50% stake for free. While Juma's opposition to the cancellation became a central theme of his social media activism and political correspondence, a High Court of Kenya ruling ultimately upheld the Minister's decision to revoke the license, finding that the cancellation was legally sound. Critics and media reports noted that the loss of these mining interests preceded Juma's transition into an outspoken critic of the administration's corruption, leading to various court filings and diplomatic petitions prior to his assassination.

=== Defamation case and Boniface Mwangi ===
In October 2016, Ruto filed a defamation suit against activist and photojournalist Boniface Mwangi after the latter posted a social media message linking him to the assassination of Jacob Juma. Ruto's legal team argued that the claims were malicious and intended to damage his reputation as a public officer.The case drew further attention in December 2016 when Douglas Nyakundi, an individual claiming to be an employee at the Office of the Deputy President, approached Mwangi alleging he had a confession detailing the planning of Juma's murder by persons within Ruto's office. Nyakundi was subsequently arrested and charged with attempted extortion, with police alleging he had demanded money from Mwangi in exchange for the information. During legal proceedings, the Directorate of Criminal Investigations (DCI) reported that Nyakundi had recanted his statement, claiming he had been coached to fabricate the allegations. The court subsequently ordered a mental evaluation for Nyakundi to determine his fitness to stand trial. As of 2026, the assassination of Jacob Juma remains officially unsolved.

=== International Criminal Court summons ===
In December 2010, the prosecutor of the International Criminal Court announced that he was seeking the summons of six people, including Ruto, over their involvement in the 2007–8 electoral violence. The ICC's Pre-Trial Chamber subsequently issued a summons for Ruto at the prosecutor's request. Ruto was accused of planning and organizing crimes against supporters of President Kibaki's Party of National Unity. He was charged with three counts of crimes against humanity, one for murder, one for the forcible transfer of population, and one for persecution. On 23 January 2012, the ICC confirmed the charges against Ruto and Joshua Sang, in a case that also involved former president Uhuru Kenyatta, Francis Muthaura, Henry Kosgey and Major General Mohammed Hussein Ali. Ruto told the US government that the Kiambaa church fire on 1 January 2008 after the 2007 general election was accidental. In 2009 the Waki Commission report stated that "the incident which captured the attention of both Kenyans and the world was a deliberate burning of live people, mostly Kikuyu women, and children huddled together in a church" in Kiambaa on 1 January 2008. In April 2016, the International Criminal Court abandoned the prosecution of Ruto, stating that rampant witness intimidation and "intolerable political interference" had made it impossible for the case to proceed. In the years leading up to the abandonment of the case, there were disappearances and murders of key witnesses in Ruto's ICC case, among them Meshack Yebei whose decomposing body was found at the Man Eater's Park in Tsavo, Voi in January 2015, and John Kituyi who was attacked and killed in cold blood by unknown assailants in April 2015. The murders and disappearances remain unresolved to date.

=== Home attack ===
On 28 July 2017, Ruto's home was targeted by at least one attacker armed with a machete, and the police officer on duty guarding the residence was injured. During the time of the attack, he and his family were not at the compound as he had left hours earlier for a campaign rally in Kitale. There were reports of gunfire and several security sources said the attack was staged by multiple people. Police initially thought there were a few attackers because the attacker used different firearms. Around 48 hours later, Kenya Police chief Joseph Boinnet announced that the attacker had been shot dead and the situation was under control.

=== OCCRP Person of the Year Award ===
In 2024, Ruto received a record-breaking 40,000 public nominations for the OCCRP Person of the Year award. The organization attributed the surge to intense domestic dissatisfaction following the 2024 Finance Bill protests and general economic frustration. However, OCCRP's final panel of investigative journalists did not award Ruto the title, clarifying that in many cases, public nominations lacked direct evidence of significant corruption or a longstanding pattern of abuses required for their selection. The panel ultimately selected ousted Syrian President Bashar al-Assad, citing his documented role in state-sponsored drug trafficking and human rights violations. Separate from the OCCRP report, an August 2018 survey by Ipsos Kenya released its Social, Political, Economic and Cultural (SPEC) Survey, which found that 33% of 2,016 respondents perceived Ruto, then Deputy President under Uhuru Kenyatta, as the most corrupt political leader among those currently or previously in office. Anne Waiguru, then Governor of Kirinyaga, was ranked second by 31% of respondents.

Ruto and his supporters strongly dismissed the poll, with his press secretary labeling it a "libellous crusade" by "shadowy sponsors" intended to influence the 2022 general election. Ruto further characterized the findings as "fake news" and "propaganda". Similarly, Waiguru threatened legal action for defamation, noting she had never been charged or convicted of corruption in a court of law. Critics of the survey argued that perception-based polls measure public opinion rather than providing factual evidence of criminal activity.

=== 2025 State banquet controversy ===
On the evening of 18 March, Ruto and First Lady Rachel Ruto hosted a state banquet at State House in Nairobi in honor of King Willem-Alexander and Queen Máxima of the Netherlands. After finishing his opening speech President Ruto, contrary to protocol, then introduced Patrick V. Verkooijen, the Dutch chancellor of the University of Nairobi, as a surprise speaker rather than acknowledging his guest, the Dutch king, who was visibly surprised. Verkooijen then proceeded to give a 7.5 minute speech in which he extolled the accomplishments of Ruto, drawing criticism from the royal delegation.

=== Church-building ===
In July 2025, President Ruto announced that he would build a church on the grounds of State House, Nairobi using his own funds. The decision was widely criticised, with the Atheists In Kenya Society threatening to sue over what it called "a promotion of Christian nationalism", and Nairobi's Catholic archbishop Philip Anyolo urging a clarification on whether the proposal would favour certain denominations. The Daily Nation also published what is said were architectural designs for the structure, showing a large building with stained glass windows and capacity for 8,000 people, and said that it would be expected to cost $9 million, while raising concern over whether it would violate the secular principles enshrined within the Kenyan constitution.

=== Adani Group involvements ===
In June 2024, a University student, Nelson Amenya, blew the whistle on a deal that was underway between the government and Adani Group to lease Kenya's largest International Airport, JKIA. Many Kenyans criticized this deal on the internet for not following the correct privatization procedure such as having public participation on the matter as required by law. The secret manner in which the deal was being conducted also made many Kenyans suspicious of the disregard of transparency. The president on numerous occasions refuted the claims that the airport was being sold, he added the deal was crucial for national development and for the modernization of JKIA. Adani was also involved with the Energy sector in Kenya and had signed power transmission deals with the government aimed at increasing power transmission and rural electrification in the country. The deal was valued at $736 million. Kenya's high court suspended the power deal. The court said the government could not move ahead with the 30-year agreement with Adani Energy Solutions until the court makes a determination on a case brought by Law Society of Kenya challenging the deal. In the same month Ruto reaffirmed that the country stands to gain significantly from the power transmission deal between Adani Group Holdings. On 21 November 2024 in a nation address, Ruto cancelled the Adani deals, which were valued at over $2.5 billion, after Adani was indicted by the US for corruption and bribery allegations. The news received positive reactions from lawmakers.

=== Role in the Sudan conflict ===
In 2024 and 2025, the Ruto administration faced international and domestic scrutiny regarding its role in the Sudanese civil war. Following a February 2024 meeting between Ruto and RSF leader Mohamed Hamdan Dagalo, reports from investigative outlets like NTV and Bellingcat identified Kenyan-labeled military crates in Sudanese depots. Further allegations, highlighted by organizations such as SwissAid, suggested that Nairobi served as a transit hub for gold smuggled from RSF-controlled territories to Dubai. Sudanese officials and domestic critics alleged these ventures provided a financial and logistical backbone for the RSF, though the Kenyan government consistently denied direct involvement in the illicit trade.

Diplomatic tensions peaked in February 2025 after Kenya hosted the signing of a charter by the RSF and its allies to form a parallel government in Sudan. While the Sudanese military-led government condemned the move as "diplomatic anarchy" and an infringement on its sovereignty, President Ruto maintained that Kenya's involvement was strictly as a neutral mediator. Government spokesperson Isaac Mwaura affirmed that Kenya remained committed to IGAD-led peace negotiations and humanitarian relief, framing the hosting of various Sudanese factions as a necessary step toward ending the conflict and restoring civilian rule.

=== Privatization of state-owned entities ===
On 9 October 2023, Ruto signed the Privatisation Bill 2023 into law, which gives the country's Ministry of National Treasury and Economic Planning powers to privatise public-owned enterprises without seeking approval from Parliament. Under the new law in place, privatisation of public entities will be done through initial public offering of shares, sale of shares by public tender, sale resulting from the exercise of pre-emptive rights or through any other method that will be defined by the Cabinet. This has been termed unconstitutional by civil societies and groups. The groups reiterated that the process is illegal and amounts to a material breach of procedure, having not gone through parliamentary ratification, stakeholder engagement and public participation contrary to sections 21,22 and 23 of the Privatisation Act, 2023, terming it null and void. There have also been fears for job losses should some entities get privatised. MPs have also raised their concern on how valuation has been carried out with some claiming entities have been undervalued, also questioning the transparency and legality of the entire process. . He has since defended this move terming it necessary as it lessens fiscal burden from the state thus cutting government expenditure and that will also raise revenue in addition to fighting corruption. This was also defended by the then Treasury CS Njuguna Ndung'u. Over 10 state parastatals have been up for privatisation, including KICC, JKIA, Kenya Seed Company, National Oil Corporation of Kenya, Kenya Literature Bureau, with Kenya Pipeline Company being privatised later in 2025.

== Personal life ==
Ruto is married to Rachel Chebet. They first lived in Dagoretti, where they had their first child. They were married in 1991 at the Africa Inland Church. They currently have six children.

Ruto is an evangelical Christian and a member of the Africa Inland Church.

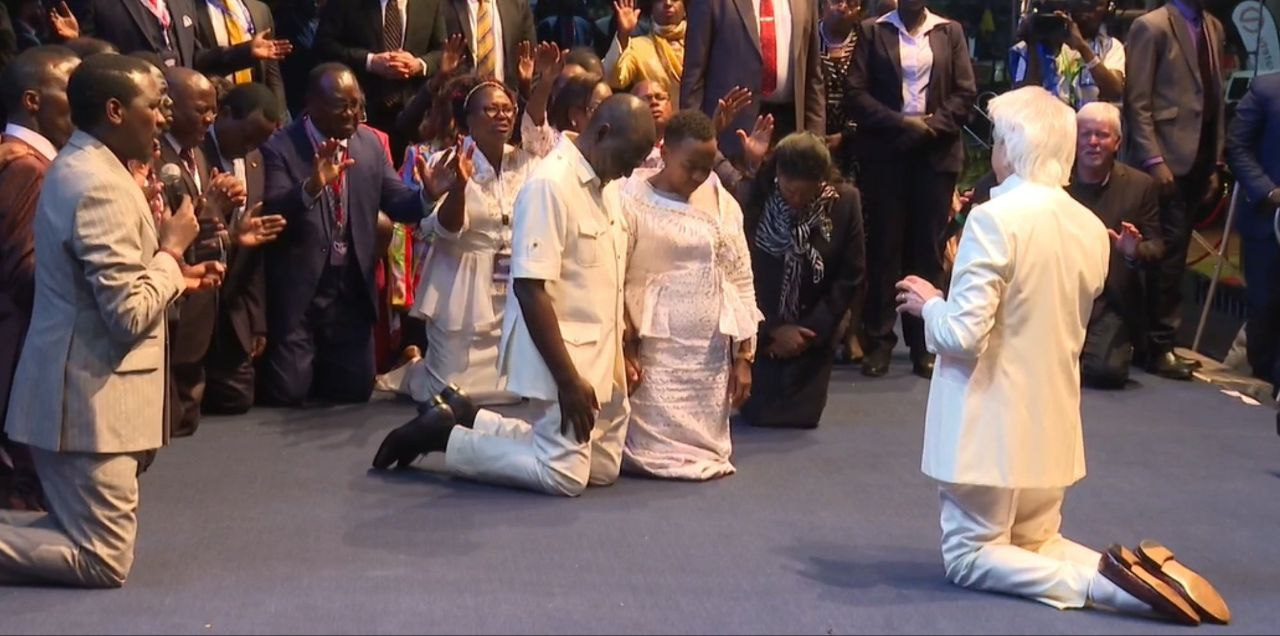
Ruto and his wife at Benny Hinn's crusade in Kenya

Ruto owns a chicken farm in his home village of Sugoi, which was originally inspired by his stint as a chicken hawker on the Nairobi-Eldoret-Malaba highway. Ruto and his wife built a chapel in their compound at their residence in the Karen suburb of Nairobi.

== Honours and awards ==
| Year | Country | Order / Decoration |
|---|---|---|
| 2013 | Kenya | Elder of the Order of the Golden Heart (E.G.H.) |
| 2022 | Kenya | Chief of the Order of the Golden Heart (C.G.H.) |
| 2023 | Comoros | Order of the Green Crescent of the Comoros (Grand Cross) |
| 2024 | Guinea-Bissau | Amílcar Cabral Medal |

=== Other recognition ===
- 2022: Golden Plate Award, American Academy of Achievement
- 2023: African Leader of the Year, African Leadership Magazine
- 2024: Outstanding Leaders Award, U.S. Chamber of Commerce
- 2024: Global Award for Climate Action, NDC Investment Awards
- 2024: Outstanding Achievement Award, Confédération Africaine de Football (CAF)

== See also ==
- Presidency of William Ruto
- List of heads of state of Kenya
- 2022 Kenyan general election
- List of current heads of state and government
- List of heads of the executive by approval rating

National Assembly (Kenya)
| Preceded by Reuben Chesire | Member of Parliament for Eldoret North; 1998–2013 | Constituency abolished |
Political offices
| Preceded by George Saitoti | Minister of Home Affairs; 2002 | Succeeded by Moody Awori |
| Preceded by Kipruto Rono Arap Kirwa | Minister of Agriculture; 2008–2010 | Succeeded by Margret Nyambura |
| Preceded by Kalonzo Musyoka as Vice President of Kenya | Deputy President of Kenya; 2013–2022 | Succeeded by Rigathi Gachagua |
| Preceded by Uhuru Kenyatta | President of Kenya; 2022–present | Incumbent |
Party political offices
| New alliance | Jubilee Alliance nominee for Deputy President of Kenya; 2013 | Alliance dissolved |
| New political party | Jubilee Party nominee for Deputy President of Kenya; Aug. 2017, Oct. 2017 | Succeeded by Martha Karua |
| New political party | UDA nominee for President of Kenya; 2022 | Most recent |
| New alliance | Kenya Kwanza nominee for President of Kenya; 2022 | Most recent |
