= Idah Nabayiga =

Ugandan politician

Hon. Idah Nabayiga

District Woman Representative for Kalangala District
- Incumbent
- Assumed office 2016

Personal details
- Born: November 14, 1979 (age 47) Kalangala District, Uganda
- Party: National Resistance Movement (NRM)
- Education: Makerere University; Uganda Management Institute; Law Development Centre
- Occupation: Politician, Teacher
- Profession: Community Development Officer, Human Resource Officer
- Known for: Opposition to Mobile Money Tax and Presidential Age Limit Bill
- Committees: Committee on Education and Sports

Idah Nabayiga (born 14 November 1979) is a Ugandan politician and was the District Woman Representative for Kalangala District in Uganda's 10th Parliament. Nabayiga lost her parliamentary seat in the 11th parliament to the late Hellen Nakimuli (NUP) in 2021 and 2026 but later returned to the August house in June 2026 after a bye-election. She is a member of the National Resistance Movement on whose ticket she ran in the 2016,2021, and 2026 general elections.

== Background ==
Idah Nabayiga was born in Kalangala District

== Education ==
Idah Nabayiga attended Memere Primary School . In 1994, she joined St. Henry's Buyege Secondary School for both her O and A levels . She later joined Makerere University in 2003 for a Bachelor of Arts degree. Idah Nabayiga also holds a Certificate in Administrative law obtained from Uganda's Law Development Centre in 2008. in 2011, she obtained a Postgraduate diploma in Human Resource Management from the Uganda Management Institute. Currently, she is pursuing a Master of Public Administration and Management still at Uganda Management Institute.

== Career ==
Before joining representative politics, Idah Nabayiga worked as a Community development Officer under Kalangala District Local Government between 2006 and 2012. Later on, between 2012 and 2015, she served as a Human Resource Officer still under the same administration. Idah Nabayiga trained as a teacher and in Uganda's 10th Parliament, she served on the Education and Sports Committee.

After losing the Kalangala district woman representative seat to Hellen Nakimuli in the 2021 and 2026 General elections, Nabayiga stayed out of the August house but later reclaimed the seat in a bye-election that came as a result of the death of Hellen Nakimuli who was the Kalangala woman MP elect for the 12th Parliament of Uganda. Her return to Parliament was confirmed after she defeated four other contestants in the 24th June 2026 polls that were carried out in kalangala. Among the people she defeated was Irene Nampala of the opposition National Unity Platform a sister to the late Nakimuli and two other independent candidates.

== Controversy and activism ==
Idah Nabayiga was cited as one of the National Resistance Movement MPs who defied President Yoweri Kaguta Museveni on the Mobile money Tax in 2018

A newspaper poll in 2017, listed Idah Nabayiga as one of the Members' of Parliament who had voted in support of the lifting of the Presidential Age Limit Bill. She reportedly declined the vote because of a possible fear of lynching by her electorate.

She has also been on record as having rejected the Uganda Government's denial of the Uganda People's Defence Force brutality against fishing communities on Lake Victoria.

== Personal life ==
Idah Nabayiga is married.

In 2016, she survived a motor accident when a car in which she was travelling overturned
