= Kianda School =

Private Catholic girls' day school in Nairobi

Coordinates: 1°15′55″S 36°45′28″E

- Waiyaki Way/Kabasiran Avenue; Nairobi (Westlands); Kenya

Information
- Type: Private, all-female, day school
- Motto: In Opere et Veritate (In Deed and in Truth)
- Religious affiliation: Roman Catholic
- Patron saint: Saint Josemaría Escrivá
- Established: 1977
- Founder: Olga Marlin
- Principal: Juliana Murage
- Classes: Std 1-8; Form 1–4
- Education system: 8-4-4 / Kenyan system
- Affiliation: Opus Dei
- Website: www.kiandaschool.ac.ke

Kianda School is a private, all-girls day school with a Catholic ethos located in the Westlands area of Nairobi, Kenya. The school was opened in 1977 by The Kianda Foundation, a non-profit organisation that aims to better Kenyan women's lives through education and Christian values. The school began with 40 students but has now grown to a student body of about 830 in both its primary and secondary school sections.

== Logo and motto ==
The school logo consists of a palm tree to symbolise tropical Africa, a deep valley, which is the meaning of the word "Kianda" in several Bantu languages, and a glowing fire to symbolise a hearth, a symbol of the warmth a woman brings to the home and to society.

The school motto is In Opere et Veritate, Latin for "In deed and in truth". The motto was inspired by the Bible verse 1 John 3:18, which says: " My little children, let us not love in word, neither in tongue; but in deed and in truth."

== Academics ==
Kianda School is consistently ranked as one of the best performing schools in the Kenya Certificate of Secondary Education (K.C.S.E) exam. Subjects offered at Kianda School are: Mathematics, English, Kiswahili, Biology, Chemistry, Physics, Home Science, Computer Studies, French, Business Studies, Geography, and History and Government.

In the KCSE exam of 2010, Kianda School was ranked 13th nationally and 4th in the private schools category with an average grade of B+. It was ranked 4th place nationally in English (Av. 11.09, A−), 5th nationally in Mathematics (Av. 10.49, B+), 8th nationally in Biology (Av. 10.43, B+) and 8th nationally in Physics (Av. 10.48, B+).

== Admissions and school fees ==
=== Primary School admissions ===
For admission to the primary school, the parents of the prospective pupil write a letter of application to the school, enclosing the child's birth certificate and a letter of recommendation from the head teacher of the child's nursery school.

=== Secondary School admissions ===
For admission to the secondary school, the parents of the prospective student write a letter of application to the school, with the results of the student's mock Kenya Certificate of Primary Education (K.C.P.E) exam as well as a letter of recommendation from the head teacher of the primary school. The prospective student must then sit the Kianda Entrance Test (K.E.T) and be interviewed before the decision of admittance is made.

=== School fees ===
The basic school fees ranges from Ksh.73,000 to Ksh. 95,000 per term. There are three terms in the school year. The fees caters for tuition, books and school uniform. Additional costs include lunch, transport and music lessons.

=== Bursaries ===
About 10% of the students at Kianda School receive full or partial scholarships. This ensures that no qualified student is barred from attending the school due to financial constraints. The school's Scholarship Fund has increased its endowment to better assist students who require financial aid.

== Student life ==
Emphasis is placed not only on academics but also on spiritual life, fitness and character building. Kianda School offers daily Mass, weekly meditations and annual spiritual retreats for its students. Inspired by the spirit of Opus Dei, the offering up of various aspects of daily life to God is encouraged. The annual spiritual retreats and daily mass are optional.

The tutorial system: the school considers the parents to be the primary educators. For this reason, staff and parents work together through the tutorial system, a key feature of the school. Through this system, every student has a tutor -a mentor-who gives personal guidance in all areas of her formation. The tutor maintains close contact with the parents. The tutorial system allows for greater parental involvement. Parents can contribute actively in their daughter's education, and by so doing, help to forge her character. Together with the tutor they try to bring out the best in every girl.

There are clubs and sports in which the students can take part. The clubs include Journalism, Wildlife, Home-makers, Law, Choir, Public Speaking, First-Aid, French, Kiswahili and Math & Tax. The school offers sports such as basketball, hockey, squash, swimming, taekwondo and tennis. Community service is a part of student life, and is usually done during the school holidays.

== Traditions ==
Kianda School has a school song and a school hymn, both of which were written by students.

Discipline is maintained by a merit-demerit system. Good deeds earn merits, while wrong ones earn demerits. An accumulation of more than five demerits a week results in detention.

In the primary school, failure to do assignments earns the student a demerit. Accumulation of 3 demerits earns a detention. However, a teacher can choose to give a student more than one demerit for a single assignment and students who appear to be rude earn a direct detention. Three detentions in a term earn a suspension. Any form of violence earns a suspension.

The Kianda School student council is called the Class Council. There is a Class Council for each class composed of four students. Students vote for the Class Council but it is ultimately the teachers and the Section Committee that decide who the Class Council members will be.

There are four school houses: Green, Yellow House, Red and Blue. Each house has a house mistress and a captain, usually a Form Four student, and an assistant captain, usually a Form Three student. The captain and her assistant are voted in annually by the teachers. The houses compete in sports, merits and demerits, and other aspects of school life. The winning house is announced at the end of the year and gets to go on a special trip while the other houses remain in school.

There are four major events in the school each year: the Family Sports Day in the second term, the Creative Arts Variety Show and Kianda Awards Days in the third term, and the annual Christmas Concert.

== Notable alumni ==
- Margaret Kenyatta, First Lady of the Republic of Kenya

== See also ==
- The Roman Catholic Church
- Opus Dei
- Strathmore School
- Olga Marlin
