= First Lady of Kenya =

Wife of the President of Kenya

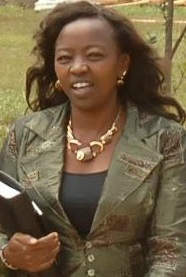
- Incumbent; Rachel Ruto since 13 September 2022
- Residence: State House
- Inaugural holder: Ngina Kenyatta
- Formation: 12 December 1964
- Website: Office of the First Lady of Kenya

The First Lady of Kenya is the title and role held by the wife of the president of Kenya. Kenya has had five first ladies since the independence in 1964. The modern role of the First Lady of Kenya not only supports the president, but wields influence publicly and behind-the-scenes.

The country's present first lady is Rachel Ruto, wife of President William Ruto, who took office on 13 September 2022.

== History and role ==
Traditionally, the First Lady of Kenya performed social and diplomatic functions, such as holding State House social events and hosting official guests. In recent decades, an official Office of the First Lady was established, with a state budget and staff, leading to a much more influential role in Kenyan politics.

While the role of First Lady has been in existence since Ngina Kenyatta became the country's inaugural first lady at independence in 1964, it is not in the Constitution of Kenya. This has brought it under fire from opponents for having funding despite being unconstitutional. President William Ruto pulled funding from the office after a public outcry.

== First ladies of Kenya ==
| No | Name | Term Began | Term Ended | President of Kenya | Notes |
|---|---|---|---|---|---|
| 1 | Ngina Kenyatta | 12 December 1964 | 22 August 1978 | Jomo Kenyatta | Popularly known as "Mama Ngìna", she is also the mother of former President Uhuru Kenyatta. |
| 2 | Lena Moi | 22 August 1978 | 30 December 2002 | Daniel arap Moi | Lena Moi and her husband, Daniel arap Moi, separated in 1974, but she is recognized as Kenya's second First Lady during his presidency.. Lena Moi died on 22 July 2004. |
| 3 | Lucy Kibaki | 30 December 2002 | 9 April 2013 | Mwai Kibaki | In April 2016, former First Lady Lucy Kibaki died while undergoing treatment in London, United Kingdom. |
| 4 | Margaret Kenyatta | 9 April 2013 | 13 September 2022 | Uhuru Kenyatta | |
| 5 | Rachel Ruto | 13 September 2022 | Incumbent | William Ruto | |

== See also ==
- President of Kenya
