= Atheists In Kenya Society =

Kenyan irreligious association

- Atheists In Kenya Society
- Abbreviation: AIK
- Formation: February 17, 2016; 10 years ago
- Founder: Harrison Mumia
- Type: Nonprofit
- Registration no.: 47958
- Purpose: To promote the growth and interaction of atheists in Kenya
- Headquarters: Summit House, Moi Avenue, Nairobi
- Location(s): Nairobi, Kenya
- Coordinates: 1.287469577828723°S 36.82617528620991°E
- Region served: Kenya
- President: Harrison Mumia
- Vice President: Hellen Kathure
- Secretary: Michelle Nekesa
- Treasurer: Samson Mbavu
- Main organ: Executive Committee
- Affiliations: Humanists International
- Website: atheistsinkenya.org

The Atheists In Kenya Society is an atheist organization, registered under the Societies Act in Kenya. It is the first non-religious society to be registered in the country.

The national goal of the Atheists In Kenya Society is twofold — separation of church and state and to offer support to those who are like-minded (including agnostics, skeptics, humanists, free thinkers, skeptics, and spiritualists) and know they are not alone in a country where the majority have a religion. The Atheists In Kenya Society is a member organization of Humanists International.

The society was established in Nairobi, Kenya, on February 17, 2016. Harrison Mumia is the founder and president. The foundation has its headquarters in Summit House, Nairobi.

== History ==
In 2013, a group of Kenyans met with the aim of establishing a nonreligious society. They held informal meetings in various restaurants in Nairobi and used social media, especially Facebook, to connect with like-minded Kenyans. This group included Ssemakula Mukiibi, Zack Wanambwa, Elizabeth Wangari and Ellen Mical. In 2015, they applied for registration, which was first rejected by the Deputy Registrar of Societies in Kenya.

On February 17, 2016, the Kenyan government issued Mumia with a certificate for the organization under Societies Act, Cap. 108.

In 2016, April, the society's registration was suspended by the then Attorney General, Githu Muigai, due to pressure from the Kenya National Congress of Pentecostal Churches, who claimed the establishment of the group threatened the public peace. Mumia then took the case to the High Court of Kenya, where he challenged the suspension.

In 2018, the High Court of Kenya quashed the suspension and had the society reinstated.

In 2023, Kenya’s first atheist group was battling to keep legal recognition in a case filed by a Christian bishop seeking to suspend its registration.

== Aims ==
The objects of the society are:

1. To promote and practice the open, rational, and scientific examination of the universe and our place in it.
2. To advocate that ethics and morality be meaningfully based on rational and humanistic ideals and values.
3. To promote skeptical inquiry.
4. To provide community for atheists.
5. To organize activities, such as forums for discussion, guest speakers and debates.
6. To foster public acceptance of atheists in Kenya.
7. To engage in social issues affecting its membership and the wider community.

== Activism ==
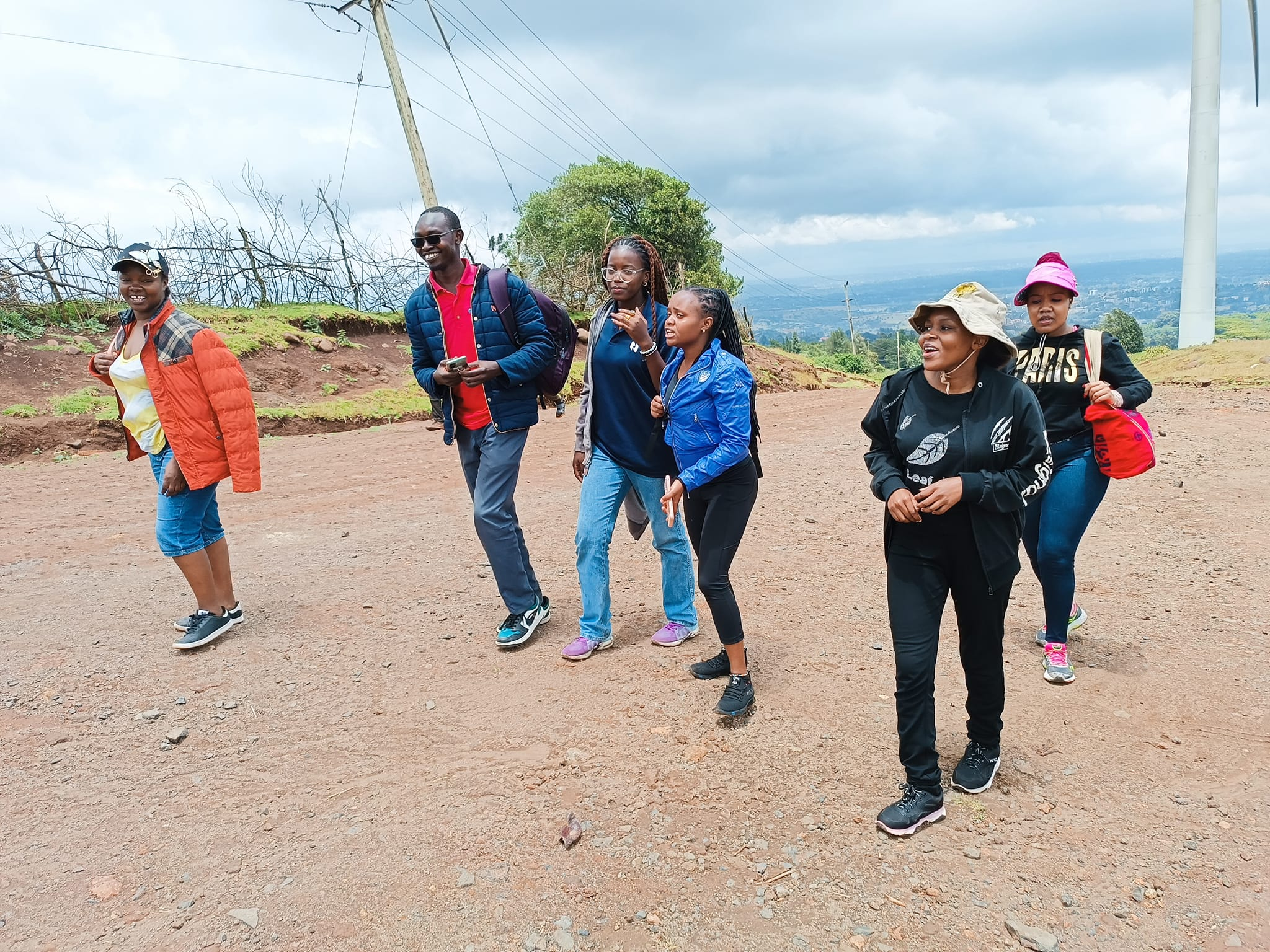
Atheists hiking event at Ngong Hills, Kenya 24th February, 2024.

In 2015, the group called for the passage of laws that would prohibit street preachers from spreading the faith in public places, including matatus.
In 2016, AIK wrote to the Commissioner-General of the Kenya Revenue Authority, John Njiraini, demanding that churches not be exempt from taxes.
In 2020, the society, through its president, Mumia, paid school fees for one of the top students in 2019 KCPE from Baringo County.
The Association has also pursued several campaigns in court to advocate for the scrapping of religious education in Kenyan's basic education curriculum.
They have also lobbied for February 17 to be declared as an atheist national holiday.

In 2022, the group called on political parties and politicians sign a declaration stating they will respect and not discriminate against anybody on the basis of their religion or lack of one.

== The Executive Committee ==
The Executive Committee since December 16, 2021:

- Harrison Mumia – President
- Hellen Kathure – Vice President
- Michelle Nekesa – Secretary
- Samson Mbavu – Treasurer
- Kenny Githungo – Assistant Treasurer
- Rebecca Sarange – Assistant Secretary

== See also ==
- Irreligion in Kenya
- Major religious groups
- List of secularist organizations.
- Religion in Kenya
