= Ministry of Agriculture (Kenya) =

Government ministry of Kenya

The Ministry of Agriculture, Livestock and Fisheries or simply the Ministry of Agriculture (MOA or MoA) is a government ministry of Kenya. Its head office is in the Kilimo House in Nairobi.

== List of ministers of agriculture ==
- Michael Blundell (1955–1959)
- Bruce Mackenzie (1959–1961)
- Michael Blundell (1961–1962)
- Bruce Mackenzie (1963–1970)*
  - Agriculture and Animal Husbandry (1965 Reappointment)
  - Agriculture and Animal Husbandry (1966 Reappointment)
- Jeremiah J.M. Nyagah (1971–1979)
- Gilbert Kabere M'mbijiwe (1980–1982)
- Munyua Waiyaki (1982–1984)
- William Odongo Omamo (1984–1987)
- Elijah Mwangale (1987–1992)
- Simeon Nyachae (1993–1996)
- Darius Msagha Mbela (1997)
- Musalia Mudavadi (1998)
- Christopher Obure (1999–2001)
- Bonaya Godana (2001–2002)
- Kipruto Rono Arap Kirwa (2003–2007)
- William Ruto (2008–2010)
- Sally Kosgei (2010–2013)
- Felix Koskei (2013–2014)
- Willy Bett (2014–2017)
- Mwangi Kiunjuri (2017–2019)
- Peter Munya (2019–2022)
- Mithika Linturi (2022-2024)
- Dr. Andrew Karanja (2024 -2025)
- Mutahi Kagwe (2025 -Present)

== Agencies ==
- Kenya Agricultural & Livestock Research Organization (KALRO)
- Veterinary Medicines Directorate Veterinary Medicines Directorate

== See also ==
- Agriculture in Kenya
  - Coffee Industry of Kenya
  - Poultry farming in Kenya
  - Tea Production in Kenya
- Kenya
  - Ministry of Foreign Affairs (Kenya)
  - Heads of State of Kenya
  - Heads of Government of Kenya
  - Vice-Presidents of Kenya
  - Colonial Heads of Kenya
- Lists of office-holders
