= Sauri Millennium Village =

Group of villages in western Kenya

Sauri is an eleven-village conglomerate located in the former Nyanza Province of western Kenya and was the first and largest of the fourteen Millennium Village Project (MVP) demonstration sites that ran from 2005 to 2015 in sub-Saharan Africa. The aim of the MVP in Sauri was to halve extreme poverty of villagers living below US$1 between 2000 and 2015. The overarching goal was achieving sustainable development through progress in public health, education, infrastructure, and agricultural productivity.

The experiment in Sauri aimed to provide further learnings for Kenya's Ministry of State of Planning, National Development (MPND) to replicate development initiatives in eight other Kenyan districts. As well, the lessons would help develop a more comprehensive plan for the Kenya Vision 2030 for Macro-economic Growth (KV2030), which is the Kenyan government's commitment to realize the Millennium Development Goals and the elimination of poverty by 2030.

Although Kenya adopted integrated rural development (IRD) approaches to target economic growth and poverty since the 1970s, close to eighty percent of the Sauri population lived below the US$1 a day poverty line in 2004 (prior to the adoption of the MVP). Sauri was first chosen due to its high incidence of poverty and hunger. Some of the initial MVP interventions were increasing food production, controlling malaria, constructing a functional clinic and safe drinking water points, and building community capacity.

The Sauri Millennium Village Project (SMVP) began in December 2004 with an annual investment of US$2.75 million, which was a record-breaking monetary amount used to alleviate poverty in an African community of its small size. Jeffrey Sachs, the MVP founder, described Sauri as a village "that's going to make history" and "to end extreme poverty" in The Diary of Angelina Jolie and Dr. Jeffrey Sachs in Africa, a 2005 MTV documentary. The degree of success or failure found in the SMVP is considered a defining turning point in the development debate – in determining whether developed countries should invest more or reduce foreign development aid.

This project's success is under intense scrutiny within Kenya. It is widely known that the MVP has shown short-term results in helping Sauri establish agricultural, educational, and health programmes, and attracting other financial and infrastructural investments from other NGOs. On the other hand, it is argued that these programs lack long-term sustainability, undermine the complexity of poverty, create new yet confusing power structures, and lack clear exit strategies. These issues further challenge the longevity of development in Sauri and pose potentially problematic implications.

== Background ==
Sauri is located in the Siaya County about 50 kilometers north of the third largest city of Kisumu in Kenya. The county itself is situated in the former Nyanza Province, in western Kenya. SMVP is a conglomeration of 11 villages covering a 132 square kilometer area, and consists of a population of approximately 60,000 people. The Luo are the dominant ethnic group in the area and speak the Dholuo language.

The climate is tropical and humid throughout the year in the region. Sauri has a bimodal rainfall pattern with the long rains season from March to June and the short rains from September to December. Water sources in Sauri include protected and unprotected springs, shallow wells, piped water and rainwater harvesting.

Agriculture is the primary livelihood for residents, with maize, beans, sorghum, and cassava being the most common crops grown in the region. Cotton and tobacco are also harvested as the two main cash crops. Most livelihood activities that locals engage in are pertinent to poverty alleviation. Beyond subsistence farming, residents also rely on remittances sent from people living and working outside the village. Due to the challenging climate and limited availability of land, Sauri is often subject to low crop yields, which is a major cause for food shortage and undernutrition. At the initiation of the MVP, there was a high prevalence of degraded soils resulting from years of nutrient depletion that occurred because farmers could not afford fertilizers. Poor soil conditions further perpetuated low crop yields.

Prior to the establishment of the Millennium Village, initial assessments of the district reveal heavy disease burdens in terms of malaria, tuberculosis, HIV infection, high levels of malnutrition, respiratory and diarrheal diseases. There were limited antimalarial bed nets available and food was generally cooked indoors over fires. In terms of education, there are three primary schools and one secondary school near the western border of Sauri.

== Poverty initiatives and implementations ==
=== Poverty and aid initiatives in rural Kenya ===
Siaya County in western Kenya has a long history of financial aid initiatives. Nyanza Province has been the focus of Kenyan integrated rural development (IRD) approaches since the 1970s, as it is one of the three most impoverished districts of the country. Poor infrastructure, low productivity, and infectious diseases impede poverty alleviation despite efforts from the Kenyan government to promote economic development. Programs such as the District Focus for Rural Development (DFRD) and the Constituency Development Fund (CDF) were introduced in 1983 and 2003, respectively, to support grassroots participation in the implementation of economic development.. International non-governmental organizations began assistance programs in Sauri in the 1990s. Among others, Heifer International and CARE Kenya worked with the International Centre for Research in Agroforestry (ICRAF) and the semi-autonomous government organization Kenya Agricultural Research Institute (KARI) to assist in poverty alleviation. In collaboration, local, national, and international non-governmental initiatives provided assistance in agriculture, disease-control, and poverty reduction.

=== Goals ===
As the first and largest Millennium Village, implementations in Sauri began in December 2004. To overcome the self-perpetuating factors of extreme poverty, the MVP provided the population of Sauri with $120 per person annually. $30 were supplied by the Kenyan government, while $60 came directly from the MVP and $20 from other NGOs. An additional $10 were contributions from the village through redistribution programs such as the school feeding projects.

The goal of the MVP was to improve four target areas of agricultural productivity, health, education and infrastructure through multiple, simultaneous interventions in two phases.

During the first phase, a baseline evaluation of Sauri was made and local leadership structures were established to engage the community in the four target areas. The second phase put an emphasis on commercialization and connecting Sauri to local market structures.

==== Agriculture ====
Maize-based subsistence farming is the primary economic activity in Sauri. In 2005, the first year of the project, fertilizer and high-yield seeds were introduced to increase the output of maize. With support of the Kenyan NGOs, SACRED Africa, and the Teso District-Akkuranut Development Trust, the Kenyan Ministry of Agriculture directly provided training in improved agriculture techniques prior to planting to the people of Sauri. While the MVP provided all inputs in 2005, inputs were subsidized by 50% in 2006. For the remaining years, the MVP did not provide subsidies, but helped Sauri farmers obtain finance and loan opportunities. In order to gain access to markets and generate income, a cereal bank was established to store the produce. From 2006 onwards, additional training in the diversification of crops and various agricultural projects, such as dairy goat farming, beekeeping, and fish farming were sponsored by the MVP.

==== Education ====
Through school feeding programs and free education, the MVP sought to increase primary school attendance. All primary schools in the Sauri cluster became part of the school meals program, an initiative based on yield donations from local farmers who were required to donate 10% of their produce to schools in exchange for subsidized seeds and fertilizers. Other interventions included the construction of primary and secondary schools, new classrooms and the improvement of school infrastructure, electricity and the access to safe drinking water. Educational teacher trainings were provided by local libraries and Teacher Training Colleges through the Ministries of Education. The training sessions contributed to greater quality of education while free meals gave the children incentives to enrol.

==== Health ====
When first interventions were launched in Sauri, there was only one hospital without a doctor to provide care for the entire population. Between 2005 and 2008, three new clinics and a dispensary were built. Health personnel was hired and trained with the support of the Ministry of Health. In addition to developing better health facilities, one major focus of the MVP was disease control. To stop the spread of Malaria, the MVP distributed free insecticide-treated Olyset nets to all households of Sauri. Long-lasting malaria prevention was to be achieved through training sessions and the durability of those mosquito nets.

==== Infrastructure ====
Improvements in infrastructure were implemented to increase access to markets, water sources, schools and other institutions. Through turbines and pumps, piped water became available to Sauri residents. Further, the MVP subsidized access to an improved electric grid.

== Performance and impacts ==
The outcomes of the SMVP's interventions have been varied since the start of its implementation in 2005. In order to evaluate the performance of the SMVP, baselines were established using either the conditions of the area prior to the project's execution or the conditions of areas in close proximity to Sauri.

=== Agriculture ===
Agricultural productivity limitedly increased after farmers received fertilizers and improved seeds, and training on diversifying their crops. As a result, about 10.1 more bags of crops per hectare were being produced on average by Sauri farmers than those outside the village. However, whether or not this increment in crop yields increased the farmers’ disposable income to reduce poverty levels is not well understood, because more indicators are needed to track how income expenditure changed over the lifespan of the project. Nevertheless, crop diversification on farmland to produce more than just the region's staple maize crop, has helped to spark a transition from subsistence farming to income generation.

=== Education ===
The provision of universal primary education was one of the satisfactory outcomes of the project. Although the Kenyan Government's set of goals to develop the Siaya district cannot be disregarded, the SMVP's strategic location unquestionably attracted greater inputs of investment. This led to improvements in four key areas: free primary education, increased school infrastructure, provision of school meal programs, and improved teacher training. With the enrolment raised to 98% by 2010, all of Sauri's 20,400 primary school children are reportedly receiving daily school meals consisting of locally grown food, as more sustainable food practices are developed within the community. In addition, the ranking of the Kanyuto Sauri Primary School has significantly gone up from being in the top 200 to being in the top 10 in the district. This is largely attributed to the better nutritional status of the student body at the school. However, it has been reported that some children are left out of the lunch meal program if their family fails to provide a designated amount of maize and bean contributions per pupil.

=== Healthcare ===
Previous to the initiation of the SMVP, the population was victim to critical rates of mother-child mortality, undernutrition, anemia, malaria, and intestinal parasites, amongst other health issues. The prevalence rate alone for HIV AIDS was 30% and 43% for malaria in the population before interventions began. In response, the MVP introduced the Sauri Community Dispensary to provide healthcare services that were much nearer to access as compared to the hospital they normally had to travel to. To tackle the spread of malaria, 513 mosquito nets were distributed to households in 2005. Their performance was not as high as expected, due to the fact that only 57% of villagers used the nets following the indications of the healthcare workers that provided the nets. Nonetheless, they were used on a regular basis and those that were still in good condition five years later presented a statistically low 5.26% prevalence of malaria parasites in one of the household members using the nets. As a result of the initiatives carried out to reduce the prevalence of malaria and other health concerns particularly in children, public health improved significantly.

=== Infrastructure ===
With the development of infrastructure and access to public amenities, the expectation for the price of land was that it would increase significantly as compared to the rate of increase of the area just outside of Sauri. However, these prices have been rising at comparable rates, suggesting that the price increase within and outside of Sauri is not necessarily due to the outcomes of the project, making its impact in this regard somewhat ambiguous for development agencies.

Grain banks and storage facilities were set up prior to harvesting seasons in order to reduce the amount of postharvest losses that resulted from the surplus of crop yields. Because productivity increased, farmers had surpluses they could store in these grain banks and improve the food security of the community during lower productive harvesting seasons. These storages were improved in the second year of the project to maintain optimal conditions of the grains over longer periods of time.

=== Community engagement ===
One of the key concerns of the MVP was to engage local people and create “bottom-up”, sustainable processes of development. However, many foreign experts and leadership structures were introduced to Sauri. Although training sessions and interest groups experienced high participation and fostered local community leaders, they did not represent the traditional village administration. Luo power structures in the Sauri sub-location are organized through a chief, village elders and specific age and gender roles that would sometimes interfere with implementations of the MVP.

=== Social networks ===
The notable impacts on the community and change in Sauri's social network structures were some of SMVP's unintended consequences. The development initiatives in Sauri became sources of networking. Many interest groups, cooperatives, and development organizations became involved and formed stronger ties within the community.

Agricultural groups were formed and provided participants with opportunities to create personal networks that initially generated more collaboration and further boosted locals’ expectations for the project. Once they learned to benefit from the formal services, they opted to strengthen them, rather than return to previous, less skilled groups they had before the project. Community members also held "barazas", which became their preferred setting for organizing community meetings, voicing any concerns, or solving disputes between each other. Village elders had a key role in these interactions, as well as in bridging communication between government agencies and MVP participants. Many villagers also had religious affiliations, which became another form of networking that the MVP deeply impacted. Church organizations could unite community members and act as safe locations for them to receive what was perceived as organized and transparent support.

Nevertheless, as the project continued villagers developed a growing concern at the declining trend in collaboration. The lack of trust in the outcomes, failed promises, lack of transparency with MVP resources among the leaders, and inaccessibility by the MVP team were all constraints that began to inhibit collaboration. For example, Jeffrey Sachs began to arrive with police escorts to Sauri, which raised fear amongst the villagers and distanced them from other leaders and project managers.

Given that time is a major variable in the emergence of benefits yielded by the project's interventions, some of the outcomes of the SMVP will take longer to be capitalized into fungible value. MVP investments discontinued in 2015 once the term for intervention expired and the village was expected to be self-sustaining. However, a number of performance indicators suggest that the village was not prepared to continue operations independently.

== Criticisms ==
=== Community engagement ===
One of the largest criticisms of SMVP is that it is a top-down approach to development that lacks consultation and a feedback loop. The “Big Five” development interventions that Sachs identified for Sauri—basic health, education, communication services, safe drinking water, and sanitation—were seen as one-size-fits-all solutions to poverty. SMVP claimed to have incorporated local knowledge through consultation, but that was largely inadequate. In surveys, villagers were assumed to be a homogenous group of similarly poor individuals, and their responses were taken as mutual. This method did not consider that Sauri villagers were not all equally poor or poor in the same way, and therefore had varying interests, wants, and needs. For example, large farmers that produced goods for the world market were more business-oriented, as opposed to small subsistence farmers. Unable to consider these divergences, SMVP's initial goals were not comprehensive enough.

=== Social relations ===
By introducing a model that benefitted wealthy farmers, and systematically disadvantaged poor and subsistence farmers, agricultural interventions exacerbated social inequalities. SMVP introduced a package of hybrid seeds and fertilizers to improve agricultural productivity. These packages were initially handed out free of charge, but were later only available to be purchased. Small subsistence farmers did not have the money to buy these packages, while wealthier farms had more purchasing power and continued to reap the benefits of higher crop yields. Despite an overall welfare gain of this intervention, the gains did not trickle down to the poorest of the poor in Sauri. Instead, by neglecting to consider social relations and long term consequences, it further harmed relations between villagers by exacerbating .

=== Choice of location ===
Sauri may also not have been the best place to receive a Millennium Village designation. The objective of MVP was to reduce poverty in the poorest communities in the world, but Sauri had been receiving funding and assistance throughout the 1990s. Since the early 1990s, the International Center for Research on Agroforestry (ICRAF) and Kenya Agricultural Research Institute (KARI) have been conducting research on soil fertility in Sauri. Further, Africa Now, a UK non-profit group, began funding the building of spring-protection cisterns in Sauri in the late 1990s. If the MVP model were to be truly tested for its potential to eradicate poverty in the most dire communities, some critics, like the journalist Victoria Schlesinger, believe that it would have been more logical to make Millennium Villages out of destinations that have never received external funding or support. While the response has been that Sauri was chosen because of its high levels of poverty and hunger despite having received assistance, critics have accused project managers of choosing Sauri due to its higher potential for success, which would bode well for the MVP model.

=== Evaluation of impacts ===
Weak impact evaluation has also created quite a stir among critics and observers of SMVP alike. Careful project assessment is a necessary mechanism for weeding out project inefficiencies, improving resource allocation, and measuring up project outcomes against its goals. However, MVP data has very strict access, and independent researchers are not allowed to access these files or request interviews with MVP staff members to gain a better understanding of the project. As a result, the public has continually questioned the MVP's data collection methods. In June 2010, a public midterm evaluation of MVP impacts was released for five Millennium Villages, one of which was Sauri. This report compared Sauri's post-intervention circumstances with pre-intervention conditions. It did not take into account what may have occurred in Sauri in the absence of MVP intervention. For example, if Sauri had not been designated a Millennium Village, the government may have implemented similar initiatives, like building schools, improving infrastructure, allocating money to vaccination, or improving teacher training programs. Such changes, if successful, would have also improved standard of living and reduced poverty in Sauri. Because MVP impact evaluation reports did not consider these counterfactuals, MVPs have also been criticized for exaggerating their successes.

=== Conclusions about its status as a Demonstration Project ===
At the time of writing it is 2024, 9 years on from the project completion. It is notable that the project evaluations were carried out in the few years after project completion. They focus, as the earlier part of this article does, on progress in particular fields such as Health and Education.

Whilst this is important and there are plenty of lessons, the big-picture question receives very little attention. The Millennium villages were a demonstration project. They aimed to show that with Sach's approach, villages could become independent of further aid. His thesis was that these villages would move to a situation where they were self-supporting and the improvements made by 2015 could be maintained and built on without further aid.

The 2nd leg of his theory was that, once the success of the projects had been demonstrated other villages could follow the same path and poverty would be eradicated on a sustainable basis, village by village.

The last words of the Sachs/Angelina Jolie Diary video say "1 down, 999,999 to go." So the test of the success of the demonstration is not whether improvements were made in specific areas, but whether other villages followed the same path. 9 years on from the project completion, the situation appears to be that the 999,999 do not exist. Accordingly, the thesis that the methodology could be rolled out to a huge number of villages looks to be incorrect.
