= Sally Kosgei =

Kenyan politician

Dr. Sally Jepng'etich Kosgey

Member of Parliament for Aldai Constituency
- In office 2007–2013
- President: Mwai Kibaki
- Preceded by: New Constituency (after 2007 delimitation)
- Succeeded by: Cornelly Serem

Minister of Higher Education, Science, and Technology
- In office 2008–2010
- President: Mwai Kibaki

Minister of Agriculture
- In office 2010–2013
- President: Mwai Kibaki
- Preceded by: William Ruto
- Succeeded by: Felix Koskei

Personal details
- Born: 1949 (age 76–77) Kenya
- Party: Orange Democratic Movement (ODM)
- Education: University of Dar es Salaam (BA); Stanford University (MA, PhD)
- Occupation: Politician

Dr. Sally Jepng'etich Kosgey (born 1949) is a Kenyan politician. She belongs to ODM and was elected to represent the Aldai Constituency in the National Assembly of Kenya in the 2007 Kenyan parliamentary election.

== Early life and education ==
She was educated at Alliance Girls High School. She obtained a BA degree from the University of Dar es Salaam in 1974. She later received her MA in 1975 and a Ph.D. in 1980, both from Stanford University in the United States.

== Career ==
She worked for various organisations, before being tapped by former President Daniel arap Moi where she worked in various posts culminating in her appointments as ambassador and head of public service/secretary to the cabinet.

=== Political career ===
She also served as minister for higher education in the coalition government which came about in 2008 after the post election violence. However, in April 2010, she swapped jobs with Agriculture Minister William Ruto.

In November 2017 an investigation conducted by the International Consortium of Investigative Journalism cited her name in the list of politicians named in "Paradise Papers" allegations.
