= Odanga =

Odanga is a surname. Notable people with the surname include:

- Donald Odanga (died 2008), Kenyan basketball player
- Joshua Shidambasi Odanga (1924–2016), Kenyan diplomat
