= List of ambassadors of Kenya to France =

Coordinates: 48.865421°N 2.29832°E

Ambassador of Kenya to FranceKenyan embassy in France
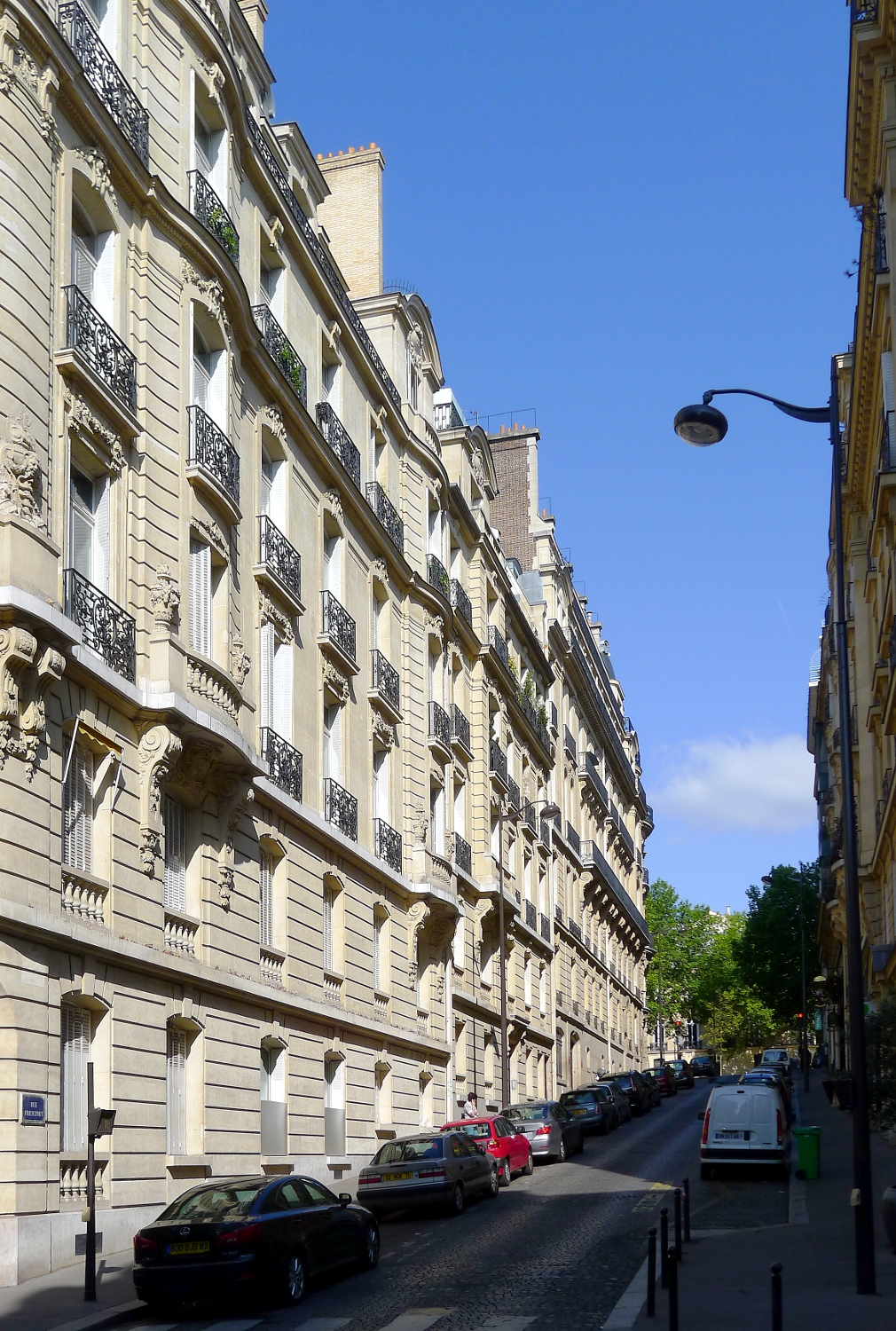
- Incumbent; Lazarus Ombai Amayo since November 29, 2014
- Inaugural holder: Simon Thuo Kairo
- Formation: December 14, 1963

The Kenyan Ambassador in Paris is the official representative of the Government in Nairobi to the Government of France. As of 2020, she is concurrently also accredited in Lisbon, Belgrade and the Holy See.

== List of representatives ==
Diplomatic agreement/designated/Diplomatic accreditation	Ambassador	Observations	President of Kenya	List of presidents of France	Term end
1966	Josephat Karanja		Jomo Kenyatta	Charles de Gaulle	1970
1970	Henry Nzioka Mulli		Jomo Kenyatta	Georges Pompidou	1975
1975	Charles Mutuku Muema	Chargé d'affaires ( 18 October 2001 at Kenyatta National Hospital): 1991 Chargé d'affaires in Harare.	Jomo Kenyatta	Valéry Giscard d’Estaing	1976
1976	Nicholas Muratha Mugo		Jomo Kenyatta	Valéry Giscard d’Estaing	1977
1977	John Muriu Kiboi	Chargé d'affaires	Jomo Kenyatta	Valéry Giscard d’Estaing	1978
1978	Moses Shiverenje Simani	Chargé d'affaires, (*1930 Kiamosi): High Commissioner in India and Ottawa	Daniel Arap Moi	Valéry Giscard d’Estaing	1979
1979	Bethuel Abdu Kiplagat	(* November 28, 1936), Kapsabet, Nandi District, Kenya; Educated Maseno Secondary School BSc, Kenyan sociologist, diplomat.; married, three; 1962-1963: Kenya Institute of Administration.; 1963-1964: Oxford University Public Administration Course.; 1965: Carnegie Course in Diplomacy K.I.A.	Daniel Arap Moi	Valéry Giscard d’Estaing	1982
1982	John Kamau Kimani		Daniel Arap Moi	François Mitterrand	1984
1984	Ben Edward Mwangi		Daniel Arap Moi	François Mitterrand	1985
1985	Julius Kasyoka Mbaluli	Chargé d'affaires	Daniel Arap Moi	François Mitterrand	1987
1987	Simon Arap Bullut		Daniel Arap Moi	François Mitterrand	1992
1996	Steven Arphaxard Kasumi Andrew Loyatum		Daniel Arap Moi	Jacques Chirac	2000
2000	Boaz Kidiga Mbaya		Daniel Arap Moi	Jacques Chirac	2003
2004	Raychelle Omamo	Chargé d'affaires	Mwai Kibaki	Jacques Chirac	2008
2008	Edwin Maloba	Chargé d'affaires	Mwai Kibaki	Nicolas Sarkozy	2009
July 2, 2009	Elkanah Odembo		Mwai Kibaki	Nicolas Sarkozy	2010
2010	Edwin Maloba	Chargé d'affaires	Mwai Kibaki	Nicolas Sarkozy	2011
2011	Dickson Njoli		Mwai Kibaki	Nicolas Sarkozy	2012
December 3, 2010	Salama Abdilahi Ahmed		Mwai Kibaki	Nicolas Sarkozy	
2012	Anthony Safari Gona	Chargé d'affaires	Mwai Kibaki	François Hollande	
2018	H.E Professor Judi Wakhungu EGH	Chargé d'affaires	Uhuru Kenyatta	Emmanuel Macron	at least 2022
