= Henry Nzioka Mulli =

Diplomat from Kenya

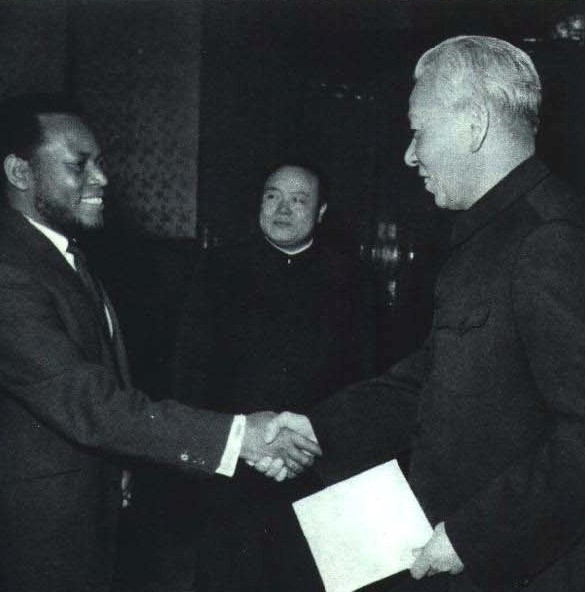

Kenyan Ambassador to China
- In office December 29, 1964 – 1965
- Preceded by: Simon Thuo Kairo
- Succeeded by: Theophilus Arap Koske

Kenyan Ambassador to Egypt
- In office 1966–1967
- Preceded by: Theophilus Arap Koske
- Succeeded by: 1996-2003: Mohamed Maalim Mohamud

Kenyan Ambassador to Somalia
- In office 1968–1969
- Succeeded by: 1974-1976: Joshua Shidambasi Odanga

Kenyan Ambassador to France
- In office 1970–1973
- Preceded by: Juxon Levi Madoka Shako; Josephat Karanja
- Succeeded by: C. M. Muema

Personal details
- Born: 1927 Machakos
- Died: July 6, 2015 (aged 88) Kenya
- Spouse(s): Doris Mulli, Anna Mulli and common law wife Benadatte Mulli.
- Children: Faith Uku (NJ), Late Col. Victor Mulli, Monica Gomes (NJ), Dr. James Mulli (Luxembourg), the late Peter Harrison Mulli (Kenya), Benjamin Mulli(Kenya), Stepchild Consolata Mulli(NJ) Stepchild Boniface Mulli (Kenya), Mary Mulli (Kenya) and Moses Mulli (Kenya) Stepchild Jacinta Mwende Mulli and Stepchild Carol Veronica Mulli (MD).
- Relatives: He was brother to the late Josiah Wambua Muli, Late Hon. Justice Matthew Guy Mulli, Late Zakayo Muli, Alice Mitaa, Rhoda Maingi, Ndinda Paul and Late Joel Mweu Muli
- Education: 1946-1947 G.A.S. Machakos, Alliance High School, Makerere University College.; 1948 B.Sc. Fort Hare University South Africa.; 1960: Oxford University.

Henry Nzioka Mulli (1927 – July 5, 2015) was a Kenyan diplomat.

== Career ==
- From 1951 to 1953 he was Assistant Government Chemist in Tanganyika.
- From 1953 to 1957 he was detained by the regime of the Kenya Colony.
- In 1960 he became Master of Science at the Machakos High School.
- In 1961 he was elected Member for Machakos to the Legislative Council.
- In 1962 he was with Justus Kandet ole Tipis (1924-1995) Parliamentary Secretary in the Ministry of Kenya Defence.
- In the elections in May 1963 he ran directly against Paul Ngei and lost.
- From 1964 to 1965 he was ambassador in Beijing in the People's Republic of China.
- From 1965 to 1966 he was ambassador in Cairo.
- From 1968 to 1969 he was ambassador in Mogadishu (Somalia)
- From 1970 to 1973 he was ambassador in Bonn (Germany)
- In 1974 - 1976 he was ambassador in Paris (France)].
- In 1992 - 1993 he was Chairman of the Cooperative Bank of Kenya.
