= Bruce Mackenzie (disambiguation) =

Bruce Mackenzie was the Kenyan Minister of Agriculture, assassinated by Idi Amin in 1978.

Bruce Mackenzie may also refer to:

- Bruce MacKenzie (Canadian politician) in 1959 Manitoba general election
- Bruce Mackenzie, space activist, see Mars to Stay
- Bruce Mackenzie, Australian landscape architect

== See also ==
- Mackenzie (surname)
