= Aldai Constituency =

Kenyan electoral constituency

Aldai Constituency is an electoral constituency in Kenya. It is one of six constituencies of Nandi County. The constituency was established for the 1966 elections. The constituency has six wards, all electing Members of County Assembly for Nandi County. Aldai is one of the constituencies being led by Hon Cornelly serem 2013-17 Jubilee elect.

== Members of Parliament ==
Elections	MP	Party	Notes
1966-1969	John K. Cheruiyot	KANU	
1969-1974	Simeon Kiptum arap Choge	KANU	One-party system
1974-1979	Simeon Kiptum arap Choge	KANU	One-party system
1979-1983	Samuel Kibiebei arap Ngeny	KANU	One-party system
1983-1988	Samuel Kibiebei arap Ngeny	KANU	One-party system
1988-1992	John Kiplagat Cheruiyot	KANU	One-party system
1992-1997	J. Paul Titi	KANU	
1997-2002	Simeon Kiptum Choge	KANU	
2002-2007	Jimmy Choge	KANU	
2007-2012	Dr Sally Jepng'etich Kosgei	ODM	
2013-2017	Cornelly Serem	URP	
2017-2022	Cornelly Serem	JP	
2022	Marianne Jebet Kitany	UDA	

== Election results ==
=== 2017 General Election ===
General election 2017: Aldai
Party	Candidate	Votes	%
Jubilee	Cornelly Serem	28,907	56.4
Independent	Kipcho Sammy Choge	18,568	36.2
Amani	Sammy Sawe Kipkemboi	1,385	2.7
Progressive Party Of Kenya	Naftali Agusioma	1,262	2.5
KANU	Evanson Kimaiyo Maiyo	780	1.5
Chama Cha Mashinani	Gilbert Kipchumba Melly	341	0.7
Majority		10,339	20.2

== Wards ==
Ward	Population	Area (km²)
Kabwareng	22,807	47
Kaptumo	24,464	98
Kemeloi / Maraba	35,085	115
Koyo / Ndurio	19,905	69
Kobujoi	26,559	81
Terik	22,807	48
Total	149,256	458
