= Felix Koskei =

Kenyan politician

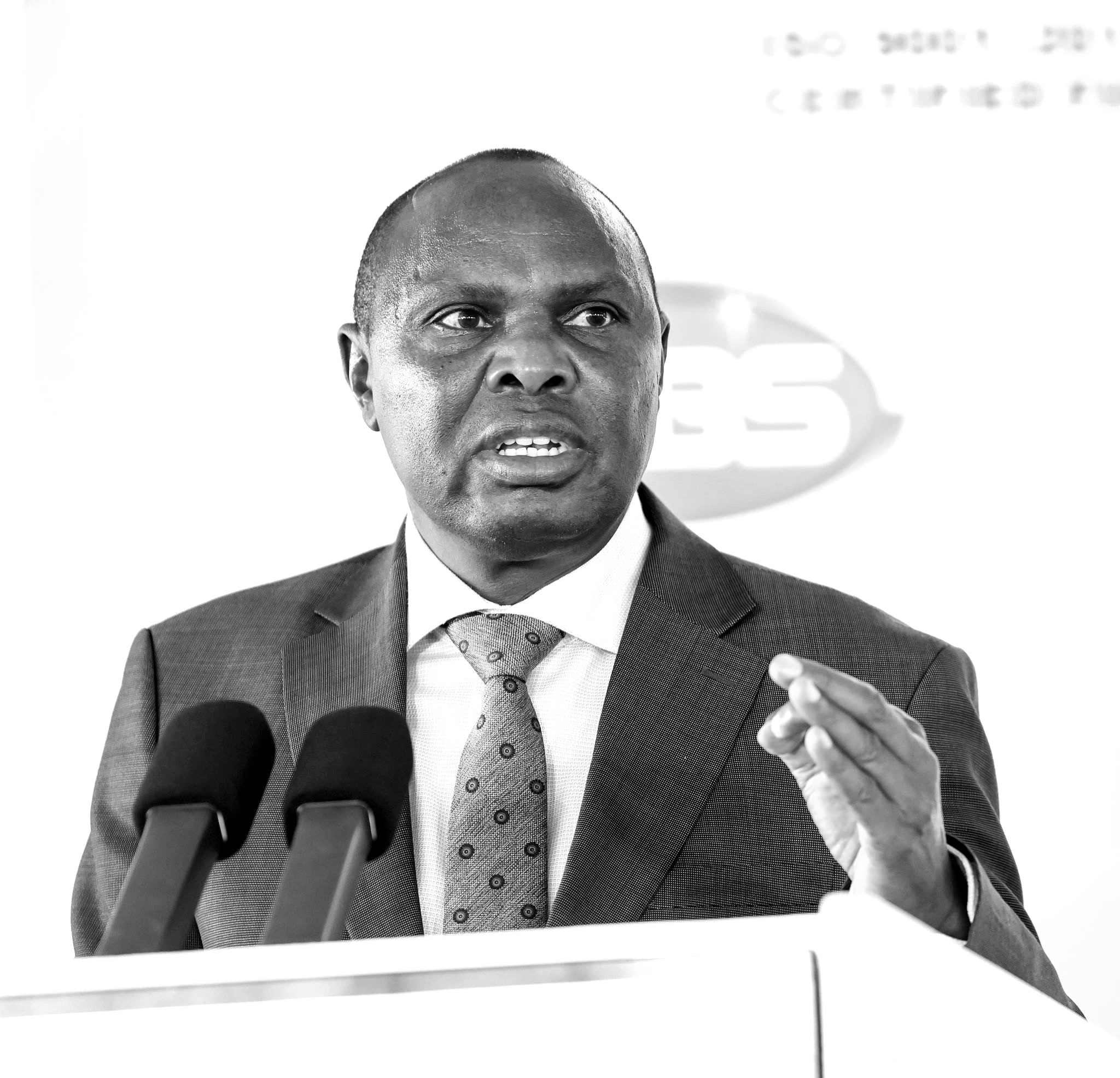
- Koskei in 2024

Head of Public Service
- Incumbent
- Assumed office 11 September 2022
- President: Dr William Ruto
- Preceded by: Joseph Kinyua

Cabinet Secretary for Agriculture, Livestock and Fisheries (suspended)
- In office 15 May 2013 – 2015
- President: Uhuru Kenyatta
- Preceded by: Hon Dr Sally Kosgei
- Succeeded by: Willy Bett

Personal details
- Born: 6 June 1964 (age 62) Nandi
- Spouse: Margaret Koskei
- Children: 4
- Education: University of Nairobi (BSc), (MBA)

Felix Kiptarus Koskei (born 1964) is a Kenyan who is currently the Head of Public Service in President Ruto government.

== Government career ==
In 2015 while serving as Agriculture minister, Koskei came under corruption allegations over personal land use and stepped down from government. He later returned to his post.

In 2022, Koskei became the Head of Public Service under the Ruto Administration. In his role, Koskei oversees government restructuring and public projects. In 2023, Koskei made headlines after suspending 67 police officers and six chief officers of government agencies after alleging corruption. In 2024, it was reported in local media that Koskei was behind efforts to acquire spyware, which he denied. In May 2025, Koskei announced the discontinuation of government recruiting and the merging or elimination of 42 state corporations.

Koskei has come under scrutiny after control of the Kenyan public seal was moved to his office. In 2023, Executive Order No. 2 of 2023, transferred the seal from the Attorney General's office to the Head of Public Service. In 2025, a coalition of human rights groups sued Koskei and Kenyan Attorney General Chacha Mwita arguing the seal was illegally moved. In June 2025, the Nairobi High Court suspended the order.
