= Galana Kulalu Project =

Galana Kulalu Irrigation Development
- Location: Kilifi County and Tana River County, Kenya
- Owner: Government of Kenya (Public-Private Partnership)
- Country: Kenya
- Ministry: Ministry of Water, Sanitation and Irrigation
- Launched: 2014
- Status: Active

The Galana Kulalu Project (formally the Galana Kulalu Food Security Project) is a US$52,670,000 agricultural and irrigation initiative by the government of Kenya in partnership with the private sector aimed at providing Food Security. The project forms part of Kenya's broader efforts to expand irrigated agriculture and improve domestic food production in the country's arid and semi-arid lands. The National Irrigation Authority is the primary implementing agency. On completion, the scheme was designed to be the biggest in East and Southern Africa.

The project has been described as one of the most ambitious agricultural schemes ever undertaken in Kenya. Supporters argue that it could significantly improve national food security and reduce dependence on imported maize, while critics have questioned its long-term economic viability, environmental sustainability and implementation strategy. The project faced some challenges in implementation that delayed its initial timelines, stalling in 2019 after the government terminated the contractor. It was later restructured and revived in 2023 under a public-private partnership model.

== Background ==
Maize is a staple food in Kenya. However, the country suffers from a perennial maize shortage and recurring food insecurity, largely due to its heavy reliance on rain-fed agriculture. According to the government of Kenya, arid and semi-arid land regions constitute approximately 80 percent of the country's landmass and are highly vulnerable to drought and food insecurity. Recurrent droughts in 2009, 2011, 2017 and 2022 intensified calls for large-scale irrigation projects to stabilise food production and build resilience against climate change.

The Galana Kulalu project is expected to end the perennial maize shortage in the country by cultivating 200,000 acres of the Galana-Kulalu complex to meet 41 pe cent of the country's annual maize consumption of 48 million bags. In order to cushion farmers against an oversupply of maize that could hurt their earnings, maize at Galana will be grown for only one season per year.

== Location and geography ==
The Galana Kulalu complex sits on a 1.75-million-acre tract of land straddling the border of Kilifi County and Tana River County. The project area lies within Kenya's coastal lowlands and is traversed by the Galana River, one of the country's major perennial rivers flowing into the Indian Ocean. The surrounding ecosystem forms part of the greater Tsavo conservation landscape, directly bordering the Tsavo East National Park, which is home to elephants, antelope species and migratory wildlife corridors.

== History ==
=== Proposal and pilot phase (2013–2018) ===
The project was officially launched in 2013 with an initial budget of Sh9 billion, backed by a loan from Israel's Bank Leumi. The government contracted an Israeli firm, Green Arava, to develop a 10,000-acre model farm. The pilot phase attracted national attention because it was expected to serve as a model for transforming Kenya's drylands into highly productive commercial farmland using modern centre pivot irrigation.

=== Stalling and suspension (2019–2022) ===
Despite high expectations, the model farm significantly underperformed. By 2019, the project had stalled entirely. Following contractual disputes over payment terms with the Ministry of Water and Irrigation, Green Arava exited the project. Parliamentary committees and audit reports later questioned the procurement process, project feasibility assessments and the cost-effectiveness of the pilot programme.

=== Restructuring and revival (2023–Present) ===
In January 2023, the government directed the revival of the scheme under a public-private partnership (PPP) arrangement. The government leased sections of the irrigable land to private firms, including Selu Africa Limited. By late 2025, the revived project yielded its first major harvests, marking a new phase in the country's efforts to rebuild domestic food production under private operational management.

== Objectives ==
The primary goals of the Galana Kulalu project include:

- Food security: To drastically reduce reliance on foreign food supplies and eliminate national food deficits.
- Maize import reduction: Cultivating enough acreage to meet over 40% of the country's annual maize consumption.
- Economic transformation: Generating agricultural employment, stabilising the Kenyan shilling by reducing foreign exchange expenditure on imports and supporting agro-processing industries.

== Implementation and infrastructure ==
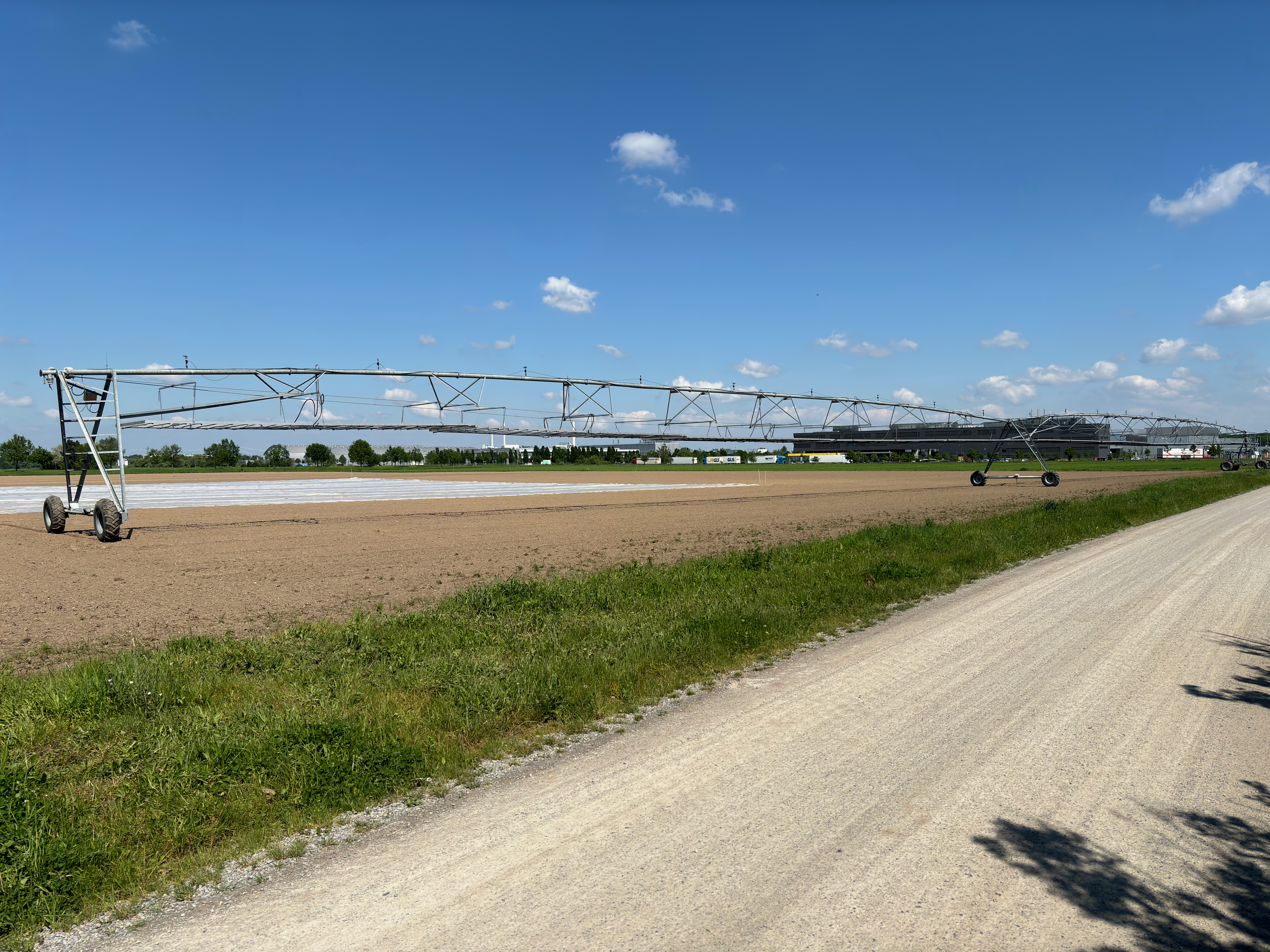
Center-pivot irrigation system

The project relies on advanced centre pivot irrigation technology and a gravity-fed water system designed to draw from the Galana River. Recent expansions have introduced a 20,000-cubic-metre intake well, a 550,000-cubic-metre reservoir, and a 2-kilometer main canal to stabilise year-round water supply.

To support these systems, the government initiated the Ksh 2.98 billion Galana Kulalu Electrification project (GKFSCEP) in collaboration with the Rural Electrification and Renewable Energy Corporation. The electrification programme was intended to lower operational costs associated with diesel-powered irrigation while improving the long-term sustainability of the scheme.

== Governance and stakeholders ==
The governance structure of Galana Kulalu has evolved from a purely state-run operation to a collaborative model. The key stakeholders include:

- Public sector: The National Irrigation Authority (NIA), the Ministry of Water, Sanitation and Irrigation and the Ministry of Agriculture.
- Private sector: Firms such as Selu Limited bear the operational responsibility and performance risks.
- Local government: The county governments of Kilifi and Tana River, representing community interests and local land use.

== Crops and agricultural production ==
The initial 1,500 acres under private management yielded between 28 and 30 bags of seed maize per acre, which project officials described as a strong result for semi-arid conditions of the Galana basin. The project has increasingly shifted toward crop diversification in order to reduce dependence on maize monoculture and improve commercial viability. Beyond maize, sections of the project are being prepared for horticulture, cassava and green gram production.

== Water resource management ==
Water management is central to the project's viability. Hydrological studies of the Sabaki-Galana catchment indicate that while the available surface water can sufficiently meet the irrigation demands for 8,000 hectares, massive expansion requires artificial storage. Consequently, the government has proposed the construction of the Galana Dam, whose hydrological models suggest could safely sustain up to 81,000 hectares of irrigation while mitigating drought effects.

== Environmental concerns ==
Environmental experts and conservationists have raised concerns over the long-term sustainability of large-scale irrigation along the Galana River, particularly during prolonged drought periods. Some ecological studies have suggested that large-scale irrigation in fragile ecosystems can strain groundwater, alter soil chemistry and increase salinity if not properly managed.

Concerns have also been expressed regarding potential human–wildlife conflict due to the project's proximity to Tsavo East National Park. Local stakeholders have noted that the expansion of agricultural land and fencing may reduce the natural range and water access for migratory wildlife in the Galana Ranch corridor.

== Economic impact ==
Supporters of the PPP model argue that private-sector participation reduces the fiscal burden on taxpayers and improves operational efficiency. The project is projected to create over 2,000 direct jobs for residents of Kilifi and Tana River counties as acreage expands. However, critics maintain that the project's profitability remains uncertain given the high initial infrastructure, electrification and irrigation costs.

== Controversy ==
The Galana Kulalu project has been marred with controversy bordering on misappropriation of funds.

Official reports from the Auditor-General highlighted significant discrepancies during the project's initial phase, noting that billions of shillings were spent while a vast majority of the leased land remained idle. Further controversies surrounded the lack of proper valuation of assets, unsupported debtor accounts and procurement irregularities. Some agricultural experts argued that the initial emphasis on maize production ignored ecological realities in the ASAL region and underestimated the true costs of irrigation farming in remote, underdeveloped areas.

== Current status ==
As of late 2025 and early 2026, the government and its private partners are actively fast-tracking critical infrastructure. Selu Limited harvested an initial 330 acres in October 2025 and aims to expand cultivation to 3,200 acres by the end of 2025 and 5,400 acres by mid-2026. Government officials have stated that the long-term objective is to gradually scale the irrigated acreage while integrating agro-processing, storage facilities and export-oriented agriculture to establish a comprehensive food hub.

== See also ==
- Agriculture in Kenya
- Water supply and sanitation in Kenya
- Climate change in Kenya
- Galana River
- Centre pivot irrigation
