= List of ambassadors of Kenya to China =

Coordinates: 39.944121°N 116.452160°E

Ambassador of Kenya to China
- Incumbent; Amb. Mary Muthoni Gichohi since June 2022
- Inaugural holder: Simon Thuo Kairo
- Formation: December 14, 1963

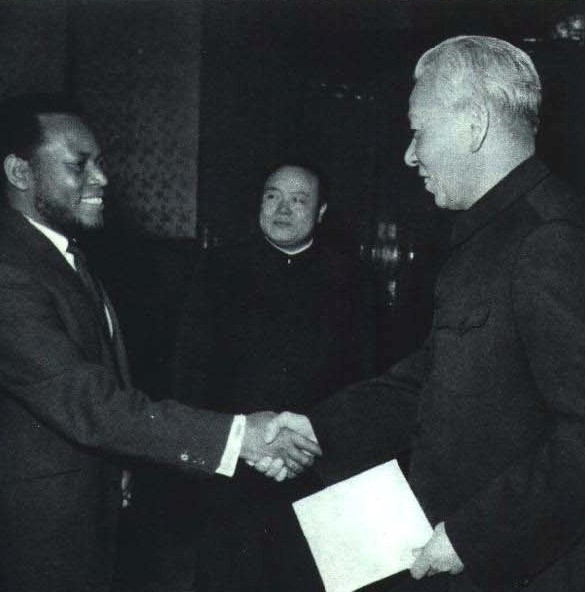
Henry Nzioka Mulli, Kenya's first ambassador to China, with Liu Shaoqi.

The Kenyan Ambassador in Beijing is the official representative of the Government in Nairobi to the Government of the People's Republic of China.

== List of representatives ==
diplomatic agreement/designated/Diplomatic accreditation	ambassador	Observations	List of heads of state of Kenya	Premier of the People's Republic of China	Term end
December 14, 1963	Simon Thuo Kairo	In 1963 he joined the Diplomatic Service.; 1964-1965 Second Secretary and Charge d'Affaires in Beijing, to open Kenya's embassy there	Jomo Kenyatta	Zhou Enlai	
1964	Henry Nzioka Mulli		Jomo Kenyatta	Zhou Enlai	1965
1965	Theophilus Arap Koske		Jomo Kenyatta	Zhou Enlai	July 1967
1965		China had recalled its ambassador, who had not returned to his post by the time of Li Chieh's expulsion. In retaliation Red Guards (China) demonstrators smashed Kenyan embassy windows in Beijing which was closed afterwards.	Jomo Kenyatta	Zhou Enlai	1979
1965	Stephen Mativo Maitha	China expelled the Kenya charge d'affaires in Beijing in July 1967, leaving the Kenya embassy there without any top-level representation.	Jomo Kenyatta	Zhou Enlai	July 1967
1977	Simon Mulei Muthoka	(*1937)	Jomo Kenyatta	Hua Guofeng	1980
April 14, 1979	Joshua Shidambasi Odanga		Daniel Arap Moi	Hua Guofeng	December 14, 1983
1988	Jelani Habib	Habib Jilani was ambassador to China until 1994 and was then appointed ambassador to Tanzania.: graduated in 1970 with a BSc degree in agricultural economics from the University of Rutgers in New Jersey. Born in 1942 in Lamu County, Kenya, Jelani has over 38 years of professional experience in the public and private sectors. He worked in the private sector in 1971-1972 before joining public service in mid-1972 and has served at various positions in the ministries of trade and foreign affairs. From 1973 to 1982, he served in different capacities in Kenya’s foreign missions: London, Cairo, Paris and Washington, D.C., with duties including improving trade, tourism and investment between Kenya and these capitals.	Daniel Arap Moi	Li Peng	1994
1995	James Simani		Daniel Arap Moi	Li Peng	
1999	Matthew Kathurima M'Ithiri	(Meru, Kenya)	Daniel Arap Moi	Zhu Rongji	
June 25, 2004	Ruth-Grace Sereti Solitei		Mwai Kibaki	Wen Jiabao	July 31, 2007
2006		The Kenyan Ministry of foreign affairs acquired a chancery and an ambassador's residence in China for 515 million Kenyan shilling, saving the government an annual rent of 12.6 million Kenyan shilling.	Mwai Kibaki	Wen Jiabao	
2008	Julius Lekakeny Sunkuli		Mwai Kibaki	Wen Jiabao	September 3, 2012
October 11, 2013	Michael Denis Mukiri Kinyanjui	From July 11, 1996 to October 3, 2003 he was ambassador in Vienna.; On October 3, 2003 he was ambassador in Sweden.	Uhuru Kenyatta	Li Keqiang	

- Chinese Ambassador to Kenya
