= Poultry farming in Kenya =

Part of the Kenya's agricultural economy

Location of Kenya

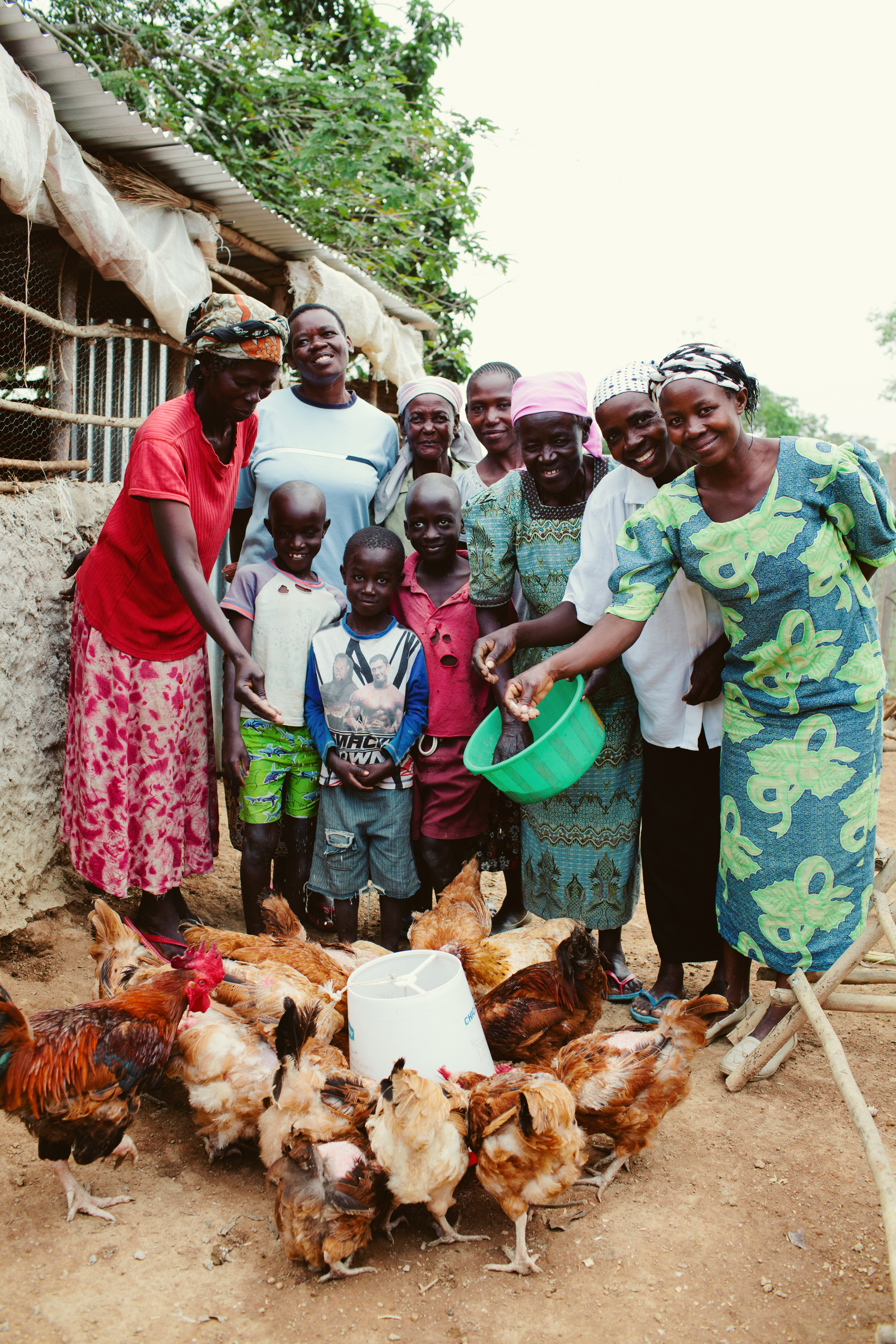
Small-scale poultry production in Kenya

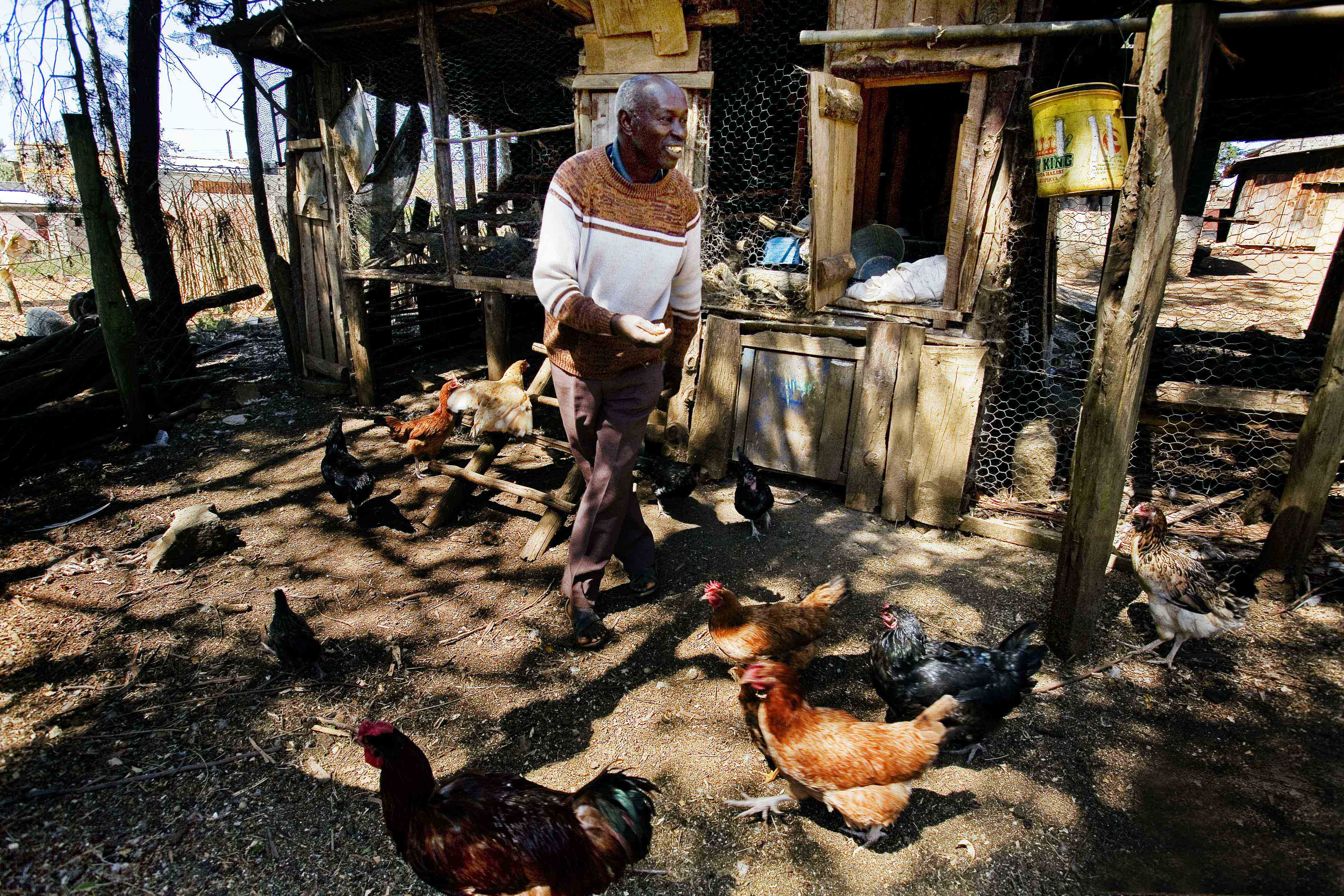
Small-scale poultry production at a farm near Gilgil, Kenya

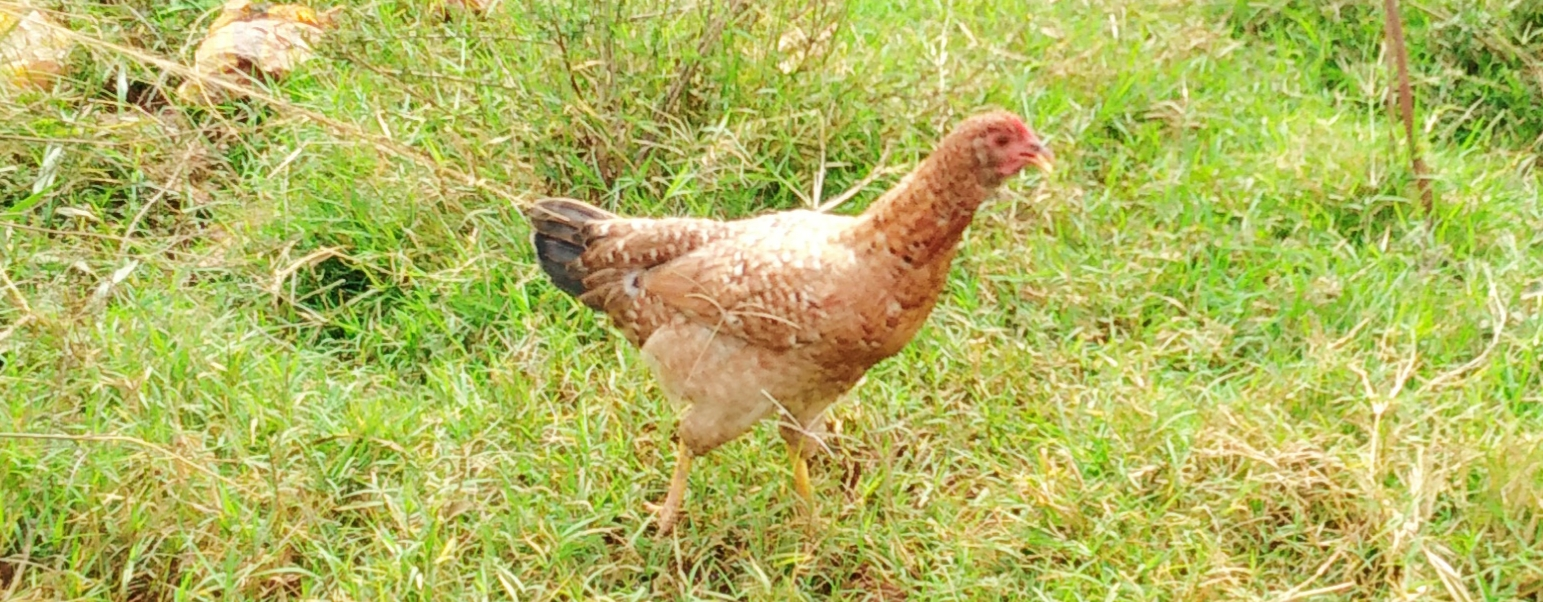
chicken breed known in Kenya for its high egg production

Poultry farming in Kenya is a widespread occupation. It is mostly practiced on a small-scale, and predominantly for domestic consumption.

Poultry farming is the raising of domesticated birds such as chickens, turkeys, ducks, and geese, producing meat and eggs. In the event of frequent food shortages and fluctuating prices, some farmers have embraced commercial methods.

== Categories ==
These farmers are classified in several categories:

- 1 – 1000 birds: small scale farmers
- 1001 – 10,000 birds: medium scale farmers
- 10,000+ birds: large scale farmers

The most prevalent animal in Kenya is chicken. Small numbers rear other types of birds. Some farmers specialise on rearing chickens for meat only (broilers), while others focus on egg production (layers); and yet others specialise in rearing the Kienyeji type (indigenous chickens where both cocks and hens live together).

== Commercial breeds ==
There are four Commercial chicken breeds in Kenya:

- Broilers
- Layers
- Improved Indigenous breeds such KARI Improved Kienyeji chicken, Kenbro, Sasso Kuroilers
- Pure Indigenous chicken / Village chicken

== Operations ==
=== KARI Improved Kienyeji Chicken ===
KARI Improved kienyeji chicken is a dual purpose chicken that is reared for both meat and eggs. In Kenya, KARI Improved kienyeji chicken is reared by individual smallholder farmers and is preferred due to its HIGH DISEASE RESISTANCE, low feed consumption and high egg production. The bird also matures early at only four and a half months of age. The main company that deals with this breed is HOMERANGE POULTRY KENYA. This company supplies day old chicks, poultry feed specifically formulated for this breed of chicken, and also meat locally.

Broilers are reared for meat. In Kenya, broilers are raised both by corporations and individuals. Large scale companies include Isinya Poultry, Kenchic and Brade Gate Poultry Industries. These companies supply meat locally as well as to other countries.

=== Layers ===
Large scale layer growers are Muguku Farms, s24 eggs and chicks nyeri Karatina Softkenya Farm Limited and Sigma Supplies.

=== Kenbro ===
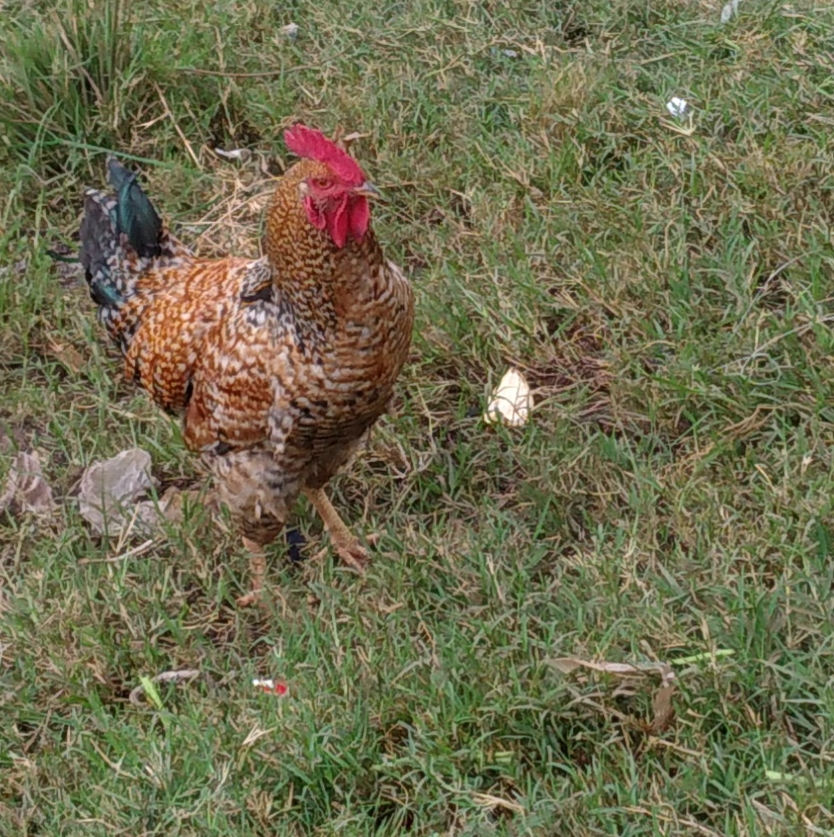
Kienyeji Chicken

Kenbro belongs to Kenchick. Kenbro chickens can be reared both for eggs and meat. These chickens are fed for six months before they start laying. Their egg production is lower than that of layers. Those reared for meat take longer to mature than broilers.

== See also ==
https://kienyeji.org

- Agriculture in Kenya
