= Simon Thuo Kairo =

Kenyan diplomat and politician

Kenyan Ambassador to China
- In office 1964–1965
- Succeeded by: Henry Nzioka Mulli

Member of Parliament (Nakuru Town East Constituency)
- In office 1974–1978
- President: Daniel Arap Moi

Personal details
- Born: 1930 Kikuyu
- Died: 30 August 2007 (aged 76–77) Kileleshwa
- Spouse(s): Nellie Wanjiro Kairo and Susan Wahu Kairo
- Children: Nancy, Judy, Tommy, Betty, Chris, Wambui and Wanjiru Kairo
- Education: Budo College, Uganda; Huron College; Northeast State Teachers College
- Occupation: Diplomat and politician

Simon Thuo Kairo (1930 – 30 August 2007) was a Kenyan diplomat and politician. He was one of the beneficiaries of the Kennedy Airlifts to America in 1959. He was the first Kenyan ambassador to China and was elected to be the member of parliament of Nakuru East in 1974.

== Education ==
Kairo graduated in 1963 from Huron College with a Bachelor of Arts in political science. He also studied at Northeast State Teachers College, Missouri from 1959 to 1960 and Long Island University in New York from 1960 to 1961.

== Career ==
- He was Assistant Clerk in the Kenyan Parliament.
- In 1963 he joined the Diplomatic Service.
- From 1964 to 1965 he was Second Secretary and Charge d'Affaires in Beijing to open Kenya's embassy there.
- In 1965 he became Private Secretary to Jomo Kenyatta.
- In 1968 he founded the first Kenyan owned Tours and Safaris operation, Malaika Safaris.
- On 1 November 1974 he was elected in the Constituency of Nakuru East as Member of the Kenyan National Assembly and was appointed Assistant Minister for Labour.
