= Bruce McKenzie =

Kenyan politician

Bruce Roy McKenzie
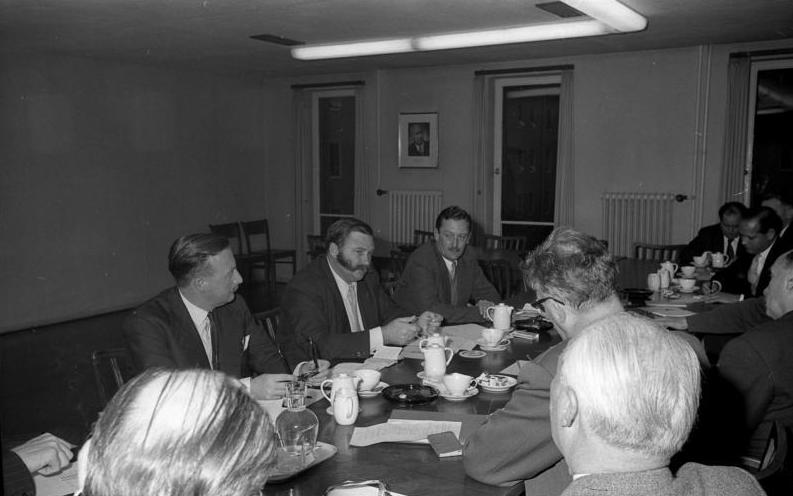
- Bruce McKenzie second from left.

Kenyan Minister of Agriculture
- In office 1959–1960 and 1963–1970

Minister for Land Settlement
- In office 1962–1963

Member of the House of Representatives
- In office 1963

Personal details
- Born: 1 January 1919 Richmond, Natal Province, Union of South Africa
- Died: 24 May 1978 (aged 59) above Ngong Hills, Kenya
- Cause of death: Time bomb
- Education: Hilton College, Natal, South Africa

Bruce Roy McKenzie DSO DFC EGH (1 January 1919 – 24 May 1978) was a South African-born Kenyan politician. He was the Minister of Agriculture in Kenya during the presidency of Jomo Kenyatta, to whom he was an adviser. He is alleged to have been an agent for British, South African or Israeli intelligence.

== Early life ==
McKenzie was born in 1919 in Richmond in the Union of South Africa's Natal Province. He joined the South African Air Force in 1939, and was seconded during World War II to Britain's Royal Air Force and the Royal Australian Air Force with which he saw action in North Africa, commanding 458 Squadron RAAF and subsequently 17 Squadron SAAF, in the Mediterranean and European theatres. Following his air force service, he emigrated to Kenya in 1946 and became a prominent farmer in Nakuru.

== Political career ==
In Colonial Kenya he was a member of the legislative Council, known as Legco from 1957-63 and held the post of Minister for Agriculture in 1959–1960 and Minister for Land Settlement 1962–1963.

Post Independence in 1963 he was an appointed member of the House of Representatives (KANU) in 1963 and appointed Minister for Agriculture and Animal Husbandry. He was instrumental in implementing the policy of buying land back from settlers, funded by the British Government, and transferring ownership to Kenyans.

== Post-political career activities ==
It is alleged that in January 1976, McKenzie was involved in the kidnapping of two German and three Arab suspected terrorists wanted by Israel for an attempted missile attack on an El Al airliner taking off from the airport of Nairobi. The five were secretly transported to Israel and later sentenced to long prison terms.

In late June 1976, during Operation Entebbe, McKenzie persuaded Kenyan President Kenyatta to permit Mossad to collect intelligence prior to the operation, and to allow the Israeli Air Force access to the Nairobi airport. Before the operation, McKenzie assisted a Mossad agent who flew a small plane to Entebbe to take aerial photographs of the airport installations and parked fighter jets which were destroyed by the Israeli troops in the raid.

On 24 May 1978, McKenzie was killed when a bomb attached to his aircraft exploded, as he departed a meeting with Amin. Some sources allege that Ugandan President Idi Amin ordered Ugandan agents to assassinate MacKenzie in retaliation for his involvement with the Entebbe rescue. Some report that the bomb was concealed inside either a mounted antelope head, or a carved wooden statue in the form of a lion's head, which McKenzie had been presented as a gift from Idi Amin just prior to the flight. Other sources have suggested various other possible causes for the bombing, including that another person, also aboard the plane, may have been the target.

Later, Israel's Chief Director of Mossad, Meir Amit, had a forest planted in Israel in McKenzie's name.
