= Harry Mutuma Kathurima =

Mutuma Kathurima
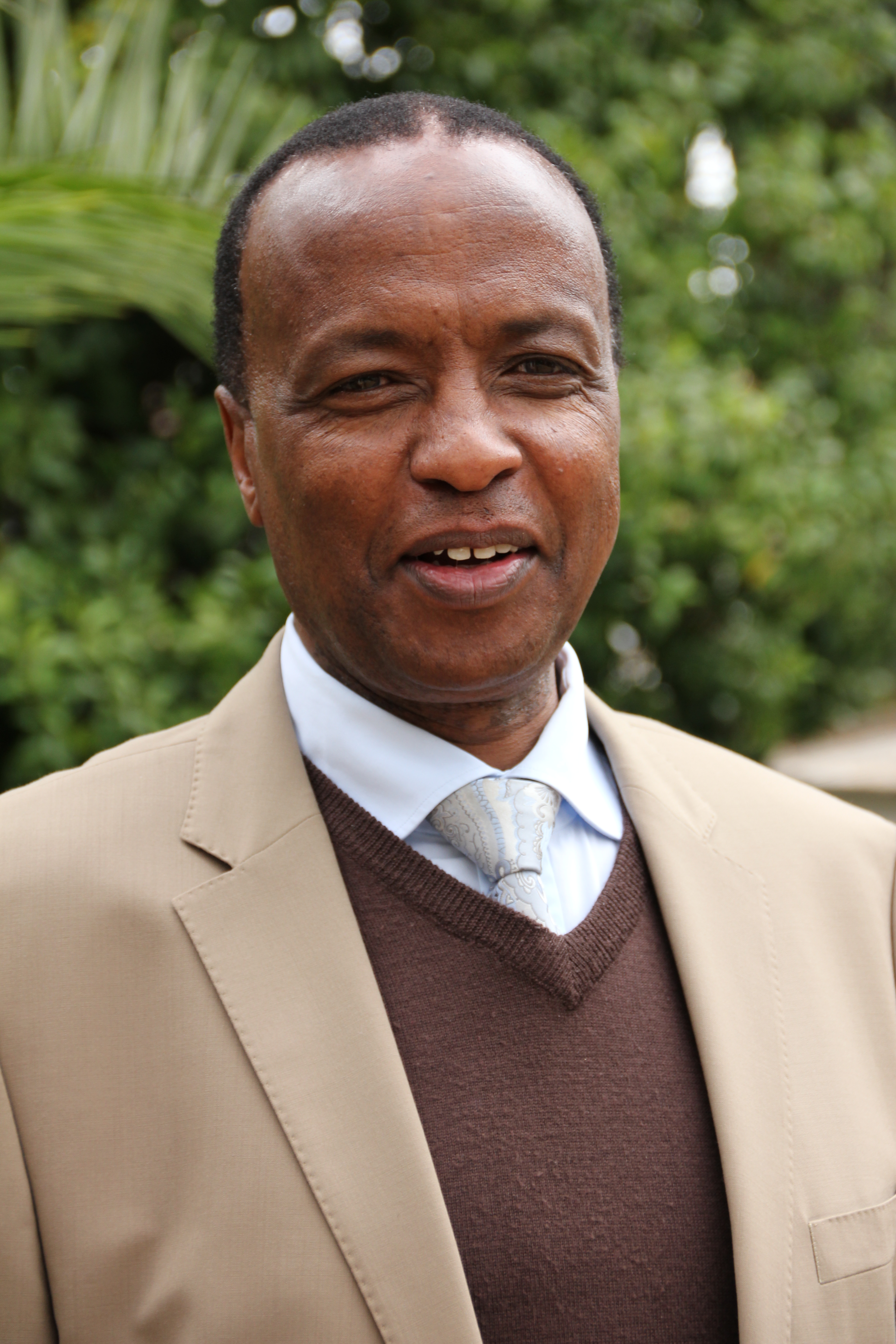

Personal details
- Born: Harry Mutuma Kathurima; 20 August 1952 (age 74)
- Occupation: Diplomat

Harry Mutuma Kathurima (born 20 August 1952 in Meru) is a Kenyan diplomat. Kathurima was from August 2005 to September 2010 Kenyan ambassador to Germany.

== Background ==
Kathurima studied humanities at the University of Nairobi and graduated in 1976. In 1982 he completed a degree in Public Administration from the University of Birmingham. In the late 1970s he worked as a district officer in Malindi District, after which he worked until 1982 in the office of the provincial council in Mombasa. In 1985, he joined the Office of the President where he worked as Assistant Secretary. Then followed a post as secretary of state from 1991 to 1997 as chief of protocol. He subsequently held positions in urban ministry and the Ministry of Co-development. In 2004 he was appointed to the Foreign Service and served as High Commissioner in New Delhi. During his two-year stay in India Kathurima was also accredited to Bangladesh, Singapore and Sri Lanka. From August 2005 to September 2010 he served as ambassador to Germany.

== Kalonzo campaign ==
Mutuma Kathurima was named the head of Kalonzo Musyoka's presidential campaign advisory group in January 2012 which included the current government spokesman, Muthui Kariuki and 16 other members.

== Personal life ==
Kathurima is married and has two children.
