= Cornelly Serem =

Kenyan politician

Cornelly Serem is a Kenyan politician who is a former member of the National Assembly for Aldai Constituency. He was a member of the Jubilee Party.

== Election results ==
General election 2017: Aldai
Party	Candidate	Votes	%
Jubilee	Cornelly Serem	28,907	56.4
Independent	Kipcho Sammy Choge	18,568	36.2
Amani	Sammy Sawe Kipkemboi	1,385	2.7
Progressive Party Of Kenya	Naftali Agusioma	1,262	2.5
KANU	Evanson Kimaiyo Maiyo	780	1.5
Chama Cha Mashinani	Gilbert Kipchumba Melly	341	0.7
Majority		10,339	20.2
