= Agriculture in Kenya =

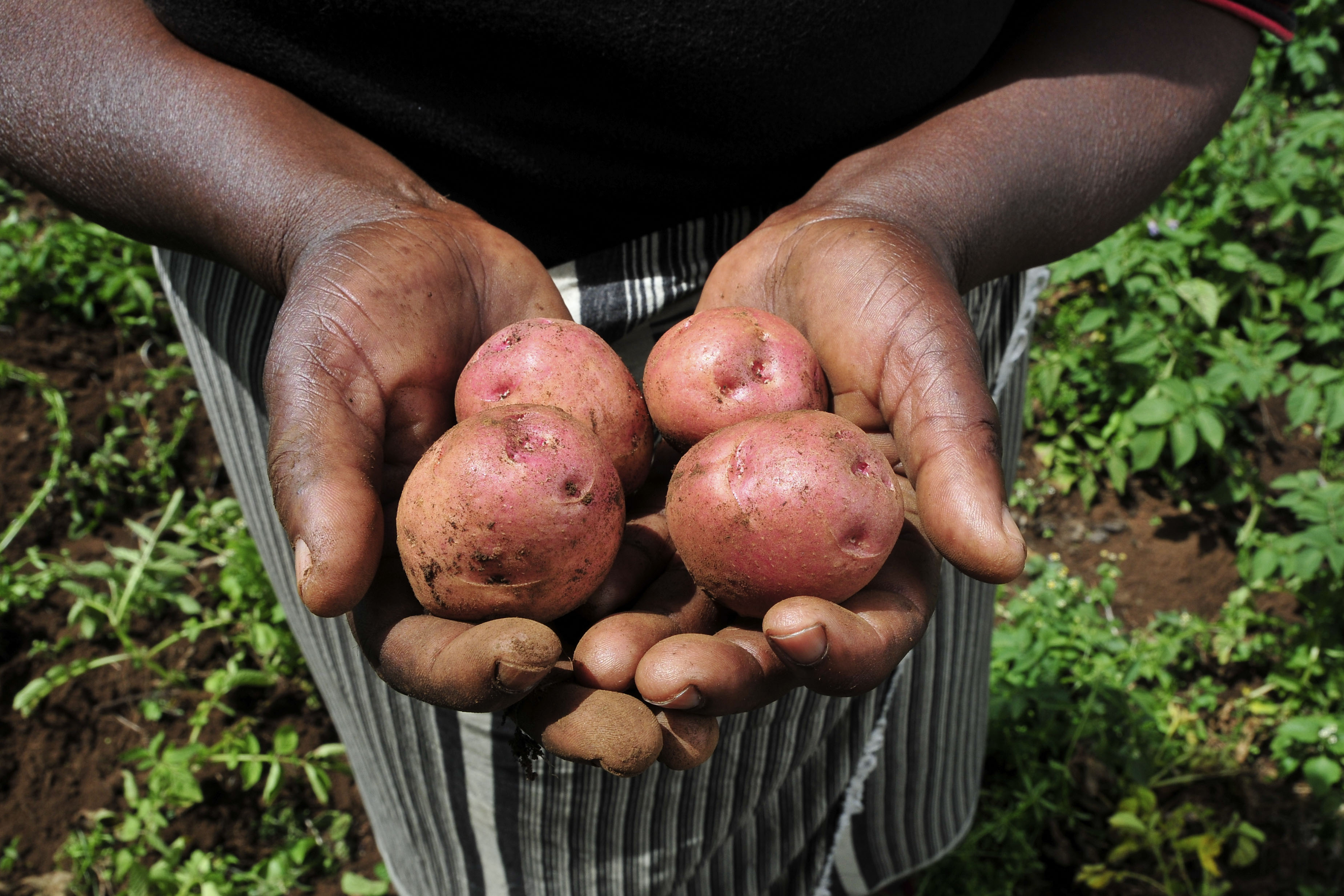
Potatoes harvested from a Kenyan farm.

Agriculture dominates Kenya's economy. 15–17 percent of Kenya's total land area has sufficient fertility and rainfall to be farmed, and 7–8 percent can be classified as first-class land. In 2006, almost 75 percent of working Kenyans made their living by farming, compared with 80 percent in 1980. About one-half of Kenya's total agricultural output is non-marketed subsistence production.

Agriculture is also the largest contributor to Kenya’s gross domestic product (GDP). In 2005, agriculture, including forestry and fishing, accounted for about 24 percent of GDP, as well as 18 percent of wage employment and 50 percent of revenue from exports.

Farming is the most important economic sector in Kenya, although less than 8 percent of the land is used for crop and feed production, and less than 20 percent is suitable for cultivation. Kenya is a leading producer of tea and coffee, as well as the third-leading exporter of fresh produce, such as cabbages, onions and mangoes. Small farms grow most of the corn and also produce potatoes, bananas, beans, peas and chillies.

== History ==
Development of agricultural output of Kenya in 2015 US$ since 1961

=== Pre-colonial period ===
Prior to European arrival, agricultural practices in the interior of Kenya were divided between agrarian and pastoralist societies. Bantu-speaking groups, who migrated into the region by the first millennium AD, introduced ironworking and settled agriculture, cultivating crops like sorghum, millet and cowpeas. In contrast, Nilotic and Cushitic groups practiced diverse forms of pastoralism, managing livestock such as cattle, goats and sheep. These groups often engaged in barter trade, exchanging animal products for grains along border regions like Thika and Limuru.

=== Colonial era (1895–1963) ===
Agricultural policy during the British colonial period was defined by the alienation of fertile land for European settlers. By 1902, the British administration began encouraging white settlers to occupy the "White Highlands," an area of high-potential land that was largely restricted to European ownership.

During this time, the colonial government introduced key cash crops:

- Coffee: First introduced by French Holy Ghost Fathers at Bura in the Taita Hills in 1893.
- Tea: First seedlings were introduced in Limuru in 1903 by G.W.L. Caine, with commercial cultivation beginning in 1924.
- Sisal and Pyrethrum: Also became significant export earners for the colonial economy.

For decades, African farmers were legally prohibited from growing lucrative cash crops like coffee and tea to ensure a steady supply of cheap labour for settler plantations and to prevent competition.

==== The Swynnerton Plan (1954) ====
Following the outbreak of the Mau Mau rebellion, the colonial government sought to create a loyal African middle class through the Swynnerton Plan in 1954. Authored by Roger Swynnerton, the plan aimed to intensify African agriculture by allowing indigenous Kenyans to grow cash crops for the first time and providing for the consolidation and registration of land titles. This led to a dramatic increase in the value of African smallholder output, which rose from £5.2 million in 1955 to £14 million by 1964.

=== Post-independence (1963–present) ===
After independence in 1963, the Kenyan government prioritised land reform and the "Africanisation" of the agricultural sector. The Million-Acre Scheme, advised by David Gordon Hines, facilitated the purchase of expatriate farms in the Highlands to resettle African smallholders.

The post-colonial era saw the rise of the smallholder as the primary driver of the economy. The establishment of the Kenya Tea Development Agency (KTDA) in 1964 helped Kenya become the world's leading exporter of black tea by supporting millions of small-scale growers. While the sector faced challenges in the 1980s and 90s due to fluctuating global prices and the Structural Adjustment Programs (SAPs) mandated by the World Bank, it remains the backbone of the Kenyan economy in the 21st century.

== Production ==
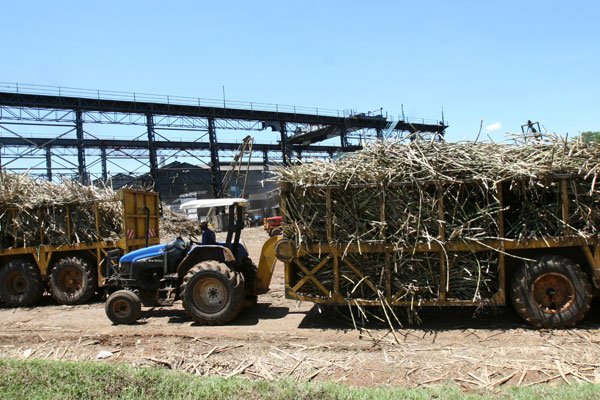
Sugarcane Harvesting in migori, Kenya

Kenya produced in 2018:

- 5.2 million tons of sugarcane;
- 4 million tons of maize;
- 1.8 million tons of potato;
- 1.4 million tons of banana;
- 946 thousand tons of cassava;
- 871 thousand tons of sweet potato;
- 775 thousand tons of mango (including mangosteen and guava);
- 765 thousand tons of beans;
- 599 thousand tons of tomato;
- 674 thousand tons of cabbage;
- 492 thousand tons of tea (3rd largest producer in the world, losing only to China and India);
- 349 thousand tons of pineapple;
- 336 thousand tons of wheat;
- 239 thousand tons of carrot;
- 233 thousand tons of avocado;
- 206 thousand tons of sorghum;
- 188 thousand tons of watermelon;
- 179 thousand tons of cowpea;
- 169 thousand tons of spinach;

In addition to smaller productions of other agricultural products, like papaya (131 thousand tons), coconut (92 thousand tons) and coffee (41 thousand tons).

== Agricultural products ==
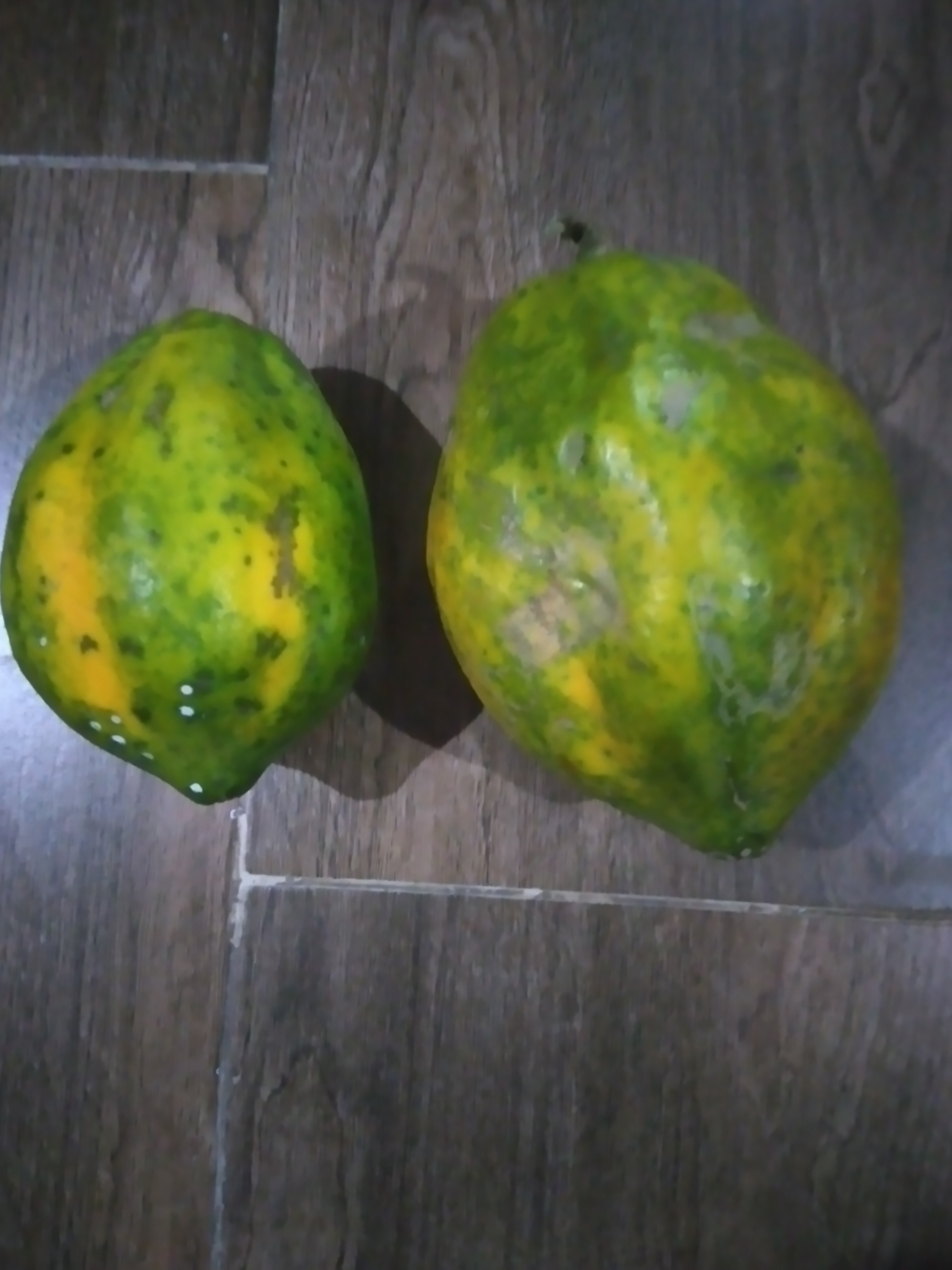
Papaya fruit

=== Sugarcane ===
Sugarcane production suffers from stem borers here. Chilo partellus is an invasive stem borer originally from Pakistan which has displaced the native stem borer pest, C. orichalcociliellus in some parts of the country but not entirely. Ofomata et al., 2000 find C. orichalcociliellus is able to go through all development stages on two native grasses here which do not host C. partellus, which may be one reason for the native insect's persistence.

Cotesia flavipes is a parasitoid also from C. partellus's native home of Pakistan which has been released here by Overholt et al. to serve as a biocontrol. In the season after release, Overholt et al., 1994 found only one parasitized stem borer despite much surveying. The 1995 and 1996 surveys found only a few more successes. Suddenly Overholt et al., 1997 found dramatically increased parasitism and Zhou et al., 2001 found continued increase through 1999.

Sesamia calamistis is another stem borer of sugarcane here. Cotesia sesamiae is present in the country. It is a parasitoid of S. calamistis of larvae.

=== Sweet potato ===
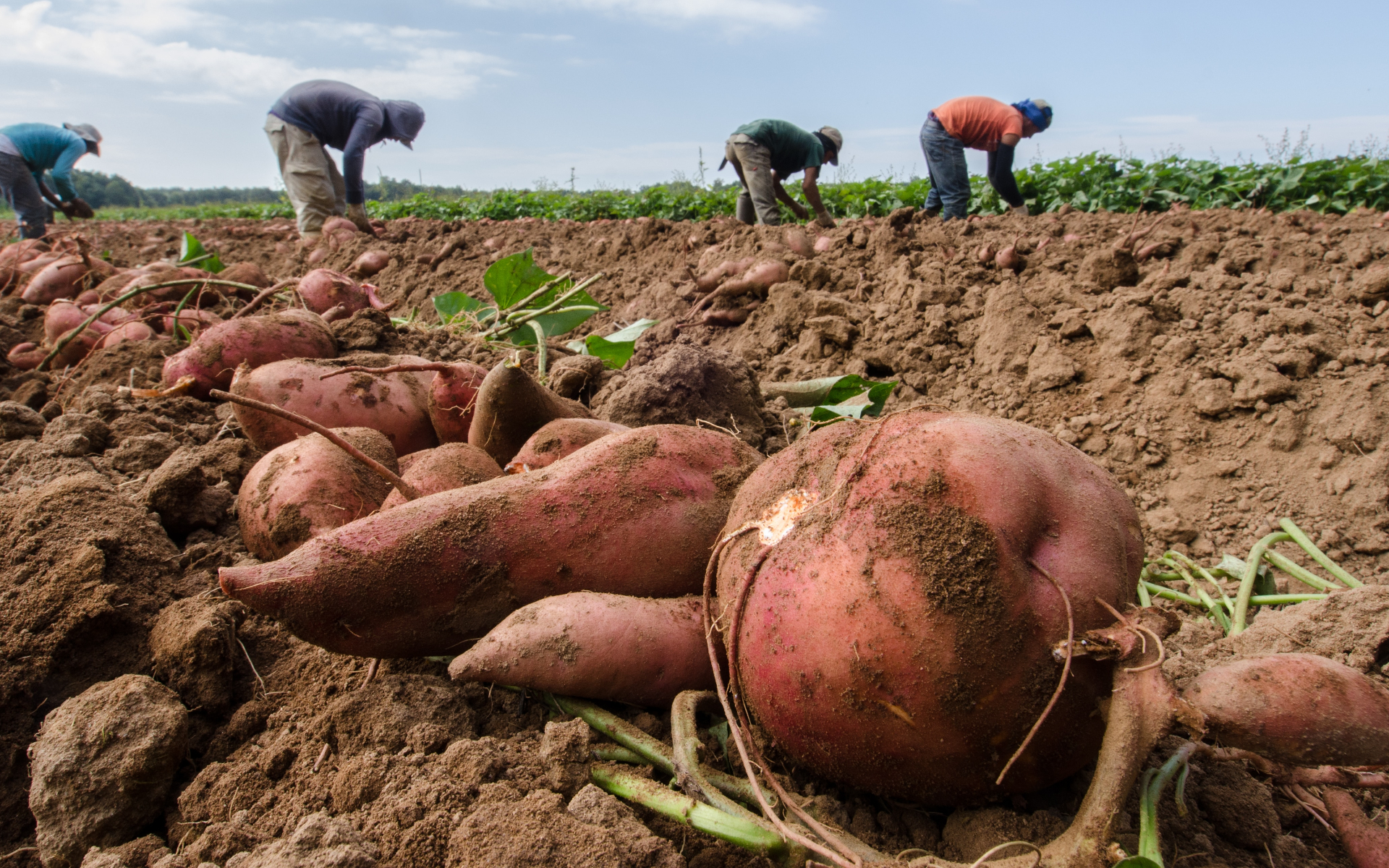
Red sweet potato location of picture is unknown

The most common varieties that Kenyan sweet potato farmers grow are white, red and purple. The yellow-fleshed sweet potato's popularity has increased, due to nutritionists promoting it as a source of vitamin A, which is lacking in the Kenyan diet. The vitamin A deficiency is not fatal, but it leaves the immune system depleted and susceptible to measles, malaria and diarrhoea. The deficiency also may cause blindness.

Despite efforts to develop completely resistant plants, little has been achieved so far. Therefore, attention is turning to pseudo-resistance, which includes mitigating weevil damage through deeper storage roots formation and short-season varieties, which are exposed to weevil infestation for less time. Where farmers piecemeal their sweet potato harvest, there can be up to a 10 percent crop loss due to disease and weevils. Beetle pests can completely destroy sweet potato plantations.

=== Flowers ===
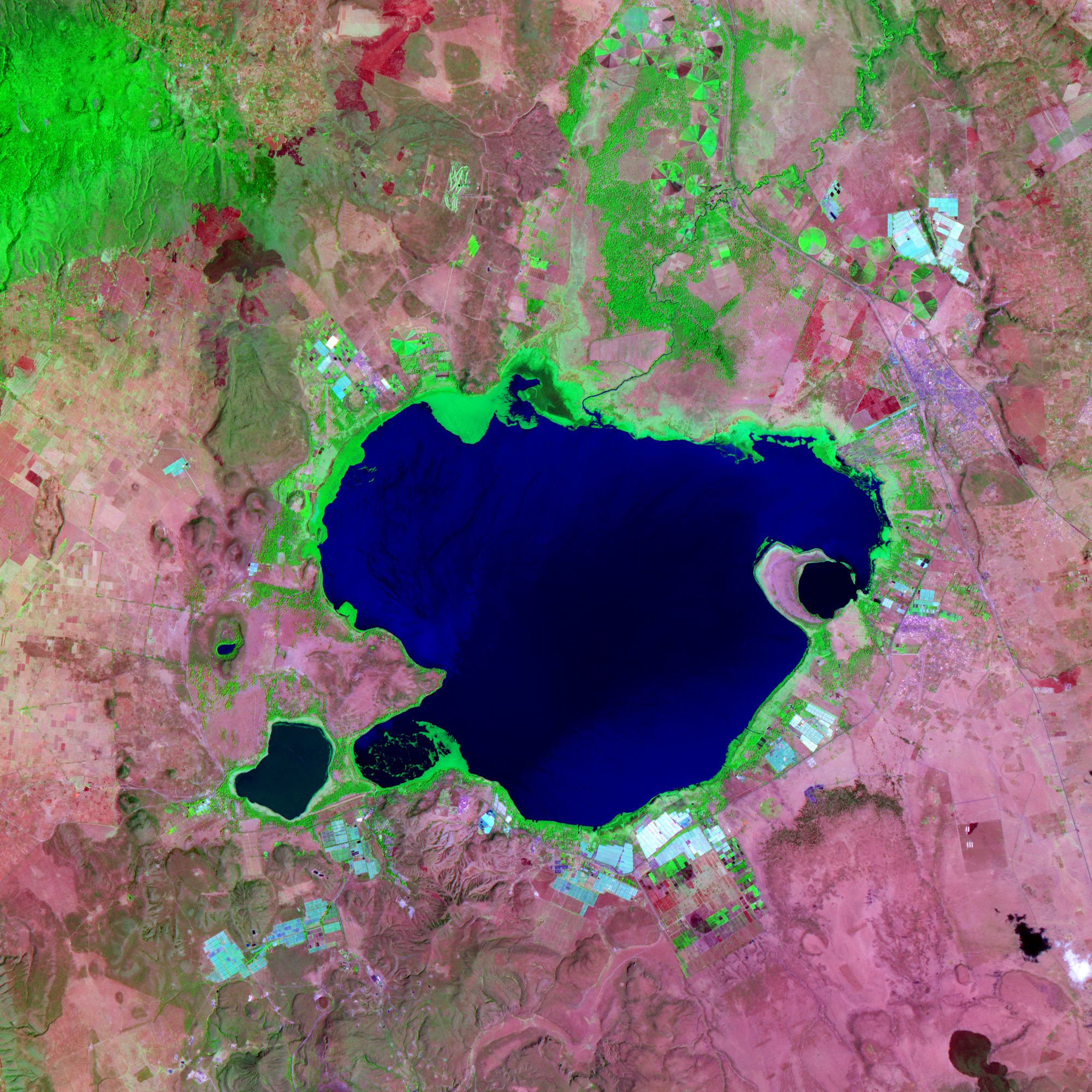
Flower greenhouses around Lake Naivasha. Fresh flowers make up around 10% of Kenya's exports.

Kenya is the world's third largest exporter of cut flowers. Roughly half of Kenya's 127 flower farms are concentrated around Lake Naivasha, 90 km (56 mi) northwest of Nairobi. To speed their export, Nairobi airport has a terminal dedicated to the transport of flowers and vegetables.

The Kenya Flower Council (KFC) says that the flower industry directly employs 90,000 and a further 500,000 indirectly in auxiliary services. Kenyan flowers make up 30 to 35% of flowers auctioned in Europe. Kenya's roses, carnations and summer flowers are also popular in Russia and the U.S.

=== Coffee ===
Small growers are able to increase crop yields significantly by following simple guidelines, such as proper pruning. Many do not at first, because the methods seems counterintuitive, but the practices spread when neighbors that follow the guidelines have better yields.

== Agricultural methods ==
=== Conventional growing ===
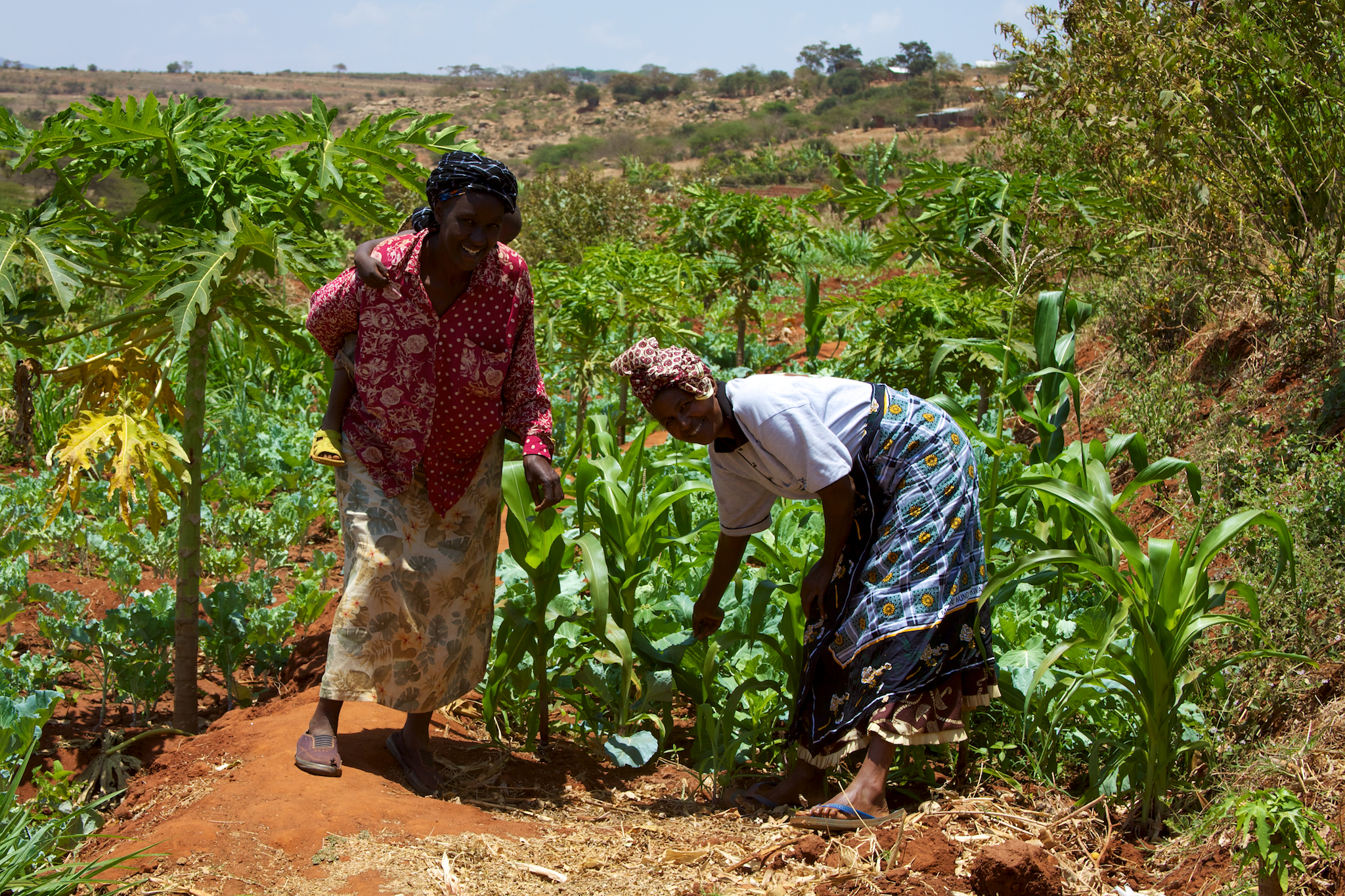
Smallholder farmers in Kenya.

Because of pests, disease and decreased soil nutrients, farmers are rotating their sweet potato plants as much as possible, which means using a field for sweet potato plants only once every 5 years, and not having the crop in the same field for two consecutive years. "Planting rice between two sweet potato crops have long been suggested." When sweet potatoes and rice crops were planted in fields adjacent to each other, the sweet potato weevil infestation level dropped. "Reduced weevil damage was observed when sweet potato was intercropped with proso millet and sesame, but sweet potato yield was also considerably reduced. The sweet potato has been found to inhibit germination of proso millet." This crop rotation and growing pattern is very common in Africa.

Weed control requires many hours of manual labour. Uncontrolled weed growth reduces crop yield by as much as 60 percent. "Some farmers solve this problem by cultivating a smaller area, but this also reduces total yields. Herbicides are too expensive for most smallholders." When the sweet potato plant is propagated a number of consecutive times, the yield decreases and virus build-up increases. "Viruses can be removed by heat treatment.

=== Irrigation ===
Kenya’s irrigation sector is categorized into three organizational types: smallholder schemes, centrally-managed public schemes and private/commercial irrigation schemes.

The smallholder schemes are owned, developed and managed by individuals or groups of farmers operating as water users or self-help groups. Irrigation is carried out on individual or on group farms averaging 0.1-0.4 ha. There are about 3,000 smallholder irrigation schemes covering a total area of 47,000 ha, which is equivalent to 42% of the total area under irrigation. They produce the bulk of horticultural produce consumed in urban centres in Kenya.

The country has seven large, centrally managed irrigation schemes, namely Mwea, Bura, Hola, Perkera, West Kano, Bunyala and Ahero covering a total commanded area of 18,200 ha and averaging 2,600 ha per scheme. These schemes are managed by the National Irrigation Board and account for 18% of irrigated land area in Kenya. Initially, the government developed and managed national schemes with farmers participating as tenants. However, with effect from 2003, NIB handed over to stakeholders responsibility for most services, except for the development, O & M and rehabilitation of the major irrigation facilities.

Large-scale private commercial farms cover 45,000 hectares accounting for 40% of irrigated land. They utilize high technology and produce high-value crops for the export market, especially flowers and vegetables. The farms employ a workforce of about 70,000 persons which is 41% of the population directly active in irrigated agriculture.

=== Organic growing ===
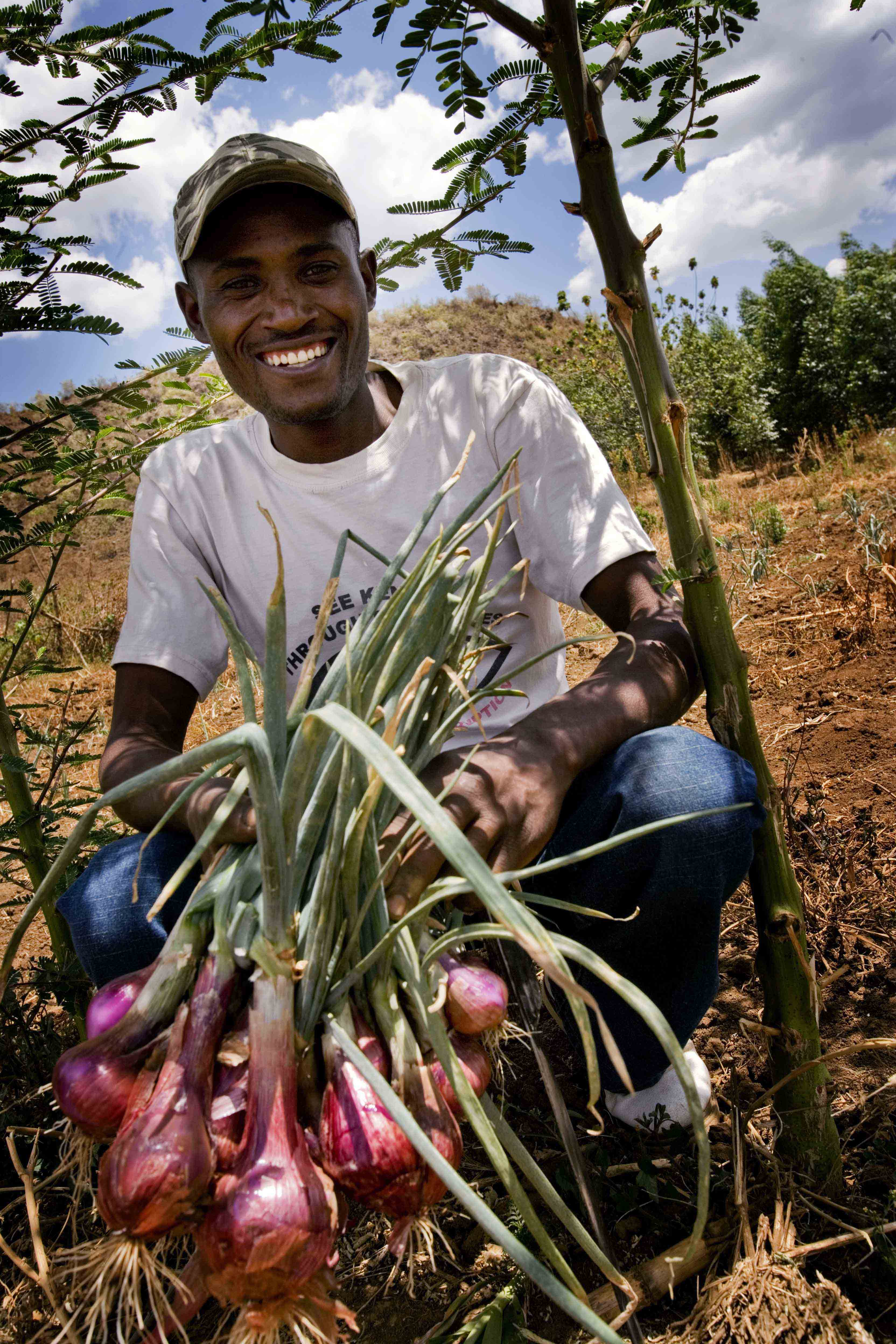
A Kenyan farmer shows some of the onions he has grown to sell on his farm near Gilgil. The farmer is part of a project supported by AusAID.

Sweet potato is typically grown organically in Africa. To decrease labour for weeding, farmers interviewed by Macharia (2004) expressed preference for planting on mounds after trying ridges. Farmers found mound methods yielded larger tubers, and easier to use without new fertilizers or chemicals. Organic farming includes crop rotation, and mulches to control pests and soil fertility.

According, to the Food and Agriculture Organization of the United Nations, Kenya had no percentage of certified organic cropland in 2003, yet farmers use organic methods.

=== Genetically-altered growing ===
Many farmers in Kenya refer to genetically modified (GM) maize delivered by the US as the Trojan horse. GMs are currently illegal in Kenya, although the US continues to send modified maize to Kenya in the form of aid.

Kenyans and other Africans, like Malawians and Zimbabweans, grind maize into flour before distributing it. Some activists have said that the US is purposefully sending GM food as aid to undercut the organic export market and cause Europe to start buying from the US. Other farmers may not be aware of GMs, and others are, as Hollie said, simply too poor.

=== Greenhouse farming ===
To increase production and boost profits, many small-scale farmers in Kenya are adopting greenhouse farming. Some of the popular products being grown in greenhouses include watermelons, capsicum, and tomatoes.

Greenhouse farming in Kenya enables farmers to use less agricultural inputs (including labor and fertilizers) and control pests and diseases. The East African country is classified as a water-scarce country and most of the land is not optimal for agriculture. Most Kenyan greenhouses utilize drip irrigation to maximize the use of the available water and efficiently deliver nutrients to their crops.

== Million-acre scheme ==
David Gordon Hines was seconded by the UK 1954–1962 to advise the Kenya minister of agriculture about the "Million-acre scheme" to buy expatriate farms mostly in the Kenya Highlands.

== Agricultural research by government institutions ==
The Kenya Agricultural Research Institute (KARI) is mandated with relevant research. KARI is the national institution bringing together research programmes in food crops, horticultural and industrial crops, livestock and range management, land and water management, and socio-economics. KARI promotes sound agricultural research, technology generation and dissemination to ensure food security through improved productivity and environmental conservation.

KARI was established in 1979 as a semi-autonomous government institution. The new institute continued research activities from the East African Agricultural and Forestry Research Organisation (EAAFRO), East African Veterinary Research Organisation (EAAVRO) and, finally, the Ministries of Agriculture and Livestock Development. In 1986, the Kenyan government recognised the challenge to meet long-term food production constraints in the country. The Kenya Veterinary Vaccines Production Institute (KEVEVAPI) and the Kenya Tripanosomiasis Research Institute (KETRI) have been integrated into KARI more recently. This was due to the recognition of the need by the government to further strengthen its agricultural research system to create an institutional framework to effectively manage, reorganise and consolidate agricultural research within the country.

By act of parliament the Kenya Agricultural & Livestock Research Organisation (KALRO) was established in 2013. It merged with KARI, Coffee Research Foundation, Tea Research Foundation and the Kenya Sugar Research Foundation and has oversight of 18 research institutes. The new institution has an asset and equity base of KSh 28,000,000,000 and KSh 27,900,000,000 respectively, and 3,294 staff. Likewise, the government has set up some study institutions to aid in research projects in order to alleviate poverty, reduce unemployment and fight malnutrition. Such institutions are like Egerton University set mainly for agricultural research purposes.

== Fishing ==
Coastal fisheries have seen reduced fish stocks. In response, the community of Kuruwitu village in Kilifi County set up their own no-take area in 2003, referred to as a tengefu. This received formal backing from the national government in 2007-2008. The idea has been replicated, with there now being 22 tengefu along the Kenyan coastline. This practice is inspired by traditional resource management, which before the 1920s sometimes saw seasonal closures to protect fish stocks. While there have been a range of effects, some tengefu have seen a marked revival of coral reefs and fish stocks.

== See also ==
- Ministry of Agriculture (Kenya)
- Economy of Kenya
- Coffee Industry of Kenya
- Poultry farming in Kenya
- Tea Production in Kenya
- Agribusiness in Kenya
- Galana Kulalu Project
