= Willy Bett =

Kenyan politician

Willy Kipkorir Bett

Kenyan Ambassador to China

Cabinet Secretary for Agriculture, Livestock, and Fisheries
- In office December 2015 – January 26, 2018
- President: Uhuru Kenyatta
- Preceded by: Felix Koskei
- Succeeded by: Mwangi Kiunjuri

Personal details
- Born: April 14, 1963 (age 63) Kenya
- Education: University of Nairobi (MBA)
- Occupation: Diplomat, politician
- Profession: Politician, business executive
- Known for: Transforming Kenya Seed Company’s financial standing

Willy Kipkorir Bett (born April 14, 1963) is a Kenyan politician and the current Kenyan Ambassador to China. He is the former Cabinet Secretary in the Ministry of Agriculture, Livestock, and Fisheries. He held the post from December 2015 to January 26, 2018. Prior to this, he was the managing director of the Kenya Seed Company. He vastly improved the company's standing, taking revenue from 2.9 billion KES to 5.0 billion KES, and profit from 50 million KES to 434 million KES. Before that, he was a marketing manager at the Kenyan Postbank for 18 years. He holds an MBA from the University of Nairobi.
