= Joshua Shidambasi Odanga =

Kenyan diplomat

Kenyan Ambassador to Somalia
- In office 1974–1976
- Succeeded by: July 2003: Mohamed Abdi Affey

Kenyan High Commissioner to India
- In office 1977–1978
- Succeeded by: 2004-2006: Harry Mutuma Kathurima; Florence Imisa Weche

Kenyan Ambassador to China
- In office April 14, 1979 – December 14, 1985
- Preceded by: Theophilus Arap Koske
- Succeeded by: Jelani Habib

Personal details
- Born: July 5, 1924 Kenya
- Died: August 21, 2016 (aged 92) Shitochi, Kakamega
- Spouse: Rasoah Kavosa Odanga (2012)
- Children: Margaret, Joyce (Tanzania), Patrick, Alan, Jimmy, Harold, Abigael and Jacqueline (USA).
- Relatives: Brother of the late Zablon, the late Jonesi, the late Hannah, Rhoda and the late Shiviriti.
- Education: 1941 Musingu, Lugulu, Kaimosi, Maseno High School.; 1963 College of Social Studies, Thogoto.; 1965 Royal Institute of Public Administration, London.

Joshua Shidambasi Odanga (July 5, 1924 – August 21, 2016) was a Kenyan diplomat.

== Career ==
- From 1942 to 1947 he was employed at the Kenya Post Office of the East African Posts and Telecommunications in the Kenya Colony.
- From 1947 to 1949 he was instructor at the Post Office training School, Dar-es-Salaam and Nairobi.
- From 1949 to 1960 he was employed at the Kenya Post Office, East African Posts and Telecommunications.
- In 1957 he was member of the International Confederation of Free Trade Unions (ICFTU).
- From 1961 to 1962 he was assistant post controller, Regional Headquarters, East African Posts and Telecommunications.
- From 1963 to 1964 he was senior assistant postal controller, East African Headquarters and deputy regional director for Kenya, East African Posts and Telecommunications.
- In 1965 he was member of the Kenya Industrial Court and member of the National Wages Advisory Committee.
- From 1965 to 1969 he was chairman, Agricultural Wages Council.
- From 1966 to 1974 he was regional director for Kenya of the East African Posts and Telecommunications.
- From 1974 to 1976 he was ambassador in Mogadishu (Somalia)).
- From 1977 to 1978 he was High commissioner (Commonwealth) in New Delhi (India)).
- From April 14, 1979 to December 14, 1985 he was ambassador in Beijing (China).
