= Abraham Korir Sing'Oei =

Kenyan lawyer and civil servant

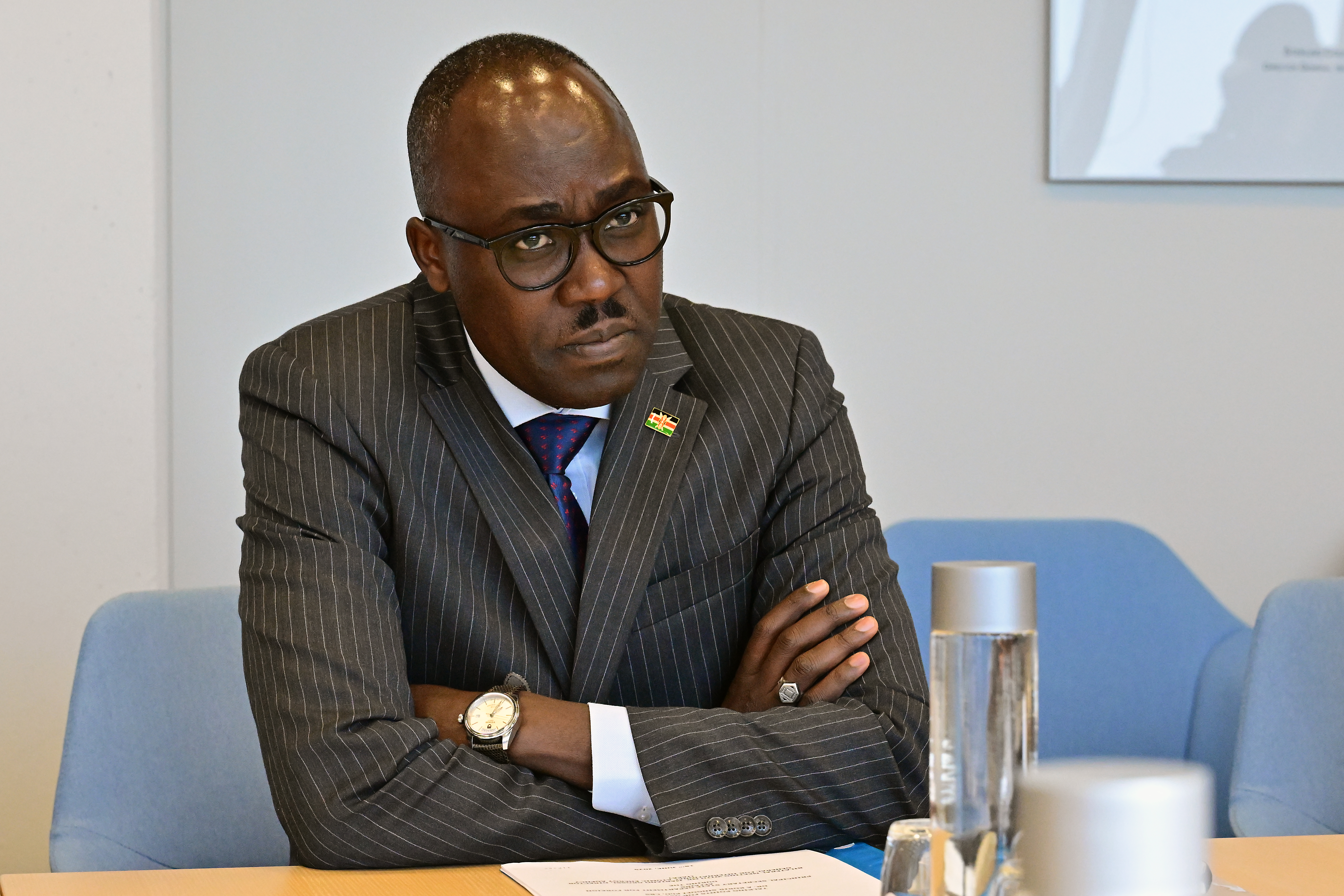
- Sing'Oei in 2025

Principal Secretary, State Department of Foreign Affairs of Kenya
- Incumbent
- Assumed office 27 October 2022
- President: William Ruto
- Minister: Musalia Mudavadi
- Preceded by: Macharia Kamau

Personal details
- Born: 31 December 1973 (age 52)
- Education: University of Nairobi (LLB); University of Pretoria (LLM); University of Minnesota Law School (LLM); University of Cape Town (PhD)
- Profession: Lawyer

Abraham Korir Sing'Oei (born 31 December 1973) is a Kenyan lawyer and advocate of the High Court of Kenya. He currently serves as the Principal Secretary, State Department of Foreign Affairs, Ministry of Foreign and Diaspora Affairs. He previously served as the Senior Legal Advisor to the Executive Office of the Deputy President of Kenya from 2013 to 2022.

== Early life and education ==
Sing'Oei schooled at Moi High School, Kabarak and afterwards attended the University of Nairobi where he graduated with a Bachelor of Law in 1998. He later gained a Masters of Law from University of Minnesota Law School in 2009. He was a recipient of the Hubert Humphrey Fulbright Scholarship by the State Department of the United States to Study Global Public Policy at Humphrey School of Public Affairs at the University of Minnesota. He also has a Master of Laws in Comparative Human Rights Systems from the University of Pretoria in South Africa.

He holds a Doctor of Philosophy in Law from the University of Cape Town, South Africa, obtained in 2021. His doctoral thesis was titled, The impact of government decentralisation on the development and implementation of benefit-sharing laws in Kenya's extractive sector.

== Career ==
=== Legal career ===
Sing'Oei legal career has had him working on the rights of underprivileged, marginalised and minorities in Kenya. He is the co-founder and former executive director of The Center for Minority Rights Development, based in Nairobi.

He co-litigated the Endorois case before the African Commission on Human and Peoples’ Rights, a case that he won considering he represented the Endorois community. The case challenged the government's eviction of the Endorois from their ancestral lands around Lake Bogoria, and in 2010 the Commission found that Kenya had violated several rights under the African Charter. Sing’Oei's work on the case helped draw attention to gaps in Kenya's legal protections for minorities and informed constitutional and land rights reforms.

Sing’Oei also represented Samburu families in a land rights case involving alleged forced eviction of hundreds of residents from land linked to former Kenyan president Daniel arap Moi.

He previously served as Litigation Director at the Katiba Institute and as a Rule of Law Specialist with the United States Agency for International Development.

=== Public service career ===
Sing'Oei was a member of the task force on formulation of community land and evictions and resettlement bills in 2012.

He served as the Legal Advisor and Head of Legislative and Intergovernmental Liaison at the Office of the Deputy President of Kenya, from 2013 to 2022. In 2022 after William Ruto won the presidential elections, he was nominated and later approved as the Principal Secretary, State Department of Foreign Affairs.

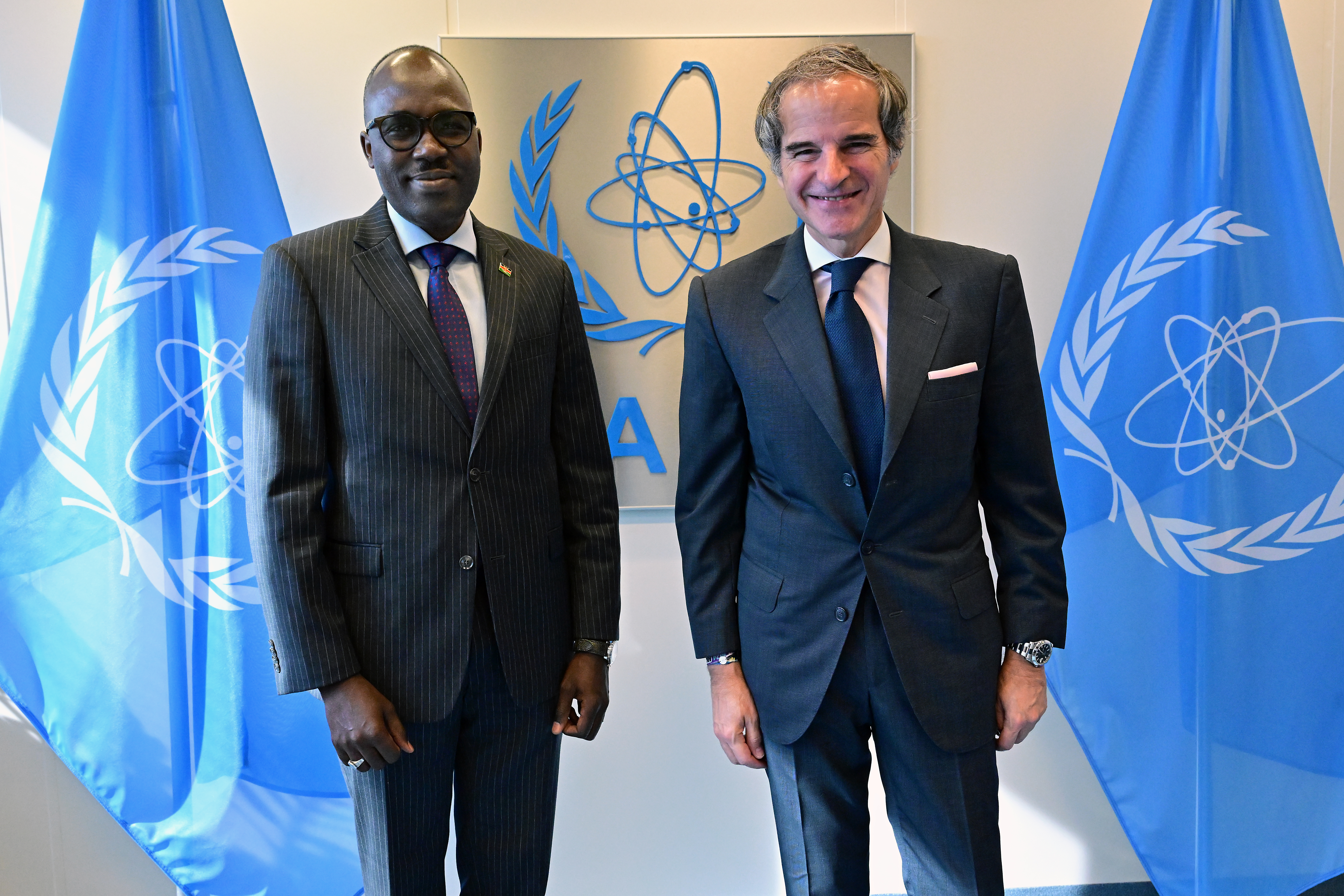
Rafael Mariano Grossi, IAEA Director-General, meeting with Dr. A. Korir Sing'Oei during his official visit to the Agency headquarters in Vienna, Austria, 18 June 2025.

== Publications ==
- Abraham, Korir Sing’Oei. "The rights of indigenous peoples in Africa." Africa's Long Road to Rights/Long Trajet de L'Afrique Vers Les Droits: Reflections on the 20th Anniversary of the African Commission on Human and Peoples' Rights (2008): 13. ISBN 978-1-906387-25-9
- Sing'Oei, Abraham Korir, and Laura A. Young. "LEFT BEHIND: Minority Rights, Transitional Justice and Lessons for Kenya." Interdisciplinary Journal of Human Rights Law 5 (2010).
- Young, Laura A., and Korir Sing'Oei. Land, livelihoods and identities: Inter-community conflicts in East Africa. London: Minority Rights Group International, 2011.
- Sing'Oei, Abraham Korir. "Promoting Citizenship in Kenya: The Nubian Case', Statelessness and Citizenship: A Comparative Study on the Benefits of Nationality, Brad Blitz and Maureen Lynch." Cheltenham and Northampton: Edward Elgar (2011).
- Sing'Oei, Korir. "Engaging the Leviathan: National Development, Corporate Globalisation and the Endorois' Quest to Recover their Herding Grounds", International Journal on Minority and Group Rights 18, 4 (2011): 515–540.
- Abraham, Korir Sing'Oei. "Kenya at 50: Unrealized rights of minorities and indigenous peoples." (2012). ISBN 978-1-907919-21-3
- Young, Laura A., and Abraham Korir Sing'Oei. "Access to Justice for Indigenous Peoples in Africa." (2014): 89–112.
- Laher, Ridwan, and Korir SingíOei, eds. Indigenous people in Africa: Contestations, empowerment and group rights. Africa Institute of South Africa, 2014. ISBN 978-0-7983-0464-1

== Honors and awards ==
Sing'Oei was awarded the Chief of the Order of the Burning Spear (C.B.S.), the First Class distinction of the Order of the Burning Spear, on Jamhuri Day, 12 December 2023.

== Controversies ==
On 20 February 2025, Sing'Oei shared a deepfake CNN video commentary from Fareed Zakaria of CNN on his X account. The fake video was praising Kenya's efforts in the Sudan conflict. His post which drew a lot of attention and debates was debunked to be fake. He later deleted the video and offered a public apology.

== See also ==
- Musalia Mudavadi
- Ministry of Foreign and Diaspora Affairs, Kenya
