= Endorois case =

2010 decision on Indigenous land rights

- Court: African Commission on Human and Peoples' Rights
- Full case name: Centre for Minority Rights Development (Kenya) and Minority Rights Group International on Behalf of Endorois Welfare Council v. Kenya
- Submitted: 2003
- Started: 2005
- Decided: November 2009
- Citation: 276/2003

Case history
- Prior actions: William Yatich Sitetalia, William Arap Ngasia et al v Baringo County Council (High Court of Kenya, 2000)

Case opinions
- The Endorois are an indigenous people. The government of Kenya violated their rights to culture, religion, property, disposal of natural resources, and development.

Laws applied
- African Charter on Human and Peoples' Rights (Articles 8, 14, 17, 21, and 22)

Keywords
- Indigenous land rights; right to development; right to property

Centre for Minority Rights Development (Kenya) and Minority Rights Group International on Behalf of Endorois Welfare Council v. Kenya, also known as the Endorois case, was a ruling of the African Commission on Human and Peoples' Rights (ACHPR) surrounding the removal of the Endorois people from Lake Bogoria by the government of Kenya. The representatives of the Endorois alleged that being removed from their traditional land had violated the rights to culture, religion, property, disposal of natural resources, and development, as defined in the African Charter on Human and Peoples' Rights. The ACHPR found Kenya responsible for all counts of breaching the charter. The Endorois case was a landmark decision on indigenous rights, the first international ruling on the right to development, and the first ACHPR ruling on the definition of peoples or indigenous peoples.

The Endorois, a pastoralist community, historically lived around Lake Bogoria. The Kenyan government removed them from this land between 1973 and 1986 for the creation of a game reserve, which was later used for tourism and ruby mining. Despite promises by the government, the Endorois were only partially compensated, and the reserve did not share its revenue with the community. The Endorois Welfare Council (EWC) filed a case against the government with the High Court of Kenya in the 1990s, but the court ruled that the removal had been legal and the Endorois did not have a claim to the land. Considering it infeasible to pursue the case further in Kenyan courts, the EWC sought to file a case with the ACHPR. It was represented by the international NGO Minority Rights Group International and the Kenyan NGO Centre for Minority Rights Development, which filed a communication with the ACHPR in 2003, alleging that the removal of the Endorois had violated their rights.

The ACHPR admitted the case in 2005 and heard the case in 2009, issuing its ruling November 2009. The ACHPR ruled that the Endorois were an indigenous people and should be recognised as traditional landowners. It ruled violations of the rights to religion, as the Endorois had lost access to religious sites; property, as Kenya had not recognised Endorois land ownership or provided adequate compensation; natural resources, as the Endorois had the right to use and conserve their land; and development, as developments on the land had lacked the free, prior, and informed consent of the Endorois.

The ACHPR recommended that the Kenyan government grant the Endorois complete recognition and access to their land, as well as compensation. The government took little action to implement these recommendations, for which it faced disapproval from the ACHPR and United Nations bodies. Though the Endorois have been granted limited land access and revenue sharing, they have not been granted full ownership, as of 2023. The Endorois decision influenced other cases involving land rights, such as the Ogiek case against Kenya.

== Background ==
=== Relocation of the Endorois ===
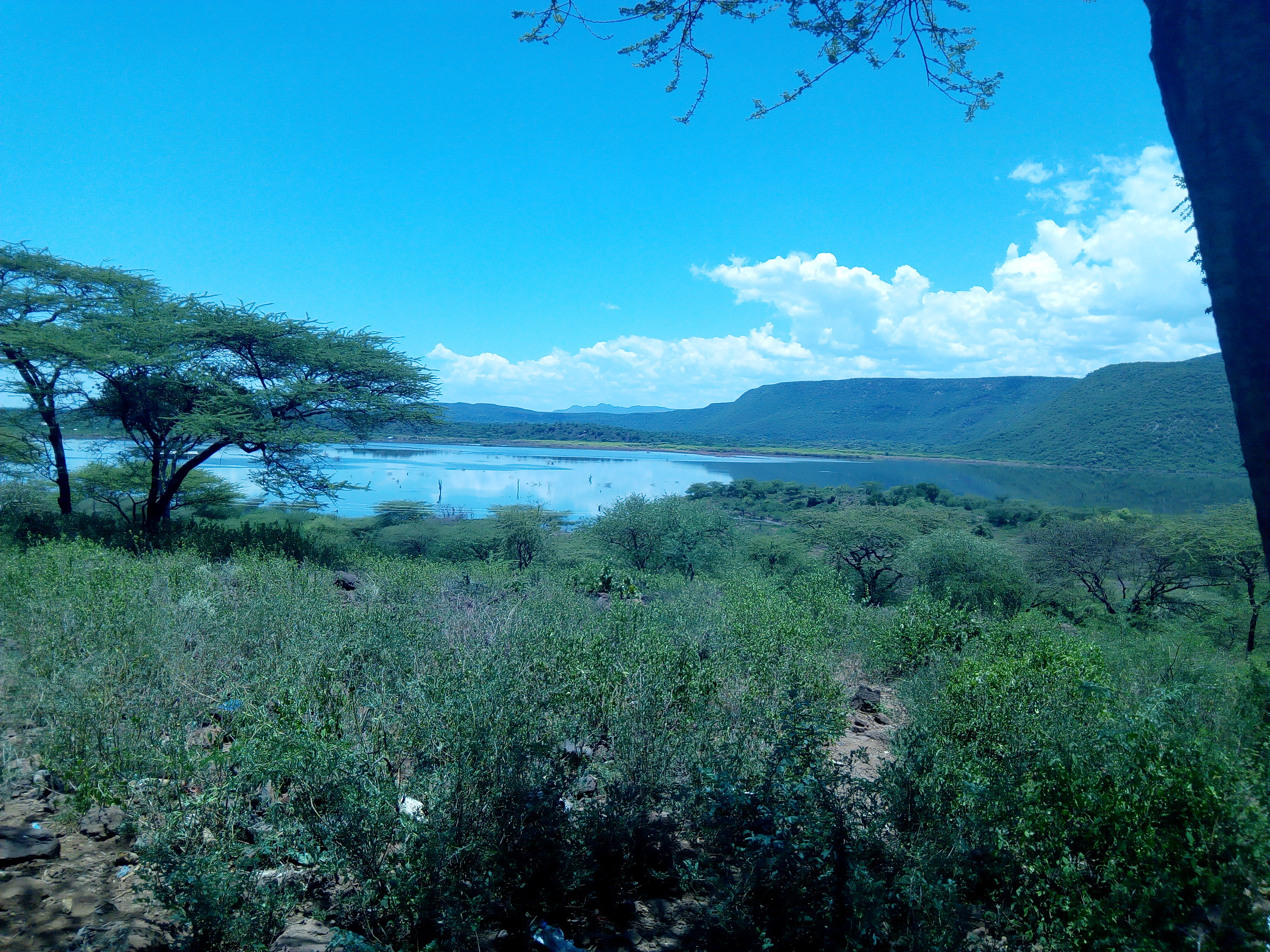
The Endorois were relocated from Lake Bogoria.

The Endorois people historically lived as pastoralists near Lake Bogoria and Mochongoi Forest in western Kenya. The lake is sacred in Endorois culture and was traditionally used for ceremonies. The government of British Kenya granted them indigenous land rights to the area of Lake Bogoria, which independent Kenya initially continued. Under the Trust Land Act, the land was held by the county governments of Baringo and Koibatek on behalf of the Endorois. The Kenyan government held the power to seize the land by eminent domain or under the terms of the Trust Land Act, which allowed it to "set apart" the land for any purpose without consulting the community.

In November 1973, a game reserve was created around Lake Bogoria and 400 Endorois families lost their land. The government said that the each Endorois family would be compensated with 3,150 Kenyan shillings (about 30 British pounds) and that part of the forest would be set aside for their resettlement. The government also promised that it would construct cattle dips and reservoirs and that the Endorois would benefit from 25% of revenue and 85% of employment from the game reserve. However, the community did not receive these benefits, and they were not resettled. Only 170 of the families that had been relocated received the promised 3,150 shillings, which were given in 1986. The recipients of this funding had expected it to be for relocation assistance, but the government said it was complete compensation for their land. More Endorois people were removed from the land in 1983 following an eviction notice labelling them as squatters.

After a meeting with Endorois leaders, President Daniel arap Moi ordered that land be allocated for the Endorois, and plots were established in the early 1990s; however, there were allegations of land grabbing. The Endorois held several protests and community events in following years. The failure of Moi's plan inspired the Endorois to file a court case.

=== Human rights in the African Charter ===
Kenya is a party to the African Charter on Human and Peoples' Rights, a treaty of the African Union (AU) overseen by the African Commission on Human and Peoples' Rights (ACHPR). Provisions of the African Charter include freedom of religion (article 8), right to property (Article 14), right to culture (Article 17), right of peoples to "freely dispose of their wealth and natural resources" (Article 21), and right to development (Article 22).

The African Charter protects people's rights but does not include a definition of peoples. It also does not mention indigenous peoples as the concept was not commonly applied to Africa when the treaty was written. A definition of indigenous peoples of Africa was popularized by a late-20th-century global movement in which communities self-identified with the label based on a history of oppression or marginalisation. Due to this movement, the ACHPR created the Working Group on Experts in Indigenous Populations/Communities (WGIPC) in October 2000 to address the recognition of indigenous peoples of Africa and their rights. This working group defined indigenous peoples using four criteria: "the occupation and use of a specific territory; the voluntary perpetuation of cultural distinctiveness; self-identification as a distinct collectivity, as well as recognition by other groups; and experience of subjugation, marginalization, dispossession, exclusion or discrimination".

Other indigenous rights mechanisms, including the UN's Declaration on the Rights of Indigenous Peoples (UNDRIP) and jurisprudence of the Inter-American Court of Human Rights (IACtHR), described a right to traditionally owned lands and resources. Kenya abstained from voting on UNDRIP, and the country's laws did not recognise indigenous rights. The ACHPR recognised UNDRIP as a source of law in 2007. By 2010, the ACHPR had not made a decision regarding the application of people's rights to indigenous groups. The first ACHPR case to apply people's rights to a sub-national group had been SERAC v. Nigeria (2001), which had declared the Ogoni to be a people. Prior to the Endorois case, this had been the commission's most comprehensive decision about people's rights, although it did not elaborate on what qualifies a group as a people. The African Charter is the only human rights instrument to include the right to development. (Note: Although the Arab Charter on Human Rights also includes the right to development, the African Charter is unique in its implementation.) By 2010, the ACHPR interpreted the right to development as a people's right that that states must protect, and it had not decided a case about the right. This right was also defined in the UN's Declaration on the Right to Development, which urged states to enable the "active, free and meaningful participation" of humans in their development.

=== Pursuit of the case ===
==== High Court of Kenya ====
The Endorois Welfare Management Committee (later the Endorois Welfare Council) was created in 1985. In the mid-1990s, the EWC filed the case William Yatich Sitetalia, William Arap Ngasia et al v Baringo County Council. The case focused on the government's failed promise to share the revenue of Lake Bogoria Game Reserve with the Endorois. The case was brought to the High Court at Nakuru in 1998 and was dismissed. This case was brought to the court again in 2000 and was dismissed in April 2002. It ruled that the removal had been legal under the Trust Land Act as the establishment of the game reserve superseded the Endorois community's land claim and the government had compensated them. The court held that Lake Bogoria was a natural resource and declined to rule on the right to property, stating that the law should not protect land rights based on cultural claims. It also noted that the Kenyan Bill of Rights protected property rights for individuals but not for groups. The court said, "It is now too late to complain. In any case there is no proper identity of the people who were affected by the setting aside of the land to form the game reserve that has been shown to court".

The EWC appealed their case but considered it unlikely to succeed due to the Kenyan judiciary's inefficiency and lack of clarity about the right to appeal. After the High Court case, the government continued to sell the lands of Lake Bogoria, granting a concession to a ruby mining firm in 2002. This mining posed a risk of water pollution. The Kenya National Commission on Human Rights—an agency created in 2002 after the National Rainbow Coalition took power—stated its willingness to participate in discussions with the Endorois about their case.

==== Application to ACHPR ====
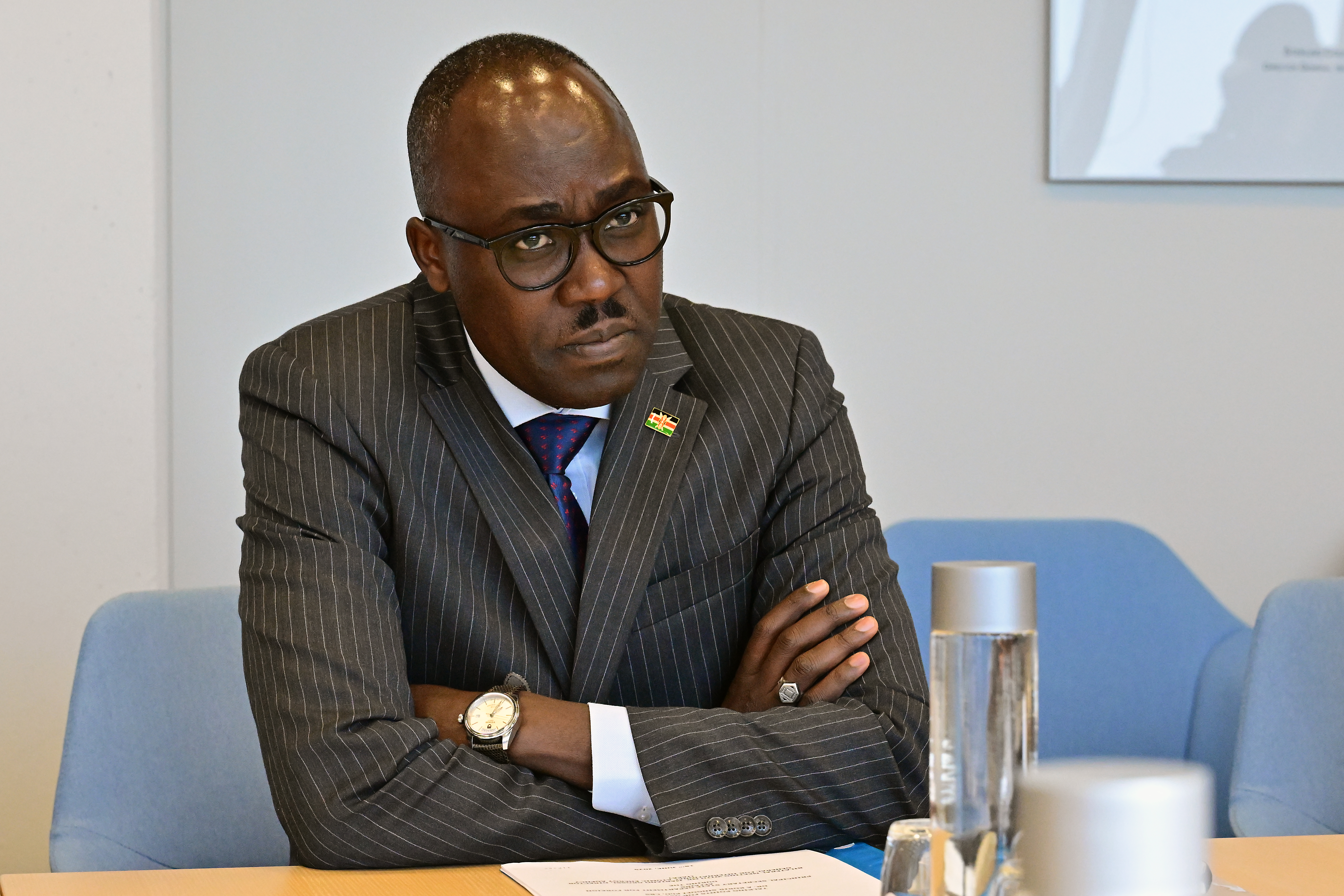
Korir Sing'Oei (pictured in 2025) was the legal strategy director of Cemiride when the organisation took the Endorois case.

Minority Rights Group International (MRG), a British NGO supporting indigenous rights, first worked with the EWC during a pastoralist initiative led by the Centre for Minority Rights Development (Cemiride), a Kenyan NGO. In 2003, MRG took applications for a case with the ACHPR, and the legal strategy director of Cemiride, Korir Sing'Oei, suggested the Endorois case. The head of law of MRG, Cynthia Morel, said the case was noteworthy due to the Endorois community's strong coordination and their specific claim over land not claimed by other groups. The case filed with the ACHPR was different from the one in the High Court, rather than appealing the case.

Cemiride, supported by MRG and the Centre for Housing Rights and Evictions, filed a letter of intent on 22 May 2003. Cemiride and the MRG alleged that the Kenyan government had illegally expelled the Endorois people from their land. According to this communication, the Endorois people were divided, which violated their cultural integrity; (Note: The right to cultural integrity is a broad concept relating to indigenous cultures, which is not defined in the African Charter or other treaties. The EWC claimed that this right had been violated as Lake Bogoria was "inextricably linked to the cultural integrity of the community and its way of life".) relocated to semi-arid land, which denied them access to religiously, culturally, and economically important locations; and excluded from government decisions to sell the land, use it for tourism development, and grant concessions to ruby mining companies. Cemiride and the MRG alleged that the acts violated the African Charter's rights to culture, religion, property, disposal of natural resources, and development. This communication cited the ACHPR's ruling in SERAC v. Nigeria and focused on recently developed jurisprudence of indigenous rights. The Endorois sought the remedies of restitution of their land and financial compensation.

The complainants petitioned to admit the case in August 2003. Kenya argued that the Endorois case was ineligible for the ACHPR as there were further options within the national court system, with the case being pending at the Court of Appeal. The commission sided with the complainants, who said such options would be ineffective, noting that Kenyan law did not recognise collective rights. Another eligibility requirement was that alleged acts must have occurred after the ratification of the African Charter, as it did not apply retroactively. Although the removal of the Endorois had occurred before Kenya's ratification, the case was admitted under an exception for continuing violations.

The case was subject to provisional measures in 2004, and Kenya followed the ACHPR's order to terminate ruby mining on Lake Bogoria. The case was admitted in 2005. The hearing of the case was delayed for three years as the Kenyan government did not meet the ACHPR's deadlines. The ACHPR heard the case during its 41st session and published its decision during its 46th session in May 2009, before issuing its ruling in November 2009 and ratifying it on 2 February 2010. The commission ruled in favor of the Endorois and found the Kenyan government responsible for all violations. The commission's decision cited jurisprudence from African and other human rights mechanisms.

== Decision ==
=== Preliminary questions ===
The commission's discussion of the case began by describing whether the Endorois were a people, as applied to the African Charter, and whether they were indigenous. (Note: Endorois case, paras 144–146) Kenya argued that the Endorois were not a people as they were one of four clans of the Tugen people, in turn a subgroup of the Kalenjin people, and that "modern society" had caused them to lose their unique culture. (Note: Endorois case, paras 140–145, 161) The ACHPR disagreed and said, "the Endorois consider themselves to be a distinct people, sharing a common history, culture and religion." (Note: Endorois case, para 162) It drew on precedent in which it had declared groups including the Ogoni, Katangese, and Black Mauritanians to be peoples. The commission also ruled that the Endorois were indigenous due to the value they placed on their traditional land. (Note: Endorois case, paras 156–157) In addition to citing the WGIPC's definition, the commission's definition of indigenous peoples drew from international precedent, including that of the IACtHR, (Note: The decision cited the IACtHR's decision in Saramaka People v. Suriname which classified the Maroon people of Suriname to be indigenous despite not having originated on the continent. (Note: Endorois case, paras 159–162)) as well as UNDRIP.

=== Rights to religion and culture ===
After ruling that the Endorois were an indigenous people, the ACHPR ruled that their cultural practices qualified as a religion. Its definition of the right to religion was based on the African Charter as well as General Comment 22 of the United Nations Human Rights Council, which states that the concept is "to be broadly construed". (Note: Endorois case, paras 164–168) The EWC alleged that the removal of the Endorois from Lake Bogoria had violated the rights to religion and culture as the lake was integral to the community's religion and its pastoralist culture. Kenya argued that the removal had occurred in accordance with laws, which made it acceptable under an exception listed in Article 8 of the Charter. The commission denied this, as states are not allowed to invoke exceptions listed in the African Charter, and stated that Kenya did not have a reasonable legal justification to limit the right to religion. (Note: Endorois case, paras 80–85) The commission noted that Article 17 requires states to provide for "the conservation, development and diffusion of culture" without mentioning exceptions. (Note: Endorois case, paras 246–251) It said that the stated goal of creating a nature reserve did not necessitate the removal of the population. (Note: Endorois case, paras 172–173) It ruled that the right to culture had been violated as Lake Bogoria was integral to Endorois culture, and they had lost access to sites associated with their beliefs while being relocated to semi-arid land cut them off from natural resources vital to their agricultural practices. (Note: Endorois case, para 251)

=== Right to property ===
The complainants argued that Endorois land was the property of the community as the Trust Land Act and the Constitution of Kenya had granted recognition of their land claims. (Note: Endorois case, para 105) In deciding on whether the right to property had been violated, the ACHPR formulated a description of property rights for indigenous peoples. (Note: Endorois case, para 209) Although the African Charter does not list an explicit right to land, the commission determined that indigenous lands constitute property, based on cases such as SERAC v. Nigeria and Malawi African Association and Others v. Mauritania, which had applied property rights to require the protection of land claims. (Note: Endorois case, para 186) Although Kenya argued that the country had no laws protecting traditional land claims, the ACHPR held that the absence of such law violated property rights. It stated that traditional ownership is equivalent to legal ownership and that governments must protect indigenous groups' ownership of lands rather than merely grant them access to them. (Note: Endorois case, paras 196–207) The commission also held that traditional ownership applies only to resources traditionally used by a group, based on precedent from the IACtHR. Thus, rubies were not a traditional resource of the Endorois, although ruby mining still violated their land rights as it impacted other resources. (Note: Endorois case, para 267)

According to Article 14, limitations on property rights must be "in the interest of public need or in the general interest of the community and in accordance with ... appropriate laws". (Note: Endorois case, para 100) Kenya argued that the removal of the Endorois had been legal (as the government had authority over trust land), that the government had granted them adequate access to their land, and that it had been in the public interest as the goal had been nature conservation. (Note: Endorois case, paras 175–181) The commission held that the requirement for "general interest" was heightened in the case of indigenous peoples due to the importance of their property. It ruled that Kenya's trust land system had not protected the right to property, that forcing the removal of the Endorois had violated the requirement of legality, and that it had been disproportionate to the government's goal. (Note: Endorois case, paras 211–218) It also stated that Kenya had not adequately negotiated with the Endorois before limiting their access to the land, which would have required full consent. (Note: Endorois case, para 60) The commission noted that, according to UNDRIP, indigenous peoples had a right to repatriation or compensation for their land. (Note: Endorois case, para 204) It stated that the financial compensation given to the Endorois was inadequate and "[flew] in the face of common sense and fairness". (Note: Endorois case, para 236)

=== Right to resources and right to development ===
Kenya argued that it had not violated the Endorois's right to resources as the county governments had used their wealth from the game reserve for local developments that the Endorois could still access. However, the commission held that a people had the right to use the resources in its land, as decided in SERAC v. Nigeria. (Note: Endorois case, paras 252–255) The commission considered the right to resources and its connection to the right to property, meaning that an act violating the right was required to be in the public interest. It ruled that Kenya had violated this right as they had limited the community's ability to gain wealth from their land. (Note: Endorois case, para 268) It stated that the goal of creating a nature reserve could have been done with the involvement of the Endorois, who, being from the land, would be "best equipped to maintain its delicate ecosystems", and did not pose a threat to conservation. (Note: Endorois case, paras 235)

The ACHPR formulated a definition of the right to development in this case. It described the right as "both constitutive and instrumental", meaning it was subject to tests of both procedural and substantive law. (Note: Endorois case, para 277) Kenya argued that its developments on Endorois land were beneficial to the Endorois. The commission agreed but ruled that it was not enough to protect their rights. It said, "The result of development should be empowerment of the Endorois community." (Note: Endorois case, para 283) The commission's discussion of this right addressed the concepts of free, prior, and informed consent and freedom of choice, and stated that development required consultation with and consent of communities.

Kenya argued that the community had sufficiently been involved in consultations with mining companies, but the commission sided with the complainants, who argued that the representatives in consultations had not been chosen by the community itself. It noted that the Kenyan government had refused to register the EWC and that the Endorois community members involved in discussions had been illiterate and "were informed of the impending project as a fait accompli". (Note: Endorois case, paras 281, 292) It also disagreed with Kenya's argument that indirect participation through the democratic system was sufficient involvement. (Note: Endorois case, paras 280–283) The commission also held that the right to development requires development to benefit the people. It said that the Kenyan government had instead caused damage by removing the Endorois people's access to resources necessary for development. (Note: Endorois case, paras 297–298)

=== Conclusion and remedies ===
The ACHPR concluded, "by restricting access to Lake Bogoria, [the respondent state] has denied the community access to an integrated system of beliefs, values, norms, mores, traditions and artefacts closely linked to access to the Lake". (Note: Endorois case, para 250) It called for the Kenyan government to recognise Endorois ownership over their traditional land, return them to this land with unrestricted access, give them compensation and royalties for their losses, recognise the EWC, (Note: The EWC received government recognition before the Endorois case concluded.) hold discussions with the Endorois on the implementation of these remedies, and report on this implementation within three months. These directions did not specify a timeline or describe how to delineate the land of the Endorois. While the commission called for projects on Endorois land to pay royalties to the community, it did not require these projects to stop.

== Aftermath ==
=== Reactions ===
The Endorois community hailed the decision as a victory. An Endorois individual, Cheptoroi, said, "That the scary days are gone seems too good to be true." A celebration was held by Lake Bogoria on 20 March 2010. Festivities included rituals performed by elders and the slaughter of cattle and goats. Kenya's Minister for Lands, James Orengo, spoke at the celebration at Lake Bogoria, saying, "The government has no option but to implement the African Commission's recommendations." He said he would write to the Cabinet of Kenya ensuring the decision's implementation.

African indigenous groups celebrated the Endorois case as a victory. Several minority groups in Kenya, as well as elsewhere in Africa and Latin America, asked the chair of the EWC, Charles Kamuren, to consult them on cases. Cemiride took cases from other Kenyan peoples that had land disputes: the Ogiek, who faced eviction from the region of Mau Forest and Mount Elgon, and the Nubians, who claimed Kibera as an ancestral homeland. Human rights groups celebrated the decision's support of indigenous rights, and they placed pressure on the government of Kenya amid other concerns of human rights violations by the country. Commentators including the Endorois expected the Kenyan government to follow the ACHPR's recommendations.

=== Later developments ===
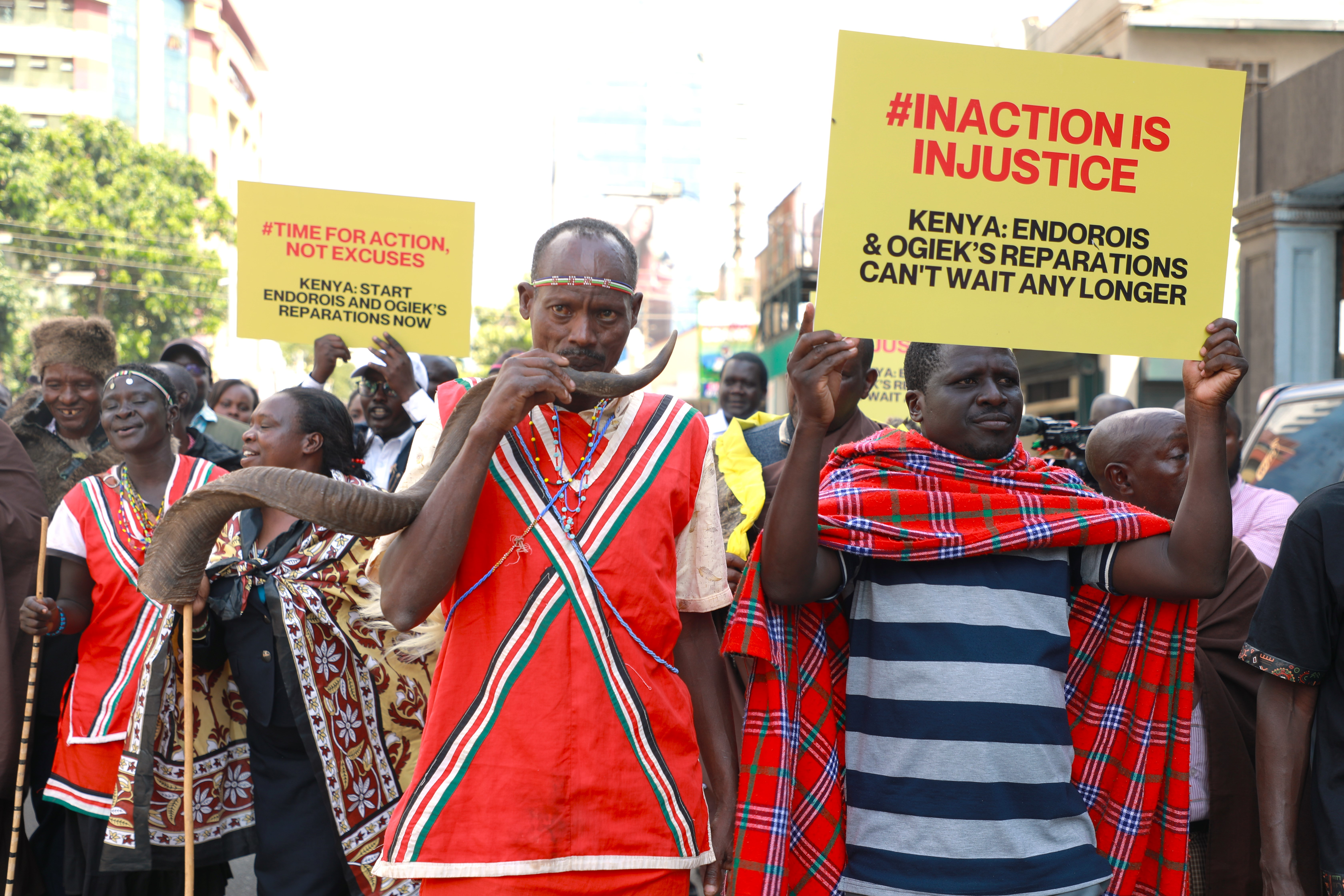
February 2024 protest against the Kenyan government's failure to grant land to the Endorois and Ogiek

The ACHPR did not have the power to enforce its decisions, and the government of Kenya had little political will to enforce the Endorois recommendations. The government did not follow the recommendation delivering a report within three months. The ACHPR and activists such as the Endorois influenced the drafting of the 2010 Constitution of Kenya, which reformed the land law to recognise community ownership. In January 2011, Member of Parliament Ekwee Ethuro asked Orengo why he had not taken action as he had stated; Orengo replied that the government could not yet implement remedies because it had not received a sealed copy of the ruling. The government did not take action after receiving such a copy. During the session of the WGIPC later that year, Kenya's Ministry of Justice stated it would act toward implementation. By 2013, the land remained in the control of the park service, which had control over the Endorois people's access to the land. Meanwhile, some members of the Endorois community voiced disapproval of the EWC for its failure to hold elections or report its finances.

The government of Kenya acted to delay the implementation of the Endorois decision. Kenya applied for Lake Bogoria Game Reserve to be a UNESCO World Heritage Site without the involvement of the Endorois, facing protests from the EWC and other activist groups. The International Union for Conservation of Nature (IUCN) also evaluated it as a natural site without acknowledging the Endorois or the case. The ACHPR issued resolutions calling for UNESCO and IUCN to review their processes to protect indigenous rights, stating that listing the World Heritage Site without the consent of the Endorois violated their right to development. The Kenyan government met with the ACHPR at its headquarters in April 2013 to discuss a plan for implementation of the Endorois decision. Kenya's representative said the plan would be published within three months, but this did not occur. At the ACHPR's 53rd session, WGIPC held a workshop about the decision, which was attended by Endorois leaders but not Kenyan officials. In November 2013, the ACHPR issued a resolution against Kenya calling for implementation. This was the first time it had issued a resolution against a state for non-compliance.

MRG wrote to the African Commission in August 2014, calling for this non-compliance to be referred to the AU, but received no response. Other groups joined the EWC to put pressure on the Kenyan government, including the Kenya Human Rights Commission and the Economic Social and Cultural Rights Network. The administration of Uhuru Kenyatta established a task force for the matter in September 2014, but it did not include any Endorois people and only held one meeting with the community. The task force was not renewed and did not result in action. Bodies of the UN stated disapproval of Kenya's lack of action in 2016 and 2017. In response, the KWS issued a memorandum recognising Endorois land claims. By 2017, the EWS was working with the Colombian human rights organisation Dejusticia, which had worked on other indigenous rights cases.

The Endorois received some financial concessions: the Kenya Wildlife Service (KWS) negotiated with the biotechnology firm Biozymes in 2014 to pay the Endorois for the right to process enzymes found in Lake Bogoria; Baringo County later agreed to share 10% of the nature reserve's revenue; and the reserve employed some members of the community. The government published the Endorois People's Biocultural Protocol on 31 August 2019. It discussed the situation of the Endorois and their land rights, noting the importance of the Endorois case in recognising these rights. This protocol outlined the process of negotiation with the Endorois, legal use of resources on their land, and benefit-sharing. As of 2023, Kenya has not officially returned the land to the Endorois or compensated them. About sixty members of the Endorois and Ogiek communities led a march in Nairobi on 6 February 2024, submitting a letter of demands to the Attorney General. They protested the lack of action to implement the Endorois case and the ongoing removal of the Ogiek.

== Significance ==
The Endorois case was the most comprehensive ruling the ACHPR had yet made. It received coverage by academics and was considered an example of strategic litigation. Commentators have called it a landmark case on indigenous rights in Africa.

The Endorois case was the first decision in which the ACHPR made a ruling on the definition of indigenous peoples or recognised indigenous rights. It made a direct ruling on the African Charter's definition of peoples, unlike the previous Ogoni case, which had only implicitly recognised the Ogoni as a people with a right to land. The Endorois case was one of the first indigenous rights cases after the creation of UNDRIP, although the decision relied on the African Charter rather than UNDRIP. The case set a precedent that protection of indigenous rights required granting peoples ownership of their traditional lands, not only access. The case also held that the right to culture is a collective right, which had not previously been established in international law and would later be agreed by the IACtHR.

It was the first decision by any international body to rule on the right to development. (Note: Although the ACHPR's opinions in cases such as Gunme v Cameroon had noted violations of implied rights based on the right to development, the Endorois case was the first to explicate on the right.) It established a standard for development, requiring free, prior, and informed consent from the landowning people. It was the first ruling to state that this requirement applied to any developments affecting a community, whereas the IACtHR had more narrowly applied it to large projects.

The Ogiek people filed a land dispute case with the African Court of Human and People's Rights, which heavily relied on the Endorois decision. The Ogiek cited the decision in the Endorois case that required states to protect the development of peoples. The Endorois case was also cited by the complainants in Abdalla Rhova Hiribae v. Attorney General, a Kenyan High Court case in which peoples residing by the Tana River alleged violations of their right to development. The court ruled against them, arguing that, unlike with the Endorois, adequate consultation had occurred.

The rulings of the Endorois and Ogiek cases both provided precedent in international human rights law. They were the first cases in the African human rights system to recognise traditional ownership as legal ownership, and they established a requirement of free, prior, and informed consent for development within Kenyan law. The ACHPR's opinion in the Endorois case was reflected in the National Guidelines for Free, Prior, and Informed Consent, written by the Ministry of Environment in 2016.

Although the case did not address the right to a healthy environment (Article 24 of the African Charter), the ruling indirectly protected this right for the Endorois. The rulings of the Endorois and Ogiek cases established a view that indigenous peoples can drive environmental protection.
