= Endorois =

Ethnic group from Kenya

Total population
- 60,000 (2011, est.)

Regions with significant populations
- Lake Bogoria (Kenya)

Languages
- Endorois variety of Kalenjin languages

Religion
- Traditional religion

Related ethnic groups
- Tugen people; Kalenjin people

The Endorois are an indigenous people from the area of Lake Bogoria in the Great Rift Valley region of Kenya. They are a subgroup of the Tugen people, in turn classified as Kalenjin people. They are a pastoralist group that traditionally herded livestock in Lake Bogoria's lowlands and the nearby Mochongoi Forest. In Endorois beliefs, their ancestors originated in the forest, and the lake is the spiritual home of living and dead Endorois. They speak a variety of the Kalenjin languages.

The Endorois lived near Lake Bogoria for centuries before the British Empire claimed it as part of the Kenya Colony. Under the British land ownership system, the area was entrusted to the government on behalf of the Endorois; a trust system continued under independent Kenya. In 1973, the Kenyan government converted the area to a game reserve, requiring the relocation of the Endorois. The Endorois Welfare Council (EWC) was created in 1985 and advocated for the Endorois to return to their land. The EWC filed a case with the High Court in the 1990s, alleging that the removal was illegal, but the court sided with the state. The EWC then filed the Endorois case with the African Commission on Human and Peoples' Rights, alleging that the removal had violated their human rights. The commission ruled in favor of the EWC in 2009 and recommended that the government recognise the Endorois community's land claim. As of 2023, the government has not fully granted the Endorois ownership of the land.

== History ==
=== Early history ===
The Endorois people resided near Lake Bogoria since the pre-colonial era, at least as far back as the seventeenth century. These lands were around Mochongoi Forest, within the Lakipia Plains. Their land claim was recognised by nearby communities. The British Empire claimed the land of the Endorois as part of the Kenya Colony. During this time, the term Endorois referred to a local government area (part of modern-day Baringo County). Authorities considered this area "the most backward location" in the colony. Authorities as well as the Endorois themselves considered the community a subgroup of the Tugen people, the predominant ethnic group of the region. Colonization introduced a system of land ownership in which the central government had power over land rights. The Native Lands Trust Board classified the Endorois land as indigenous land, placing it under traditional land tenure and granting the Endorois freedom over their land. The government administered it under the county governments of Baringo and Koibatek.

Colonial authorities created the classification of Kalenjin people, of which the Tugen were classified as a tribe. The Kalenjin began self-identifying as an ethnicity in the 1950s and 1960s. The Tugen, including politician Daniel arap Moi, played a large role in creating this identity. Endorois leaders continued to label themselves a subgroup of the Tugen, in part due to their similarity in languages and out of solidarity with Moi.

=== Relocation ===
After the independence of Kenya in 1963, land controlled by the Native Lands Trust Board was transferred to county councils. Endorois land was entrusted to Baringo County on behalf of the Endorois, under the Trust Land Act and the Constitution of Kenya. The Endorois continued to live on the land until the government of Kenya gazetted Mochongoi Forest as a game reserve. The Lake Hannington Game Reserve (later Lake Bogoria Game Reserve) was established in November 1973, of which the Endorois were not informed until 1977. As a result, 400 Endorois families were coerced into leaving the land. They were relocated to a semi-arid area where the majority of their livestock did not survive and potable water was not available. They were also exposed to cattle raids from the Pokot people. The community's food supply became reliant on humanitarian aid. The government developed tourism in the game reserve, constructing roads, game lodges, and a hotel. Remaining Endorois were subject to a 1983 eviction notice labelling their residence as illegal, and some of their houses were burned. The eviction took place after that year's general election.

The Endorois Welfare Management Committee (later the Endorois Welfare Commission; EWC) was created in 1985. Its first chair was Peter Changole, a teacher. The government refused to recognise the organisation. Endorois leaders met with Moi, by then the President of Kenya, on 28 December 1994 at Lake Bogoria. He issued a directive for land in the Mochongoi Forest to be re-gazetted and allocated to the Endorois. According to the EWC, Moi issued the directive a second time in November 1995, but it was not realised either time. Five-acre parcels were created for 312 people in the early 1990s. This was subject to allegations of land grabbing; according to a later account by Kiplenge, it was "hijacked by powerful politicians in Baringo and Koibatek districts to settle their own people".

Endorois protestors led a barricade in October and November 1995, blocking the road to Lake Bogoria and calling for land compensation. This led to eleven charges of unlawful assembly. Juma Kiplenge, a lawyer who served as chair of EWC in the 1990s, faced death threats and was arrested twice—in August 1996 for leading the unregistered EWC and in 1997 for leading an Endorois Cultural Festival without permission—with poor prison conditions. This gained the attention of Amnesty International which said he had "suffered repeated harassment because he has taken on cases which the authorities do not want pursued" and agreed to take his case. Charles Kamuren, who had served as EWC's secretary since 1985 and would become its president in 2003, was also arrested several times.

=== Judicial cases and aftermath ===
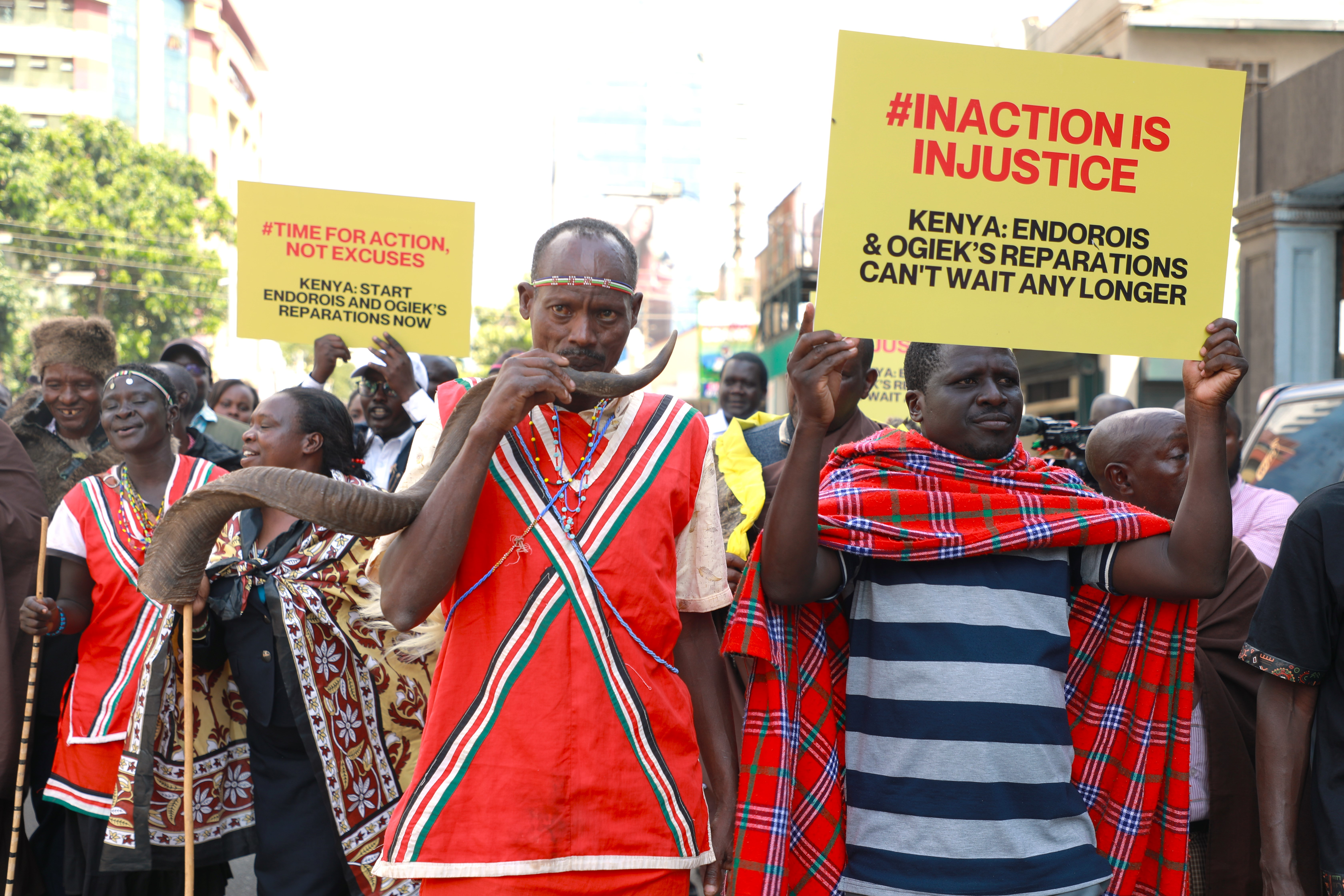
A protest against the Kenyan government's failure to grant land to the Endorois and Ogiek

The EWC filed a case against the government in the mid-1990s, alleging that it had failed to share the revenue of Lake Bogoria Game Reserve with the Endorois. The High Court at Nakuru dismissed the case in 2002. It ruled that the removal had been legal under the Trust Land Act as the establishment of the game reserve superseded the Endorois community's land claim and the government had compensated them. It said that Kenyan law did not recognise traditional land claims.

After rubies were discovered to the north of Lake Bogoria, the government granted a concession to the Canadian mining company Corby Limited in 2002. In November 2004, the opening of the mine was blocked by protestors. Kamuren said that he received a threatening letter from the District Education Officer days after this protest. The discovery of rubies, along with the discovery of an enzyme used to develop a bleach formula, contributed to feelings among the Endorois that they were being excluded from the wealth of Lake Bogoria.

The NGOs Minority Rights Group International and Cemiride—both of which had worked on a pastoralist initiative with the EWC—chose to take the case surrounding Endorois land claims in 2003. They wrote to the African Commission on Human and Peoples' Rights (ACHPR) that year, alleging that, in removing the Endorois from their traditional lands, Kenya had violated the Endorois people's rights to religion, culture, property, natural resources, and development. The ACHPR admitted the case Centre for Minority Rights Development (Kenya) and Minority Rights Group International on Behalf of Endorois Welfare Council v. Kenya in 2005. The ACHPR issued its ruling in 2009, finding Kenya guilty of all violations, and recognising the Endorois as an indigenous people. It recommended that Kenya recognise the Endorois community's land claim, grant them complete access to the land, and compensate them for their losses. The Endorois initially anticipated the government would follow these recommendations, but the government took little action.

UNESCO listed Lake Bogoria as a World Heritage Site in 2011 despite complaints by the EWC that the Endorois had not been involved. In 2013, Grace Jelagat Kipchoim became the first Endorois person elected as a member of parliament for the Baringo South Constituency. The government began sharing profits from enzyme extraction with the Endorois in 2014. The Kenyan government published the Endorois People's Biocultural Protocol on 31 August 2019, a report on the community's use of resources on their land. The report noted the community's climate change adaptation measures; the Endorois had implemented sustainable farming practices such as more diverse and drought-tolerant crops, as well as destocking and supplementary feeding of livestock. They also supported their culture's environmental values through ecotourism. UNESCO began including the community in the management of Lake Bogoria in a plan published in 2021. However, many Endorois people were removed from Mukutani Forest, a protected area created by the Kenya Forest Service in 2017 without the community's permission. By 2022, over 10,000 Endorois were relocated from this land to the towns of Marigat, Nyimbei, and Sandai; an individual's request to return to the land in 2024 was denied.

By 2023, Kenya had not granted the Endorois full rights to the land, and the community faced extreme poverty. Meanwhile, water level rise of Lake Bogoria destroyed residential, cultural, and economic sites, including drinking water sources and the lake's only healthcare facility. Unauthorised extraction of enzymes from Lake Bogoria also continued, according to Endorois leaders in 2025.

== Demography ==
The Endorois are a clan of the Tugen people, a subgroup of the Kalenjin people. At the time of the Endorois case, their population was 60,000, or 400 families. Although the 2019 Kenya Census recorded that there were 45,000 Endorois people, this may have been an undercount. They speak a variety of the Kalenjin language cluster, most closely related to the Tugen and Keiyo languages. As of 2024, the Endorois people live in Kapkun Village, Marigat Division, Baringo South.

The Endorois widely feel a kinship with the rest of the Tugen peoples. Kiplenge described the Endorois as "a subtribe of the Tugen-Kalenjin tribe". Many Endorois people say the community's identification as a distinct indigenous group is for strategic purposes. However, according to Charles Kamuren, the fifth chair of the EWC, the Endorois had always been a distinct group but, until the 1980s, had been convinced otherwise by politicians and Tugen elite.

== Culture ==
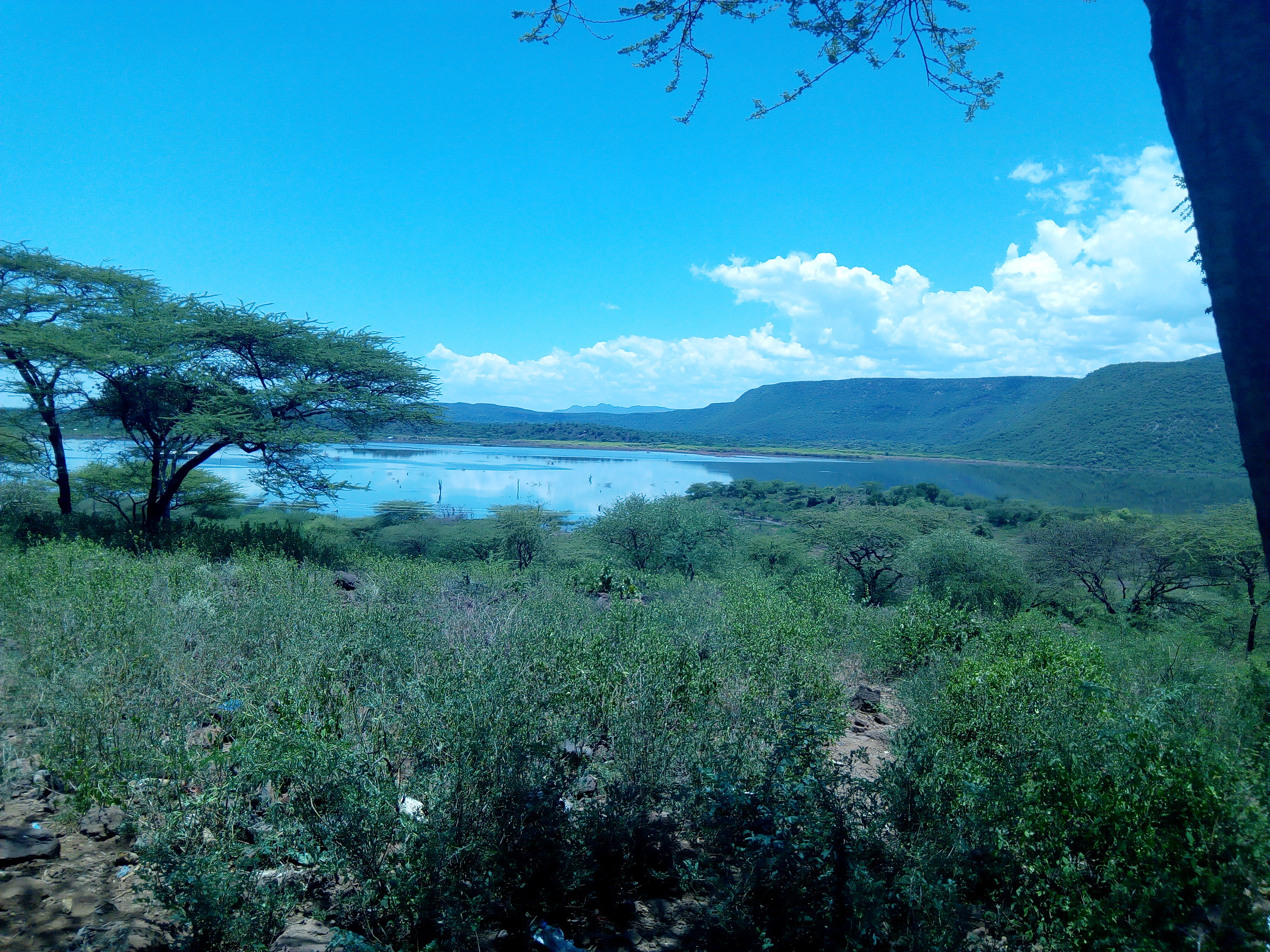
Lake Bogoria features in Endorois culture and beliefs.

The Endorois people are pastoralist and semi-nomadic. The livelihoods of the Endorois are dependent on the grazing of livestock—sheep, goats, and Zebu cattle. Traditionally, this involved herding the animals in Mochongoi Forest during the dry season and the lowlands of Lake Bogoria during the wet season. Lake Bogoria is highly culturally valued as livestock feed from its pastures and salt licks. This Endorois also traditionally kept bees on this land. A wild nightshade called kisochon was traditionally a major part of Endorois cuisine and was harvested weekly when grains were out of season. Kisochon was eaten as a side dish for ugali and was also integral to special occasions. However, it has lost popularity due to its bitter taste and has become endangered amid a decrease in soil quality.

The Endorois community is traditionally governed by elders. The community is divided into clans, each with a natural phenomenon (such as a plant or animal) as its totem.

According to Endorois beliefs, Lake Bogoria is the spiritual home of the Endorois, including the souls of the dead. Religious sites exist around the lake. The area is used for a large annual festival and smaller, more frequent ceremonies, including funerals, weddings, circumcisions, and initiations. It also has sites for prayers and burials. Unlike other Kalenjin peoples, the Endorois do not believe themselves to have migrated from elsewhere. Endorois folklore says that Mochongoi Forest was the home of their ancestors and the location of the first Endorois settlement. In the creation of their indigenous identity, the Endorois began referring to the forest as their "birthplace".
