= Bill Kipsang Rotich =

Kenyan actor

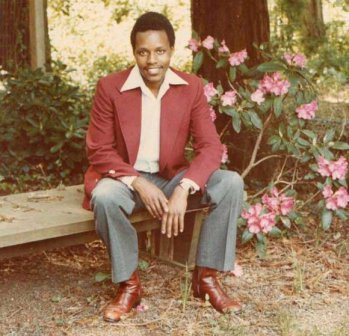
- Born: 1958 (age 67–68); Eldama Ravine, Koibatek, Kenya
- Other name: Kipsang Rotich
- Education: Dominican University
- Occupations: Voice actor, businessman
- Known for: Voice of Nien Nunb in Star Wars

Bill Kipsang Rotich, also known as Kipsang Rotich, is a voice actor best known for voicing the character Nien Nunb in the Star Wars films.

== Early life ==
Bill Kipsang Rotich was born in 1958. Eldama Ravine, Koibatek, Kenya.

== Education ==
Rotich attended Eldama Ravine Mission Primary School for his primary education and later joined Nairobi School for his high school studies. After completing his secondary education he attended Dominican University in San Rafael, California. It is during this time that he landed the role to play the voice of Nien Nunb in Return of the Jedi.

== Voice of Nien Nunb ==
Rotich voiced Nunb by speaking in Kalenjin and Kikuyu, both of which are spoken in Kenya. This turned him into a celebrity in Kenya because audiences there could understand what Nien Nunb was saying. Rotich then put a hold on his acting career and decided to pursue business.

== Return to voice acting ==
After 32 years, Rotich was located by Star Wars producers to be the voice of Nien Nunb once more in Star Wars: The Force Awakens. He reprised the role in Star Wars: The Rise of Skywalker, Lego Star Wars: The Force Awakens, Star Wars: Rise of the Resistance, and Lego Star Wars: The Skywalker Saga.
