= Musa Sirma =

Kenyan politician

Musa Cherutich Sirma is a Kenyan politician. He is the former minister for East African and Regional Cooperation in Kenya and a former member of parliament for the Eldama Ravine Constituency.

== Political career ==
He was reelected as an MP in the 2022 general election.
