= Rights-based approach to development =

Rights-based approach to development is promoted by many development agencies and non-governmental organizations (NGOs) to achieve a positive transformation of power relations among the various development actors. This practice blurs the distinction between human rights and economic development. There are two stakeholder groups in rights-based development—the rights holders (who do not experience full rights) and the duty bearers (the institutions obligated to fulfill the holders' rights). Rights-based approaches aim at strengthening the capacity of duty bearers and empower the rights holders.

== History ==
=== Human rights into development discourse ===
Human rights came into global discourse after the United Nations passed the Universal Declaration of Human Rights in 1948. This was the first global recognition that all humans inherently have certain rights. United Nations endorsement of democracy had little to do with the UN's stance on development. Human rights became one of the major debates between the West and Communist states during the Cold War. Cold War dichotomy of right versus left defined power of the state and of the individual in aspects of society based on political affiliation. The end of the Cold War and the fall of the Soviet bloc left Western values and ideas, which remain one of the main ideologies of the world.

Human rights organizations such as Human Rights Watch and Amnesty International used to focus primarily on documenting human rights violations on the civil and political level. No longer do these organizations focus solely on human rights violations, but also on social, economic, and cultural rights. The evolution of human rights organizations and development organizations and the western idea that rights are asserted through responsibilities, duties, transparency, trust, and accountability have led to the development of the rights-based approach. In 1993 the UN held the World Conference on Human Rights in Vienna; during this conference they developed the Vienna Declaration and Programme of Action, where they linked democracy, human rights, sustainability and development. This made the Cold War division of Civil and Political Rights and Economic Social and Cultural rights interdependent. This further led to the linkage between human rights and development and enabled policy makers and developers to incorporate a rights-based approach into their policies.

In 1997, the Secretary General to the United Nations called to mainstream human rights into all work of the United Nations. Then in 2003, various organizations and agencies met to develop a "Common Understanding" of a human rights-based approach, consisting of six main principles:

- Universality and Inalienability
- Indivisibility
- Inter-Dependence and Inter-Relatedness
- Equality and Non-Discrimination
- Participation and Inclusion
- Accountability and Rule of Law

The United Nations developed this guide to address the significant changes occurring in the international development community with the adoption of human rights in development work. Since the UN published their standards and steps to a rights-based approach to development, many bilateral donor agencies, such as CIDA and DFID, and international NGOs such as CARE and Oxfam have taken similar steps.

=== Transition away from welfare model ===
The welfare model has been rooted in Western developmental practices since the 20th century. In the welfare model, poverty is defined as the absence of a public good or knowledge. If the state or another vehicle, such as an NGO, provides the absent good, then poverty can be alleviated and development will occur. Billions of dollars have been poured into this approach, however despite some achievements there has not been success with this model. The gap between the rich and poor is widening and according to the World Development Report, nearly half of the world's population live on less than $2 a day.

This model lacks a way to hold governments accountable for their actions or inaction. It fails to address governments' inability to fulfill their citizens' rights either because of funding or knowledge. It also constructs the poor as objects of charity, predetermining their roles in civic society.

Due to the failures of the welfare model, NGOs reevaluated and transitioned more towards a rights-based approach to development. In this model, instead of the poor being constructed as charity they would be constructed as actors or rights holders. The NGOs' role is to help the poor overcome obstacles blocking their rights and give governments the tools and training to provide these rights.

== Theories ==
=== Human rights ===
The inclusion of human rights into development discourse has also brought along a certain language of rights. This brings a moral resonance to development rhetoric and makes it hard to avoid in today's discourse. Rights are defined as entitlements that belong to all human beings regardless of race, ethnicity, or socio-economic class; all humans, therefore, are rights holders, and it is someone's duty to provide these rights. Who is responsible to give these rights, in other words the duty bearers, has been largely debated. In rights-based approach it is the person's government that assumes the duty bearer position, but most of the time the said government does not have the resources to fulfill this role. This is where the NGOs come and try to help these governments fulfill their roles and duties to their people by giving them resources. These resources can be monetary or more sustainable such as training to government officials.

Currently there is an under-fulfillment of human rights, which has been directly linked with poverty. Poverty includes the assessment of standard of living, health, and well being. These are social and economic human rights, which have just recently been included in development discourse. First generation rights, or civil and political rights, have dominated public policy in the past. However, with poverty on the rise and public policy failing, social and economic rights are becoming increasingly important in development of policies.

Affluent or rich countries feel they should help the poor out of charity or humanity. Rights-based approach works to shift the paradigm away from charity and towards moral duty imposed on the world through the international consensus of human rights. NGOs are adopting the "full spectrum" of human rights into their development policies. Using human rights as their driving force, they are using rhetoric to develop a modus operandi that made political human rights effective.

=== Capacity building ===
Capacity building is the ability of individuals, institutions, and societies to perform functions and solve problems. A goal of rights-based approach to development is to increase the capacity of both the duty bearers and the rights holders.

Key principles to increase capacity are sought to build upon existing capacities, ensure national engagement and ownership, and adjust to countries' needs as development occurs. In this method, the duty bearers and the rights holders both have an active role in development. The duty bearers are accountable for respecting, protecting, and fulfilling human rights; while the rights holders need to ask what they should do to help promote and defend their freedoms. This action keeps their governments accountable for creating sustainability.

Capacity building is an ongoing process, and is often intangible. This is why many nonprofit organizations have not been able to engage or transition more towards capacity building. Donors like to see tangible results or they like to see where their money is going. Also the success of nonprofit and NGOs is shown through tangible results, leading organizations more toward service delivery than capacity building.

=== International law ===
The international recognition of human rights has been largely debated; there is acknowledgment but not institutional enforcement. NGOs that use a rights-based approach in policy decisions have a large problem with gaining legal status or enforcement of the human rights they are defending. They rely on publicly criticizing countries who make these violations.

There have been many international legal documents developed by the United Nations on behalf of human rights issues that all members of the UN have to abide by.

- The Covenant on Economic, Social, and Cultural Rights (ICESCR)
- The Covenant on Civil and Political Rights (ICCPR)
- The Convention on Elimination of Racial Discrimination (CERD)
- The Convention on Elimination of all Forms of Discrimination Against Women (CEDAW)
- The Convention on Rights of the Child (CRC)
- The Convention Against Torture (CAT)
- The Convention on Migrant Workers and Their Families (MWC)

Since the 1948 adoption of the Universal Declaration of Human Rights the international community has developed a legally binding framework for the protection of human rights. These legal documents have created norms and standards internationally.

=== Social contract theory ===
The social contract theory proclaims that rights such as life, liberty, and property belong to the individuals and not to society. These rights existed before individuals entered civil society and by entering civil society, one is agreeing to a social contract. In this contract, the state has the right to enforce natural rights. The state breaks this contract if the rights of the people are broken or not secured. Today, social contracts come in the form of national constitutions, which provide rules explaining and protecting individual rights.

These rights are inherent, they are not granted by authority or any overriding principle. Human rights are recognized by all people making it universal and fundamental.

=== Downward accountability ===
Within the realm of rights-based approach there is a theoretical relation to downward accountability in relation to development. This theory states what the rights are, who deserves the rights and what actors are responsible for ensuring these rights are secured. In development there is a focus on the responsibility of actors. Therefore, in relation to downward accountability it creates a power dynamic in development aid. NGDOs (non-governmental development organizations) focus on downward accountability to ensure the intended beneficiaries are being allowed their rights.

== Practice ==
Since the mid-1990s there has been a trend for NGOs and development donor agencies to combine the idea of development and human rights into the human rights-based approach to development. Although there has been an undertone of development within the association with human rights earlier than this time; it has been since the end of the 20th century when there were known links of combining development and human rights into the same efforts. This practice includes NGOs that are geared towards development as well as human rights. The donor agencies are now helping to fund this combination of human rights with development to become as effective as possible. Even human rights-based approach to development theories were involved with the Millennium Development Goals (MDGs). MDGs are the goals set forth by the UN member states to work for the alleviation of extreme poverty, fighting of disease, and other global problems.

There have been three growing trends in relation to NGOs and the rights-based approach to development that have been implemented into practice. The first trend is focusing attention onto a rights-based approach to development. The second trend is the joint advocacy by development NGOs and human rights NGOs to work together towards a common goal. The third trend is to expand the attention to economic and social rights as well. The Human Rights ideal imparts the international benchmark that states can have related and common ideas. To have internationally understood human rights allows NGOs, governments, and corporations to be held accountable for their actions. This change in focus on human rights-based approach to development challenges the market-dominated view that was popular during the 1980s into a view focused on the relationship between human rights and development.

These new trends have a significant impact and a possible paradigm shift. From looking at development as a gift turning to development as a human right puts the responsibility on the government. However, this is not just the home country, the responsibility of development resides in the hands of wealthy countries as well. To switch to a rights-based approach to development would then lead to using internationally agreed upon human rights as a responsibility of governments to provide. Within this theory development will no longer be viewed as a gift or a need, but rather a right that states and governments are held accountable for.

=== NGOs, UN agencies, donor agencies and specific programs ===
==== NGOs' involvement ====
NGOs that have implemented rights-based approach to development have done so with four main principles to follow. These principles are human rights-based approach design of their programs, education about rights-based approach, rights to participation, and accountability. Human rights-based approach design of their programs begins with analysis of the unfulfilled human rights. It then commits programs and funds to fulfill these missing human rights. The design of these programs also stresses that the donations are not a gift but rather that the people are finally receiving the human rights treatment they deserve. Education of human rights and the programs that are being implemented is important. The education is to inform the beneficiaries of their human rights as well as the ways in which NGOs and other organizations are attempting to increase their human rights. Education is also to inform the governments, international organizations and donor agencies that are dealing with human rights their roles and responsibilities. Then there is the principle of rights to participation. This deals with the idea that beneficiaries should be included when implementing programs on their behalf. Organizations should include the beneficiaries to help empower. Then there is the principle of accountability which is designed to have standards of human rights and development. It is also designed for NGOs, international organizations, donor agencies and governments to be held to a higher standard of responsibility.

Amnesty International and Human Rights Watch are two NGOs that have been involved traditionally with advocacy in relation to human rights. These NGOs have expanded from traditional political rights to expand to ESC rights, which includes economic and social rights as well.

Oxfam is an NGO that has adopted the rights-based approach to development. Oxfam vowed to continue to provide relief while also addressing the structural causes of poverty and injustice. This approach combines poverty, human rights, development and trade all within the same realm. Oxfam focuses a broad approach to the causes of poverty and injustice. This NGO also would like to put economic and social justice at the top of the world agenda.

The shift towards a rights-based approach to development forced Oxfam to reexamine its funding, a deeper examination into the state's role as a duty bearer, and using civil society as a vehicle for citizens to empowered to stand up for their rights. Oxfam also had to evaluate their development practices and business model.

There has been a shift from focusing upon civil human rights to human rights of social and economic areas. There are many NGOs that are now focusing upon the ESC (economic and social rights) while creating and implementing programs. Human Rights Watch is one of the NGOs that has implemented a focus on ESC rights. These rights focus on alleviating poverty and implementing equal social and economic rights in all levels of society.

NGOs that have implemented these ESC rights are focusing much of their attention on increasing the standard of living to be healthy and safe. This includes ideas of water rights in areas that lack clean drinking water and health rights that include availability of medicine and doctors. This would increase the impoverished peoples' standard of living by increasing basic living needs and access.

==== International development agencies involvement ====
Beginning in the late 1990s when a rights-based approach to development began to be a popular discourse, many aid donor agencies began to support this view towards development. Their intentions are to implement support for programs to incorporate both development and human rights in an interdisciplinary fashion.

Major donor agencies that have adopted the rights-based approach to development include UNICEF, UNDP (United Nations Development Program), UNFPA (United Nations Population Fund), ILO, Sida (Swedish International Development Cooperation Agency), Norad (Norwegian Agency for Development Cooperation), DFID (British Department for International Development), and the Australian aid agency. Other UN programs have also adopted the rights-based approach to development. This new development framework leads to moral legitimacy and social justice.

The United Nations Development Program began in the late 1990s to raise awareness about this new rights-based approach viewpoint to development. UNDP specifically focused upon the interactions of social and economic rights. Their focus was to help develop policy decisions related to social and economic rights in association with development. In 2000 UNDP published "Human Rights and Human Development", a document that provided their intentions and strategies based on their implementation of a rights-based approach to development. UNDP was also present at UN-sponsored conferences in relation to a rights-based approach to development that included the UN Millennium Summit. UNDP also provides tools for governments and donor agencies to support the rights-based approach to development.

UNICEF is another donor agency that has implemented the rights-based approach to development and its ideas. UNICEF has a more narrow focus on women's and children's rights. However, it has still implemented rights-based approach strategies with the programs UNICEF is helping to fund.

=== Application of rights-based approach in NGOs ===
NGOs transitioning to rights-based approach have to redefine missions, test new methodologies, reallocate funding, and train staff. To do this there are a few steps NGOs have to take in developing programs and campaigns around rights-based approach.

First, NGOs need to create program ideas. These are created based on an analysis of rights within a certain country. The analysis is necessary to identify and give priority to the most deprived in society. It is then the goal of a rights-based approach to empower those people. This step also identifies and reviews the capacity of the duty-bearers. It also tries to understand the relationship between the rights holders and the duty bearers.

The next step is to educate both the rights holders and the duty bearers by articulating the rights of citizens and duty of the government. This is an important step so both parties are knowledgeable about their individual rights, responsibilities, and roles in society. This enables effective communication necessary between rights holders and duty bearers.

After an extensive situation analysis, a project or program is developed. The program needs to address human rights deficits related to certain groups, communities, or countries facing abuses or discrimination. Baselines and benchmarks are set, which create transparency and accountability in the project. Goals are also created during this step in order to analyze the program's effectiveness in a human rights context at the end of the project. Finally, NGOs encourage control over the project by the affected peoples, utilizing the Right to Participate principle.

To determine the effectiveness of a project, it is essential all inputs, outputs, goals, and outcomes are assessed through a human rights lens. The results should then be organized in a logframe, to show the clear results of the project.

== Criticism ==
The new development theory of a rights-based approach has been met with positive feedback as well as criticism. There are thoughts that incorporating the language of human rights within development is simply a change of terminology and does not change the programs being implemented. The ability of a state to implement public policy has been hindered due to the need to comply with economic and social rights (ESC rights). Development practices that have not been combined with human rights have been more effective in implementing and monitoring programs; therefore, the combination of human rights with development is not necessary for beneficiaries.

While there still is a majority of positive feedback regarding rights-based approaches to development there are still criticisms surrounding the idea that changing terminology will not increase NGOs' productivity or even necessarily the effects of the NGOs' programs that are being implemented. Simply stating that governments and corporations should now be responsible for development as an issue of human rights does not mean that any changes in procedures will occur. In addition, many NGOs have combined the ideas of human rights and development long before the term "rights-based approach to development" was coined. The natural linkage between development and rights and alongside pressure on states and governments to be involved with issues of human rights as well as development. The pre-existing presence of these issues suggests that changing the terminology will not increase the effectiveness of the state.

Other criticisms concern the lack of a singular definition between scholars, organizations, and other users. Because the vague nature of a rights-based approach does not clearly represent a singular set of ideas, there is a multiplicity of explanations about rights-based approach that can pose problems when discussing how NGOs, donor agencies or UN programs will try to implement these ideas into their programs.

One example of an issue in implementation is within the realm of gender and development. Due to the long history of the movement for women's rights, there are many pre-existing efforts and organizations working to achieve equal rights in society. The introduction of a development dimension to this field can create a variety of issues including the dismissal of existing experts in gender equality, difficulties in program goal-setting and implementation, and introducing many of the other issues associated with economic development.
