= Ministry of Foreign and Diaspora Affairs (Kenya) =

Government ministry of Kenya

- Wizara ya Maswala ya Kigeni na Maswala ya Diaspora.
- Coat of Arms of Kenya

Agency overview
- Formed: 12 December 1963; 62 years ago
- Preceding agency: Ministry of Foreign Affairs
- Jurisdiction: Government of the Republic of Kenya
- Headquarters: Old Treasury Building, Harambee Avenue; P.O Box 30551-00100 G.P.O; Nairobi, Kenya
- Annual budget: KES.18.2 billion (FY 2021/22)
- Minister responsible: Hon Musalia Mudavadi
- Agency executives: Dr. A. Korir Sing'Oei, Principal Secretary (State Department for Foreign Affairs); Roseline K. Njogu, Principal Secretary (State Department for Diaspora Affairs)
- Website: mfa.go.ke

The Ministry of Foreign and Diaspora Affairs of the Republic of Kenya is a ministry in the Government of Kenya which oversees the foreign relations of Kenya. It is currently headed by Prime Cabinet Secretary Honourable Musalia Mudavadi who is the Cabinet Secretary. Other top leaders are Dr. A. Korir Sing'Oei, the Principal Secretary in the State Department for Foreign Affairs, and Roseline K. Njogu, the Principal Secretary in the State Department for Diaspora Affairs.

The Ministry was established in 1963 after Kenya's independence. Since independence, Kenyan foreign policy has been designed and guided by the principles of peaceful co-existence, preservation of national security, peaceful settlement of disputes, non-interference in the internal affairs of other states, non-alignment, national interest and adherence to the Charters of the United Nations and African Union.

A Service Charter, based on the current Strategic Plan and the Foreign Policy document, has been developed to guide the operations of the Foreign Ministry so that the Ministry can successfully implement its core mandate and functions. The Strategic Plan sets out what the Ministry is and what it does. The Ministry has developed a self-assessment mechanism, the Performance Contact, to facilitate delivery of services within predetermined targets.

== See also ==
- List of Foreign Ministers of Kenya
