= Human rights and development =

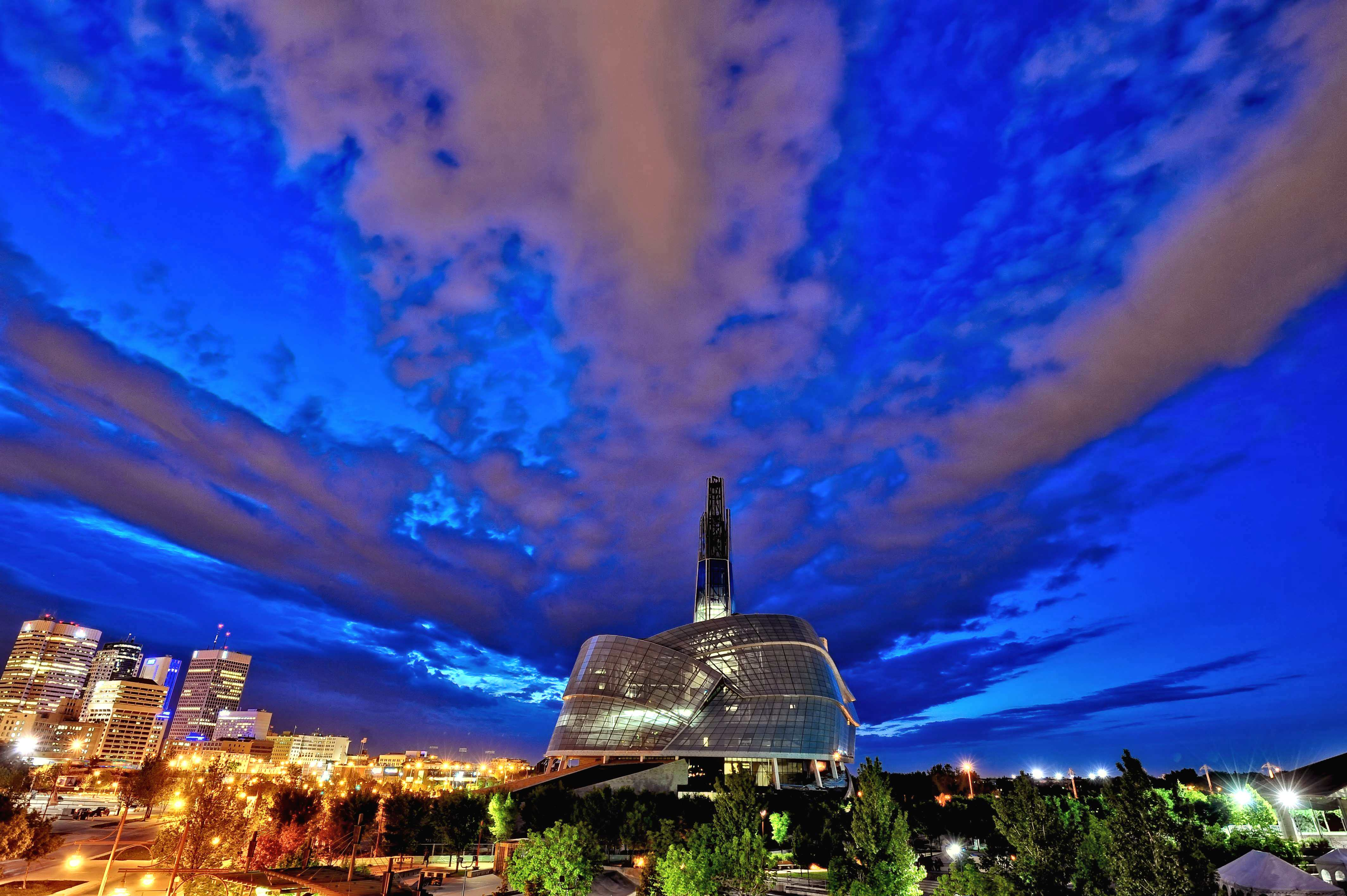
The Museum For Human Rights

Development is a human right that belongs to everyone, individually and collectively. Everyone is “entitled to participate in, contribute to, and enjoy economic, social, cultural and political development, in which all human rights and fundamental freedoms can be fully realized,” states the groundbreaking UN Declaration on the Right to Development, proclaimed in 1986.

Human rights add value to the agenda for development by drawing attention to the accountability to respect, protect, promote and fulfil all human rights of all people. It, in turn, contributes to the human rights-based approach to development. A human rights based approach will further generally lead to better analyzed and more focused strategic interventions by providing the normative foundation for tackling fundamental development issues.

== History ==
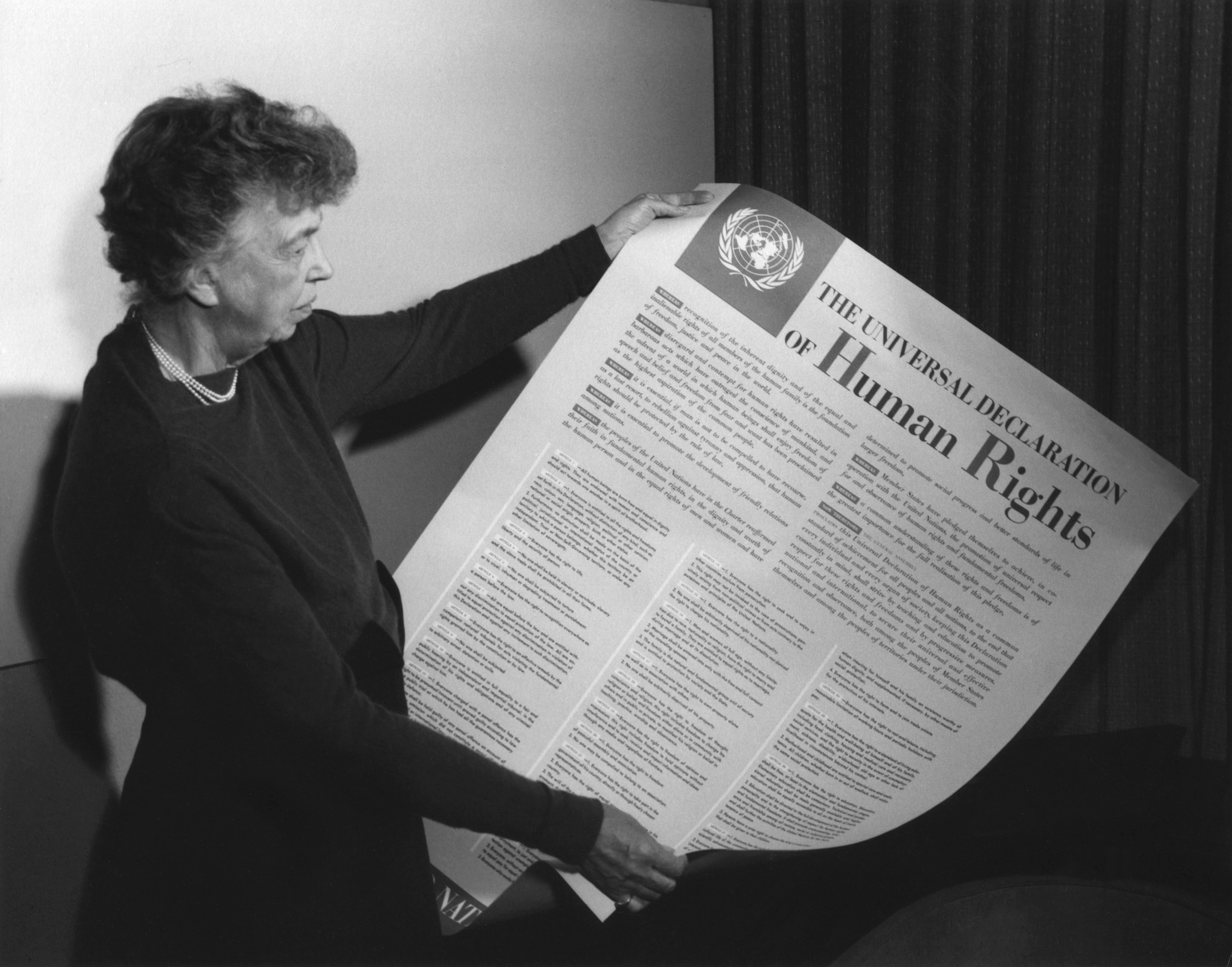
Eleanor Roosevelt with the Universal Declaration of Human Rights in 1949.

The initial impetus of the current human rights legal regime and movement was in reaction to the Nazi atrocities of World War II. Human rights are importantly referred to in the United Nations Charter in both the Preamble and under Article 1 though only sparingly. The preamble of the UN Charter reaffirms "faith in fundamental human rights, in the dignity and worth of the human person, in the equal rights of men and women".

The Charter established the Economic and Social council which set up the UN Human Rights Commission now the United Nations Human Rights Council. Chapter VI of the Charter entitled International Economic and Social Cooperation provides Article 55 (c) the "universal respect for, and observance of human rights and fundamental freedoms for all without distinction as to race, sex, language or religion". Article 56 requires States to take joint and separate actions in cooperation with the UN to achieve their mutual aims. Human rights are inherent in the progress of economic social and cultural goals and therefore to Human Development as such.

The Universal Declaration of Human Rights (UDHR) is a milestone document in the history of human rights. Drafted by representatives with different legal and cultural backgrounds from all regions of the world, the UDHRwas proclaimed by the United Nations General Assembly in Paris on 10 December 1948 by General Assembly resolution 217 A (III) as a common standard of achievements for all peoples and all nations. It sets out, for the first time, fundamental human rights to be universally protected. Since its adoption in 1948, the UDHR has been translated into more than 500 languages, is the most translated document in the world, and has inspired the constitutions of many newly independent states and many new democracies. The UDHR, together with the International Covenant on Civil and Political Rights and its two Optional Protocols (on the complaints procedure and on the death penalty) and the International Covenant on Economic, Social and Cultural Rights and its Optional Protocol, form the so-called International Bill of Human Rights.

== The Declaration on the Right to Development ==
The Declaration on the Right to Development was proclaimed by the UNGA under resolution 41/128 in 1986. with only the United States voting against the resolution and eight absentions.

The Right to development is regarded as an inalienable human right which all peoples are entitled to participate in, contribute to, and enjoy economic, social, cultural and political development. The right includes 1) people-centred development, identifying "the human person" as the central subject, participant and beneficiary of development; 2) a human rights-based approach specifically requiring that development is to be carried out in a manner "in which all human rights and fundamental freedoms can be fully realized"; 3) participation, calling for the "active, free and meaningful participation" of people in development; 4) equity, underlining the need for "the fair distribution of the benefits" of development; 5) non-discrimination, permitting "no distinction as to race, sex, language or religion"; and 6) self-determination, the declaration integrates self-determination, including full sovereignty over natural resources, as a constituent element of the right to development.

The right is a third generation right viewed as a group right such that it is owed to communities as opposed to an individual right applying to individuals "It is a people, not an individual, that is entitled to the right to self-determination and to national and global development" One obstacle to the right is in the difficult process of defining 'people' for the purposes of self- determination. Additionally, most developing states voice concerns about the negative impacts of aspects of international trade, unequal access to technology and crushing debt burden and hope to create binding obligations to facilitate development as a way of improving governance and the rule of law. The right to development embodies three additional attributes which clarify its meaning and specify how it may reduce poverty 1) The first is a holistic approach which integrates human rights into the process 2) an enabling environment offers fairer terms in the economic relations for developing countries and 3) the concept of social justice and equity involves the participation of the people of countries involved and a fair distribution of developmental benefits with special attention given to marginalised and vulnerable members of the population.

=== Duty bearers ===
Article 3 of the Declaration on the Right to Development provides that "States have the primary responsibility for the creation of national and international conditions favourable to the realization of the right to development".

Article 6 importantly provides "States should take steps to eliminate obstacles to development resulting from failure to observe civil and political rights, as well as economic social and cultural rights", echoing Article 2.1 of the International Covenant on Economic, Social and Cultural Rights (ICESCR) which states that "each State Party to the present Covenant undertakes to take steps, individually and through international assistance and co-operation, especially economic and technical, to the maximum of its available resources. Furthermore, the Maastricht Guidelines on violations of economic, social and cultural rights provides that a state is in violation of the Covenant if it fails to utilize the maximum of available resources towards the full realization of the Covenant.

=== UN mechanisms ===
The Intergovernmental Working Group on the Right to Development was established in 1998. Its mandate is to globally (a) monitor and review progress made at the national and international levels in the promotion and implementation of the right to development as elaborated in the Declaration on the Right to Development; (b) provide recommendations and analyse obstacles to the full enjoyment of the right to development, focusing each year on specific commitments in the Declaration; and (c) review reports and any other information submitted by States, United Nations agencies, other relevant international organisations and non-governmental organisations on the relationship between their activities and the right to development.

Led by the Chair-Rapporteur, the Working Group presents to the General Assembly and the Human Rights Council with a sessional annual report on its deliberations, including advice to the Office of the United Nations High Commissioner for Human Rights (OHCHR) with regard to the implementation of the right to development, and suggesting possible programmes of technical assistance at the request of interested countries with the aim of promoting the implementation of the right to development.

The mandate of the High Commissioner (HC) and the OHCHR as stated in resolution 48/141 4 (c) seeks "to promote and protect the realization of the right to development and to enhance support from relevant bodies of the UN system for this purpose." The right to development is highlighted in the General Assembly and the HRC which both request the UN Secretary-General and the HC to report annually on progress in the implementation of the right to development including activities aimed at strengthening the global partnership for development between Member States, development agencies and international development, financial and trade institutions.

== Human rights and the 2030 Agenda for Sustainable Development ==
=== Sustainable Development Goals ===
SDG 1: “End poverty in all its forms everywhere”

SGD 2: “End hunger, achieve food security and improved nutrition, and promote sustainable agriculture”

SDG 3: “Ensure healthy lives and promote well-being for all at all ages”

SDG 4: "Ensure inclusive and equitable quality education and promote lifelong learning opportunities for all"

SDG 5: "Achieve gender equality and empower all women and girls"

SDG 6: "Ensure availability and sustainable management of water and sanitation for all"

SDG 7: "Ensure access to affordable, reliable, sustainable and modern energy for all"

SDG 8: "Promote sustained, inclusive and sustainable economic growth, full and productive employment and decent work for all"

SDG 9: "Build resilient infrastructure, promote inclusive and sustainable industrialization, and foster innovation"

SDG 10: "Reduce income inequality within and among countries"

SGD 11: "Make cities and human settlements inclusive, safe, resilient, and sustainable"

SDG 12: "Ensure sustainable consumption and production patterns"

SDG 13: "Take urgent action to combat climate change and its impacts by regulating emissions and promoting developments in renewable energy"

SDG 14: "Conserve and sustainably use the oceans, seas and marine resources for sustainable development"

SDG 15: "Protect, restore and promote sustainable use of terrestrial ecosystems, sustainably manage forests, combat desertification, and halt and reverse land degradation and halt biodiversity loss"

SDG 16: "Promote peaceful and inclusive societies for sustainable development, provide access to justice for all and build effective, accountable and inclusive institutions at all levels"

SDG 17: "Strengthen the means of implementation and revitalize the global partnership for sustainable development"

=== Human rights and business ===
States have the primary role in preventing and addressing corporate related human rights abuses under resolution 8/7 governments can support and strengthen market pressures on companies to respect rights whilst adequate reporting enables stakeholders to examine rights related performance. To fulfil the duty to protect states must regulate and adjudicate the acts of business enterprises. International Human rights treaties do not themselves create direct obligations for corporations but treaty bodies refer more directly to the role of states in specifically guarding against human rights violations by corporations. The more recent Convention on the Rights of Persons with Disabilities clearly provides that state parties have an obligation to take all appropriate measures to eliminate discrimination on the basis of disability by any person organization or private enterprise.

Business enterprises should respect human rights, avoiding infringing on the human rights of others and they should address adverse human rights impacts when they are involved. The responsibility of business enterprises to respect human rights refers to those rights as expressed in the International Bill of Human Rights and the principles concerning fundamental rights set out in the International Labour Organization Declaration on Fundamental Principles and Rights at Work. As part of their duty to protect against business related human rights abuse States must take appropriate steps to ensure that those affected have access to effective remedy through judicial, administrative, legislative or other appropriate means.

Since the 1990s soft law instruments have been relied upon to guide corporate behaviour such as the OECD Guidelines for Multinational Enterprises, the UN Global Compact and the UN draft norms on transnational corporation and other business enterprises. The OECD Guidelines cover a wide range of issues including labour and environmental standards, human rights, corruption, consumer protection, technology amongst others. The guidelines are completely voluntary and were revised in 2000 and updated in 2011. In 2000 a complaint procedure was introduced allowing NGO's and others to submit complaints to alleged breaches where previously only trade unions could submit complaints. The 2011 update introduced a specific chapter on human rights and aligns the guidelines with the UN Special Rapporteur framework of "protect respect and remedy".

In 2000 the UN established the Global Compact which call on business leaders "embrace and enact' a set of 10 principles relating to human rights, labour rights, environmental protections and corruption. The compact did not include a mechanism for dispute resolution. In response to this criticism integrity measures were introduced in 2005 which created a complaints procedure for systematic abuse of the compacts overall aims and principles.

There has also emerged over the past decades a proliferation of company specific and multi-stakeholder codes of conduct such as the Sullivan principles and as such hundreds of companies have now publicly committed to upholding basic human rights. Codes of conduct are regarded as part of the soft law regime and are not legally binding but the general normative effect may lead to legal effect as standards may be incorporated into employment and agency contracts.

== See also ==
- ASEAN Human Rights Declaration
- Asian Forum for Human Rights and Development
- Asian Human Rights Development Organization
- Cambodian Human Rights and Development Association (ADHOC)
- Human development (humanity)
- Institute for Human Rights and Development in Africa (IHRDA)
- International Centre for Human Rights and Democratic Development
- International human rights instruments
- Office of the United Nations High Commissioner for Human Rights
  - Office of the United Nations High Commissioner for Human Rights § Research and Right to Development Branch
- Rights-based approach to development

== Bibliography ==
- Alston et all, Phillip (2005). Human Rights and Development Towards Mutual Reinforcement. Oxford: Oxford University Press
- Ishay, Micheline. "What are Human Rights. Six Controversies". Journal of Human Rights 3 (3)
- McBeth et all, Adam (2011). The International Law of Human Rights. Oxford: Oxford University Press.
- Moeckli et all, Daniel (2010). International Human Rights Law. Oxford: Oxford University Press
- Robertson QC, Geoffrey (1999). Crimes Against Humanity. Oxford: Oxford University Press
- Pogge, Thomas (2008). World Poverty & Human Rights. Polity Press
