= Moses Lessonet =

Kenyan politician

Moses K. Lessonet (born 5 October 1968) is a Kenyan politician. He was elected to represent the Eldama Ravine Constituency in the National Assembly of Kenya in the 2007 Kenyan parliamentary election as a member of the Orange Democratic Movement.He is an accountant by profession, having graduated at the University of Nairobi 1993 with Bachelor of Commerce (Accounting). In 2013, he ran for Parliament as a member of the United Republican Party.
