= Eldama Ravine Constituency =

Kenyan electoral constituency

Eldama Ravine Constituency box number 336-20103 is an electoral constituency in Baringo County, Kenya. It is one of six constituencies in the county and was one of two constituencies of the former Koibatek District. The constituency was established for the 1997 elections.

== Wards ==
Wards
Ward	Registered Voters	Local authority
Lembus	10,801	Eldama Ravine sub-county
Lembus Kwen	9,139	Eldama Ravine sub-county
Ravine	9,599	Eldama Ravine town Sub-County
Maji mazuri/Mumberes	9,412	Eldama Ravine Sub-County
Lembus Perkerra	9,246	Eldama Ravine Sub-County
Koibatek	6,545	Eldama Ravine Sub-County
Total	54,742	
*September 2017.

== Members of Parliament ==
Elections	MP	Party
1997	Musa Cherutich Sirma	KANU
2002	Musa Cherutich Sirma	KANU
2007	Moses Lessonet	ODM
2013	Moses Lessonet	URP
2017	Moses Lessonet	JP
2022	Musa Cherutich Sirma	UDA
