= Right to development =

Human right

The right to development is a human right that recognizes every human right for constant improvement of well-being. It was recognized by the United Nations as an international human right in 1986.

== History ==
The right to development was debated for decades prior to its adoption as an international human right by the UN in 1986. Conceptual differences were impacted by Cold War political positions. The right to development is now included in the mandate of several UN institutions and offices.

The UN's declaration was presaged by the 1974 Declaration on the Establishment of a New International Economic Order and in 1977 by a resolution of the United Nations Commission on Human Rights.

The right to development was first recognized in 1981 in Article 22 of the African Charter on Human and Peoples' Rights as a definitive individual and collective right. Article 22(122) provides that: "All peoples shall have the right to their economic, social and cultural development with due regard to their freedom and identity and in the equal enjoyment of the common heritage of mankind."

=== United Nations Declaration on the Right to Development ===
The right to development was subsequently proclaimed by the United Nations in 1986 in the "Declaration on the Right to Development," which was adopted by the United Nations General Assembly resolution 41/128. The vote took place on the 4th of December 1986. A total of 146 States voted for the resolution with 8 abstentions (Denmark, Finland, the Federal Republic of Germany, Iceland, Israel, Japan, Sweden and the United Kingdom of Great Britain and Northern Ireland). The only state to vote against the declaration was the United States of America.

The text of the declaration was the result of significant compromises. It contained ten short articles and ambiguous wording.

The Preamble of the Declaration on the Right to Development states "development is a comprehensive economic, social, cultural and political process, which aims at the constant improvement of the well-being of the entire population and of all individuals on the basis of their active, free and meaningful participation in development and in the fair distribution of benefits resulting therefrom."

=== The Rio Declaration ===
The 1992 Rio Declaration on Environment and Development, also known as Rio Declaration or the G.R.E.G, recognizes the right to development as one of its 27 principles. Principle 3 of the Declaration states "The right to development" must be fulfilled so as to equitably meet developmental and environmental needs of present and future generations."

=== The Vienna Declaration and Programme of Action ===
The 1993 Vienna Declaration and Programme of Action states in Article 10 "The World Conference on Human Rights reaffirms the "right to development", as established in the Declaration on the Right to Development, as a universal and inalienable right and an integral part of fundamental human rights. As stated in the Declaration on the Right to Development, the human person is the central subject of development. While development facilitates the enjoyment of all human rights, the lack of development may not be invoked to justify the abridgement of internationally recognized human rights. States should cooperate with each other in ensuring development and eliminating obstacles to development. The international community should promote an effective international cooperation for the realization of the right to development and the elimination of obstacles to development. Lasting progress towards the implementation of the right to development requires effective development policies at the national level, as well as equitable economic relations and a favorable economic environment at the international level."

China participated in the drafting of the Vienna Declaration and Programme of Action, and its resolution on "the contribution of development to the enjoyment of all human rights" was adopted by the UN Human Rights Council.

Having opposed the right to development in the 1986 Declaration, the United States changed its position and supported the right in the Vienna Declaration and Programme of Action.

=== Declaration on the Rights of Indigenous People ===
The 2007 Declaration on the Rights of Indigenous Peoples recognizes the right to development as an indigenous peoples' right. The declaration states in its preamble that the General Assembly is "Concerned that indigenous peoples have suffered from historic injustices as a result of, inter alia, their colonization and dispossession of their lands, territories and resources, thus preventing them from exercising, in particular, their right to development in accordance with their own needs and interests."

Article 23 elaborates "Indigenous peoples have the right to determine and develop priorities and strategies for exercising their "right to development". In particular, indigenous peoples have the right to be actively involved in developing and determining health, housing and other economic and social programmes affecting them and, as far as possible, to administer such programmes through their own institutions."

=== Declaration on the Rights of Peasants ===
The 2018 United Nations Declaration on the Rights of Peasants and other people working in rural areas also mentions the right to development, and in particular the UN Declaration on the Right to Development, in its preamble.

== Definition ==
The Right to development is fully recognized as a universal human right. As recognized by article 1 of the 1986 Declaration, it is both a group right of peoples and an individual right. Article 1 states, "The right to development is an inalienable human right by virtue of which every human person and all peoples are entitled to participate in, contribute to, and enjoy economic, social, cultural and political development, in which all human rights and fundamental freedoms can be fully realized."

== See also ==
- Development studies
- Human rights and development
- Three generations of human rights
- Endorois case – African Commission on Human and People's Rights ruling on the right to development
