= Koibatek District =

Sub-County in Baringo County

Coordinates: 0.05°N 35.7167°E

Koibatek Sub-County is a Sub-County in the Baringo County of Kenya. Its headquarters is Eldama Ravine. The Sub-County has an area of 2,306 km^{2} (890 sq mi) .

Local authorities (councils)
Authority	Type	Population*	Urban pop.*
Eldama Ravine	Town	36,480	10,518
Koibatek	County	101,683	11,930
Total	-	138,163	22,448
* 1999 census. Source:

Administrative divisions
Division	Population*	Urban population*	Population density*	Headquarters
Eldama Ravine	48,280	14,383	99	Eldama Ravine
Emining	14,066	403	35	Emening
Esageri	16,530	0	49	Esageri
Kimgorom	3,030	0	39	
Kisanana	6,698	0	28	Kisanana
Mogotio	17,930	3,579	33	Mogotio
Mumberes	20,451	3,018	189	
Sirwa	4,111	0	67	
Torongo	7,067	0	104	Torongo
Total	138,163	21,383	60 (average)	-
* 1999 census. Sources: , ,

The Sub-County has two electoral constituencies :

- Mogotio Constituency
- Eldama Ravine Constituency

== See also ==
- Bill Kipsang Rotich
