= Eldama Ravine =

Eldama Ravine E/Ravine
- Location within Kenya
- Coordinates: 0.05°N 35.72°E
- Country: Kenya
- County: Baringo County
- Time zone: UTC+3 (EAT)
- Climate: Cfb

Eldama Ravine (sometimes known by the short form E/Ravine) is a town in Baringo County, Kenya, a few miles north of the equator, geographical coordinates 0° 30' 0" North, 35° 43' 0" East. It was established as an administrative point by British colonialists and later served as a transit route for lumber harvested from surrounding forests.

It was previously the headquarters of the former Koibatek District and Eldama Ravine Constituency.

It has a population of 45,799 (2009 census). It is largely an agricultural trade point producing world popular commercial rose flowers. It is fairly cosmopolitan, having residents from more than half of Kenya's ethnic tribes.

== Naming ==
Eldama Ravine was first known as Shimoni due to the presence of a narrow ravine through which the Eldama Ravine River flows. Eldama, the non-English part of the name, is derived from the Maasai word ‘eldama’, which means the place of sunshine. It had two areas known as Lembus lowland or Soi (Mogotio constituency) and Lembus highland or Mosop (Eldama Ravine constituency).

The British East African Company (IBEACO) established the town in 1887 as a victualing center for caravans moving from the coast to Mumias. Later during the British colonial period, it served as the headquarters of the Baringo District and Naivasha province, then under the Uganda Protectorate.
