= Cemiride =

CEMIRIDE is an acronym for Centre for Minority Rights Development, a non-governmental organization in Kenya. CEMIRIDE is an advocacy group that works on behalf of minority and indigenous communities in Kenya and East Africa in hopes of protecting their human rights. The Centre promotes respect for the cultural minority and exposes human rights abuses in these countries as means to combat violence and promote peace.
