= Lake Suguta =

Former lake in East Africa

Coordinates: 2°00′N 36°30′E

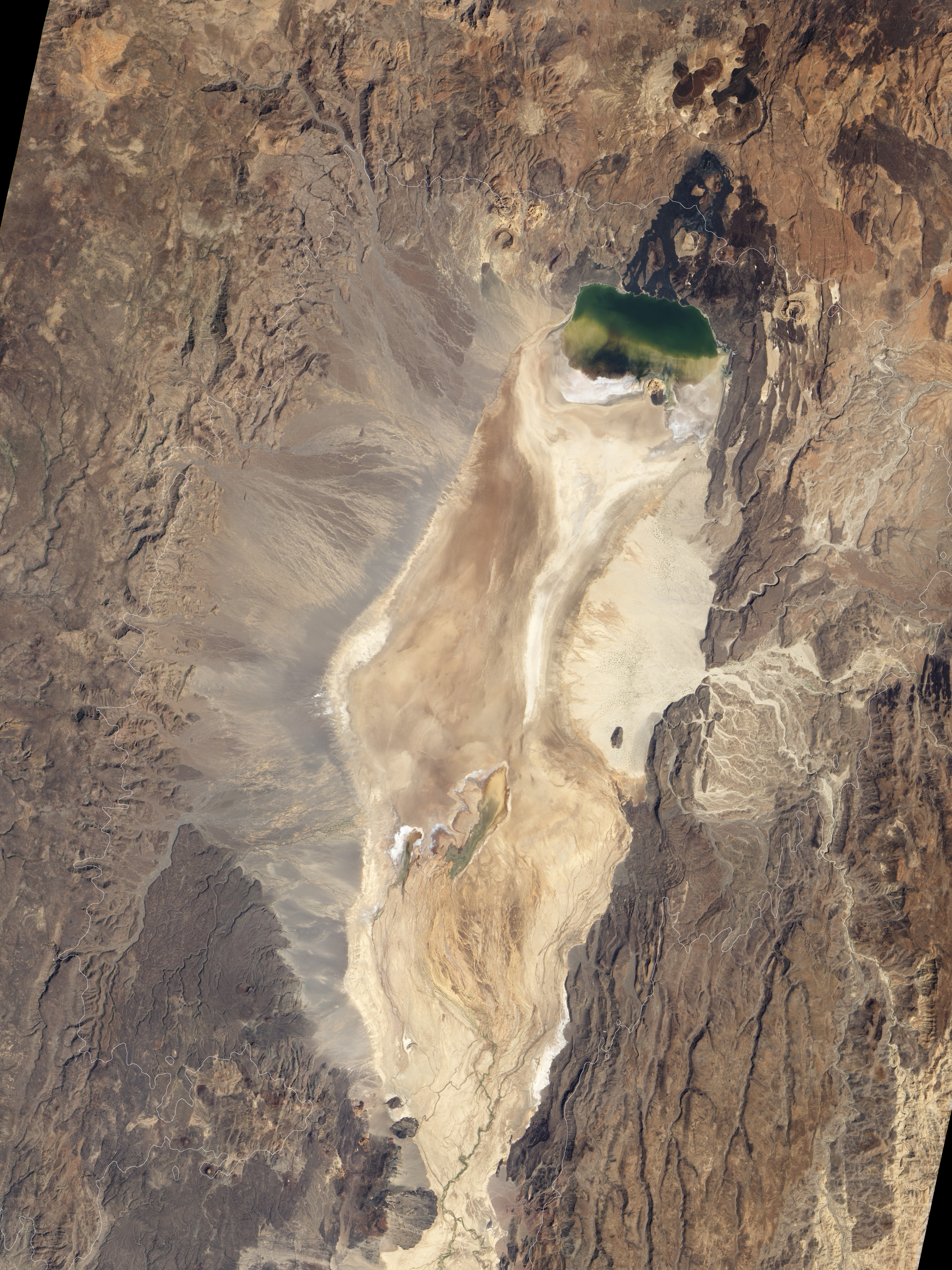
The basin of Lake Suguta viewed from space

Lake Suguta is a former lake in East Africa. It formed in the Suguta Valley, which is part of the East African Rift, south of Lake Turkana during the Holocene African humid period.

The lake existed a number of times during history, most recently during the early and middle Holocene when a stronger monsoon caused increased precipitation in the basin of the lake. The lake then reached a top elevation of 577 metres (1,893 ft) above sea level, when it overflowed into the Kerio River and then into Lake Turkana. The lake possibly ultimately drained into the Nile.

Between 8,000 and 5,000 years ago the lake progressively dried up; today only the small Lake Logipi occupies the area.

== Geography and geology ==
Lake Suguta lies in the Kenya Rift, which is part of the East African Rift. Starting with the Miocene, plate tectonics resulted in the pulling apart of the crust and the formation of the rift valley along with volcanoes; these include The Barrier volcano which starting from 1.3 million years ago and definitively from 0.2-0.1 million years ago separates Lake Suguta from Lake Turkana farther north. Volcanic activity in the region occurred as recently as 200 years ago.

The Suguta valley today is about 20 kilometres (12 mi) wide and 80 kilometres (50 mi) long, dropping down northwards to a lowermost elevation of 275 metres (902 ft) above sea level. It is relatively remote.

== The lake ==
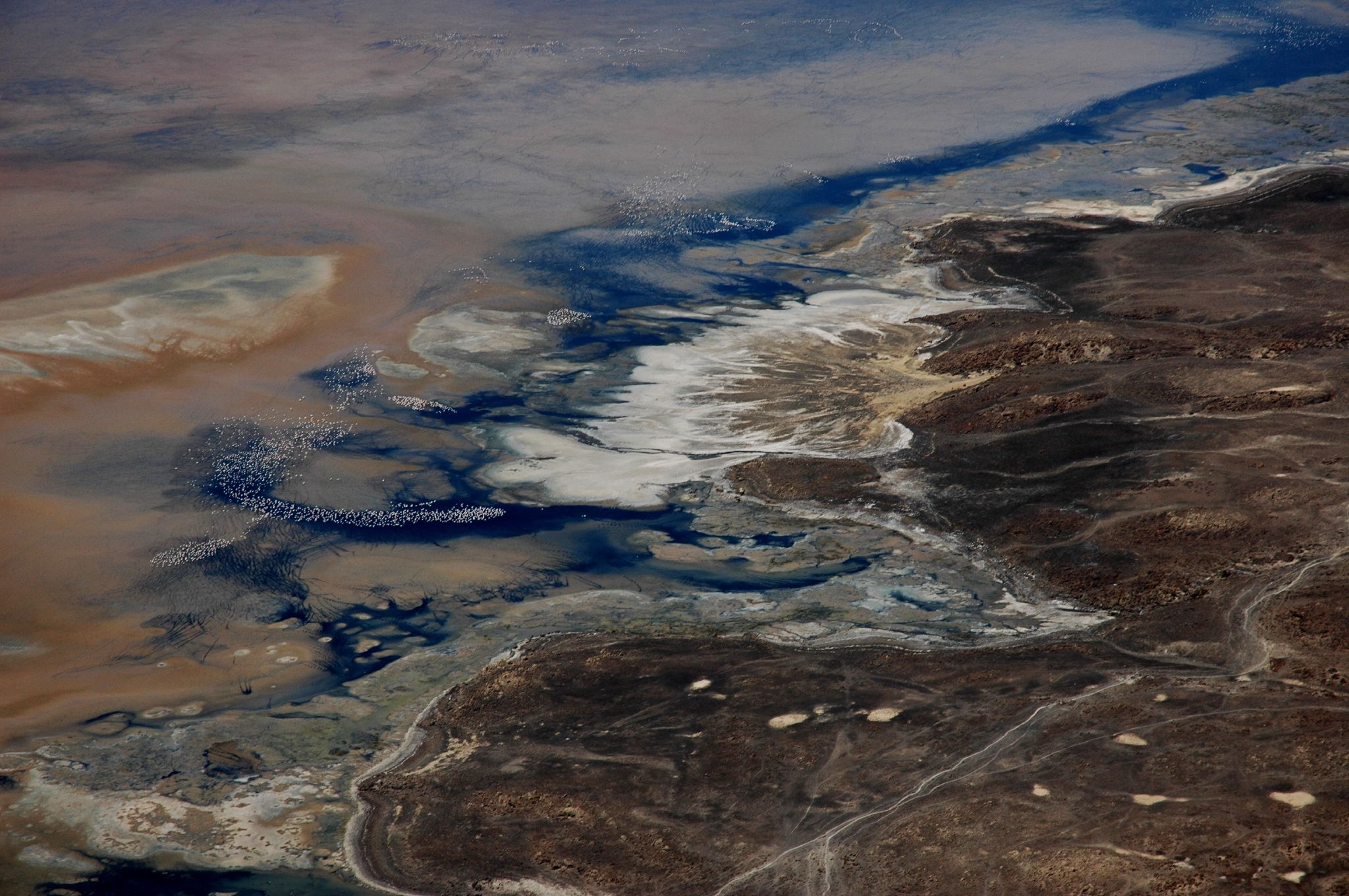
View of the lake

At highstand, Lake Suguta had a roughly rectangular shape with the long side trending north-northeast from Emuruangogolak volcano in the south to The Barrier in the north, and between the Loriu Plateau west and Tirr Tirr Plateau east of the valley. The lake covered a total area of 2,150 square kilometres (830 sq mi) and was about 300 metres (980 ft) deep. The Pliocene-Pleistocene Namarunu volcano formed a peninsula on the western coast, while the Kamuge River valley at the southwestern end of the lake was occupied by a bay. A cinder cone formed an island at the northern end of Lake Suguta and was reached by humans, judging by the presence of obsidian artifacts; traces of human activity have also been encountered

Wavecut terraces are found at the former shorelines of Lake Suguta, particularly at elevations of 577 metres (1,893 ft) which is where the main shoreline of Lake Suguta and also its highstand is located.

Volcanism occurred in the area of Lake Suguta when it existed, resulting in the formation of pillow lavas and phreatomagmatic activity, lava flows of Emuruangogolak volcano reached the lake on its southern margin 11,000 - 9,000 years before present, and a layer of tephra was deposited in parts of the lake 8,770 years before present. A number of cinder cones have been modified by Lake Suguta, and the increased availability of water allowed the onset of fumarolic activity at volcanoes today too dry to support fumaroles, such as on The Barrier where fumarole sinter was emplaced when Lake Suguta existed.

Some shorelines have been offset by faults, and the entire lake basin is tectonically tilted eastward, resulting in a corresponding vertical offset of shorelines. The existence of the lake itself affected regional tectonics; its disappearance and resulting unloading of the crust resulted in isostatic rebound in the area.

== Hydrology ==
The lake had two inflows, the Suguta River to the south and the Baragoi River to the southeast. The Baragoi River drains the Tirr Tirr Plateau, while the 175 kilometres (109 mi) long Suguta River drains an area of 13,000 square kilometres (5,000 sq mi) of the Kenya Rift valley almost all the way from Paka volcano close to the equator.

Lake Suguta at highstand had a volume of about 390 cubic kilometres (94 cu mi). Rivers transported sediments from the tectonically young terrain into the lake, forming deltas and resulting in high sedimentation rates close to the inlet of the Suguta River.

During the highstand period of Lake Suguta, local precipitation was over 26% higher than today. Most likely, the strengthening of the monsoon - especially the Indian monsoon - drew humid air from the Congo into the region of Lake Suguta, increasing precipitation.

== Overflow ==
A presently 581 metres (1,906 ft) high sill separates the headwaters of the Kerio River (which drains to Lake Turkana) from these of the Kamuge River. Lake Suguta overflowed through this sill into Lake Turkana. Overflow over this sill controlled the lake levels at highstand; that it is higher than the highstand shoreline is most likely a consequence of the tectonic tilting of the basin.

In addition, it is likely that during the highstand of Lake Suguta the Lake Baringo farther south overflowed into the Suguta River drainage basin, while Lake Turkana overflowed into the Nile. While this theory was at first viewed with scepticism, it is now likely that Lake Suguta was part of a large drainage system that formed a headwater for the White Nile along the Pibor River and Sobat River which connected Lake Turkana with the Nile.

== Climate ==
Climate in tropical Africa was dry during the Last Glacial Maximum. In the early Holocene, an increase in the strength of the monsoon caused a wet period in northern Africa, the African Humid Period, and the sizes of numerous lakes in East Africa were larger during the early Holocene 15,000 - 5,000 years ago than today. This strengthening of the monsoon also affected the Asian monsoon.

Increased insolation in the northern hemisphere is considered to be the cause of the African Humid Period; directed by the precessional maximum of insolation continents became much warmer than the ocean and thus the monsoon strengthened. Other mechanisms also played a role, seeing as the reconstructed changes in precipitation were considerably more abrupt than the actual changes in insolation. Further, humidity did not increase simultaneously in all places; locations farther north (such as the Omo River headwaters) reached maximum humidity (and thus maximum levels of the lakes fed by the rivers) later than locations farther south. This is because maximum humidity occurs when the maximum insolation coincides with the rainy season and this coincidence occurred later in history for the northerly water systems.

Nowadays the Suguta Valley is among the driest areas - if not the driest area - close to the equator, with precipitation estimated to be less than 300 millimetres per year (12 in/year) most of which falls during spring. Precipitation is highly variable from year to year. This climate is a consequence of the annual migration of the ITCZ; however the moist air from the Congo Basin does not reach Lake Suguta and that along with the dryness of the Asian monsoon in East Africa explains the precipitation patterns.

== Biology ==
Bivalves, freshwater snails, ostracods, oysters, prosobranch gastropods and stromatoliths occurred in Lake Suguta.

A Nilotic fauna has been found in fossils associated with Lake Suguta, which endorses the idea that the lake was formerly connected with Lake Turkana and the Nile. Conversely, the lake and the rivers associated with it might have formed a barrier to the movement of land animals.

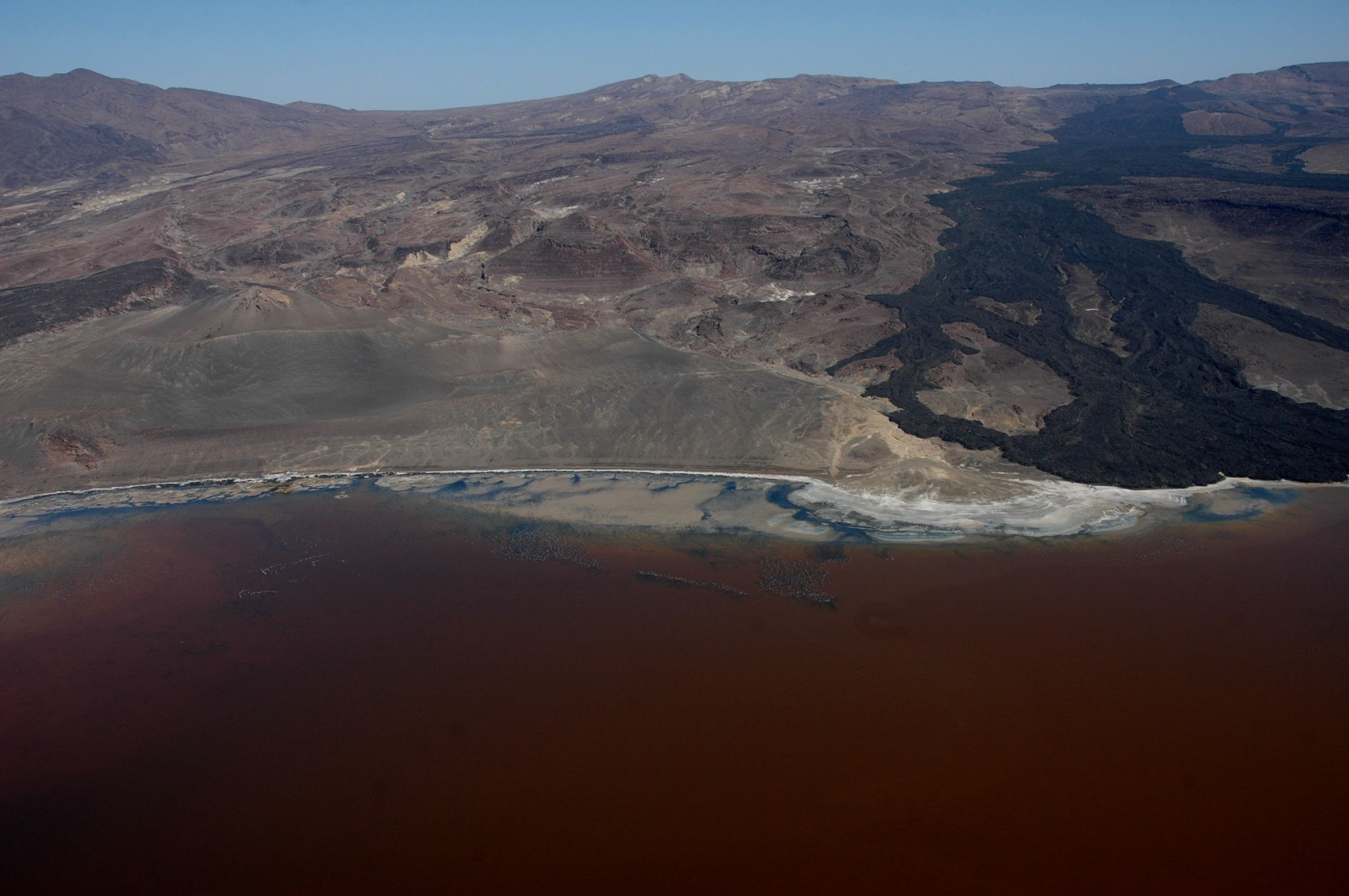
The present-day Lake Logipi

== History ==
The Suguta valley was occupied by a lake starting from 0.8-0.5 million years ago, but a lake existed here already 1–0.7 million years ago. Previously, the Suguta valley was connected to the Turkana basin that was eventually split by growth of The Barrier about 200,000 years ago. A first highstand occurred 121,000 ± 20,000 years ago. A shoreline at 437–460 metres (1,434–1,509 ft) elevation is dated to 30,000 - 27,000 years ago.

Between 16,500 and 14,000 calibrated radiocarbon years ago Lake Suguta had an elevation of 535 metres (1,755 ft). After an interval where the lake elevation is unknown, 12,800 calibrated radiocarbon years ago Lake Suguta reached its highstand. A brief drop in lake levels occurred 12,700 - 11,800 calibrated radiocarbon years ago during the Younger Dryas event; lake levels subsequently recovered. Such a lowstand at the time of the Younger Dryas has been observed in other African lakes.

The lake has left a number of shorelines all the way from the valley floor up to 577 metres (1,893 ft), where the highest and also most noticeable shoreline exists. This shoreline and several lower ones have left staircase-shaped wavecut terraces along the former shorelines of Lake Suguta. Lake levels were not stable, with several brief rapid lake level increases and lake level drops occurring between 10,700 and 8,800 years before present. Such lake level drops are associated with episodic weakening of the monsoons.

Beginning 8,500 calibrated radiocarbon years ago, lake levels started to decrease and reached a lowstand of 312 metres (1,024 ft) above sea level around 7,300 calibrated radiocarbon years ago. Lake levels after that point are uncertain but undoubtedly very low in comparison to the earlier Lake Suguta. In contrast, one date indicates that water levels were close to highstand around 6,700 years before present. Water levels around 8,250 - 5,000 years ago (when the African Humid Period ended) are unclear, but highstand ended latest around 5,200 years before present. The lake level drop between 8,700 and 8,200 years before present may be associated with the 8.2 kiloyear event, which is linked to drying elsewhere.

A last lake stand 12 metres (39 ft) above the lake floor occurred towards the end of the Medieval Warm Period. Presently, the site of Lake Suguta is occupied by a broad valley and Lake Logipi (also named Namakat or Lukula), which is fed by the Suguta River as well as ephemeral river and hot springs and whose surface varies from year to year. A second, ephemeral waterbody is found south of Logipi and merges with it during highstands: Lake Alablab. The area's arid climate is underscored by the scarce xerophytic vegetation and the occurrence of dunes. The valley flanks are more humid and feature deciduous woods.

When the existence of a former lake in the Suguta Valley was first considered, it was proposed that Lake Suguta was originally part of Lake Turkana and dried up when volcanic activity separated both lakes; later it was determined that Lake Suguta existed long after the Suguta valley's separation from the Turkana basin.
