= Suguta River =

Location
- Country: Kenya

Physical characteristics
- Mouth
  - coordinates: 1.972343°N 36.509628°E

The Suguta River is a seasonal river in the Great Rift Valley in Kenya (Africa), directly south of Lake Turkana. It flows northward through the Suguta Valley in the rainy season, forming the temporary Lake Alablad, a dry lake that combines with Lake Logipi at the northern end of the valley.

The Suguta River originates in a stream of near-boiling water that emerges from the side of Mount Silali, an extinct volcano. Some geologists speculate that the Kapedo hot spring, which drops through a set of waterfalls to the Suguta River, is the outlet from Lake Baringo 60 kilometres (37 mi) to the south. At one point the Suguta River passes between two volcanoes and is fed from both sides by hot springs.

In places the banks of the Suguta River are lined with palms. The river and its tributaries are home to a cichlid, the Suguta tilapia (Oreochromis niloticus sugutae). Although the river dries up after the rainy season, the fish survive in pools. The river is also home to numerous crocodiles. Large flocks of flamingos inhabit the edge of the river.

== See also ==
- Lake Suguta
