= Namarunu =

Shield volcano in Kenya

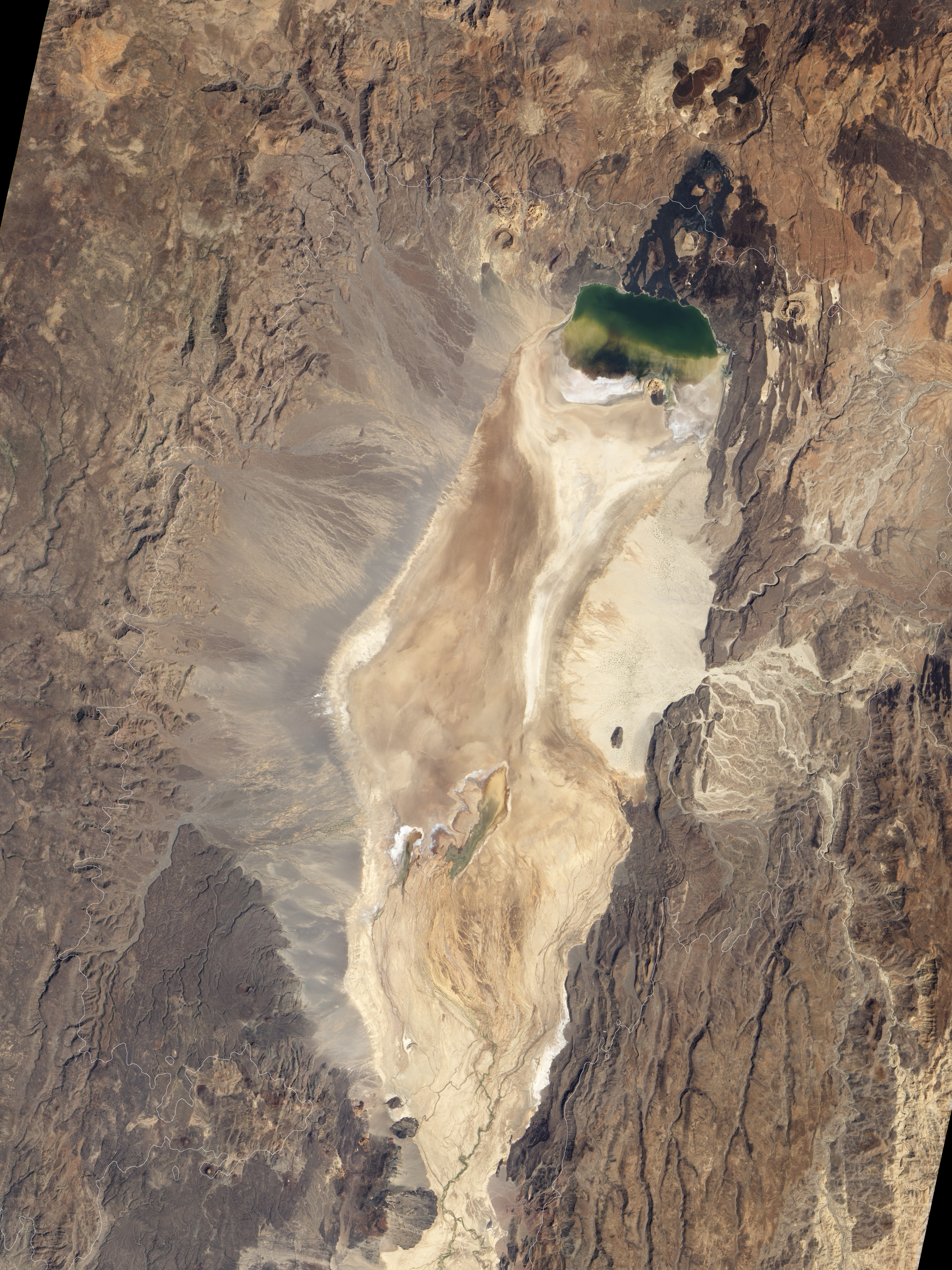
- Satellite view of the Suguta Valley. Namarunu in the bottom left.

Highest point
- Elevation: 817 m (2,680 ft)
- Coordinates: 1°59′N 36°26′E

Geography
- Location within Kenya
- Location: Kenya

Geology
- Formed by: Volcanism along the Gregory Rift
- Mountain type: Shield volcano
- Last eruption: 6550 BCE ± 1000 years

Namarunu is a shield volcano located in the Great Rift Valley, Kenya.

== Location ==
Namarunu is located in the Suguta Valley, a section of the Kenyan Rift Valley just south of Lake Turkana. It extends from the western side of the rift past the center. The mountain forms a broad shield. The large basal part is about 200 metres (660 ft) deep, made up of outward-dipping trachytic lavas, breccias and tuffs. A few thousand years ago the Suguta valley was filled by a major lake, but now it is extremely dry and hot, with only the small Lake Logipi at the northern end. Some of the recent cones on the floor of the rift valley and on the eastern side of the rift below the Tirr Tirr Plateau contain hot springs.

== Evolution ==
Namarunu was mainly formed during the upper Pliocene, but has some material from the Holocene. It is a trachytic shield volcano topped by more recent parasitic cones and lava flows. The basal trachyte dates to roughly 6.8 million years ago, while the uppermost basalts date to around 500,000 years ago. Large amounts of basalt were deposited in the Rift valley on the north, east and south of the volcano through effusion and explosions during the early Holocene. A breached scoria cone that forms the summit of the mountain also erupted fluid olivine basalts, with some eruptions later than the period around 3,000 years ago when Lake Suguta dried out. Eruptions may have occurred around the same time as historical eruptions of the Barrier Volcano to the north.

== See also ==
- List of volcanoes in Kenya

== Sources ==
- NASA Earth Observatory (November 20, 2011). "Suguta Valley, Kenya".
- Woolley, Alan Robert (2001). Alkaline rocks and carbonatites of the world, Part 3. Geological Society. ISBN 1-86239-083-5.
