= Olorgesailie =

Archaeological site in Kenya

Coordinates: 1.577878°S 36.446228°E

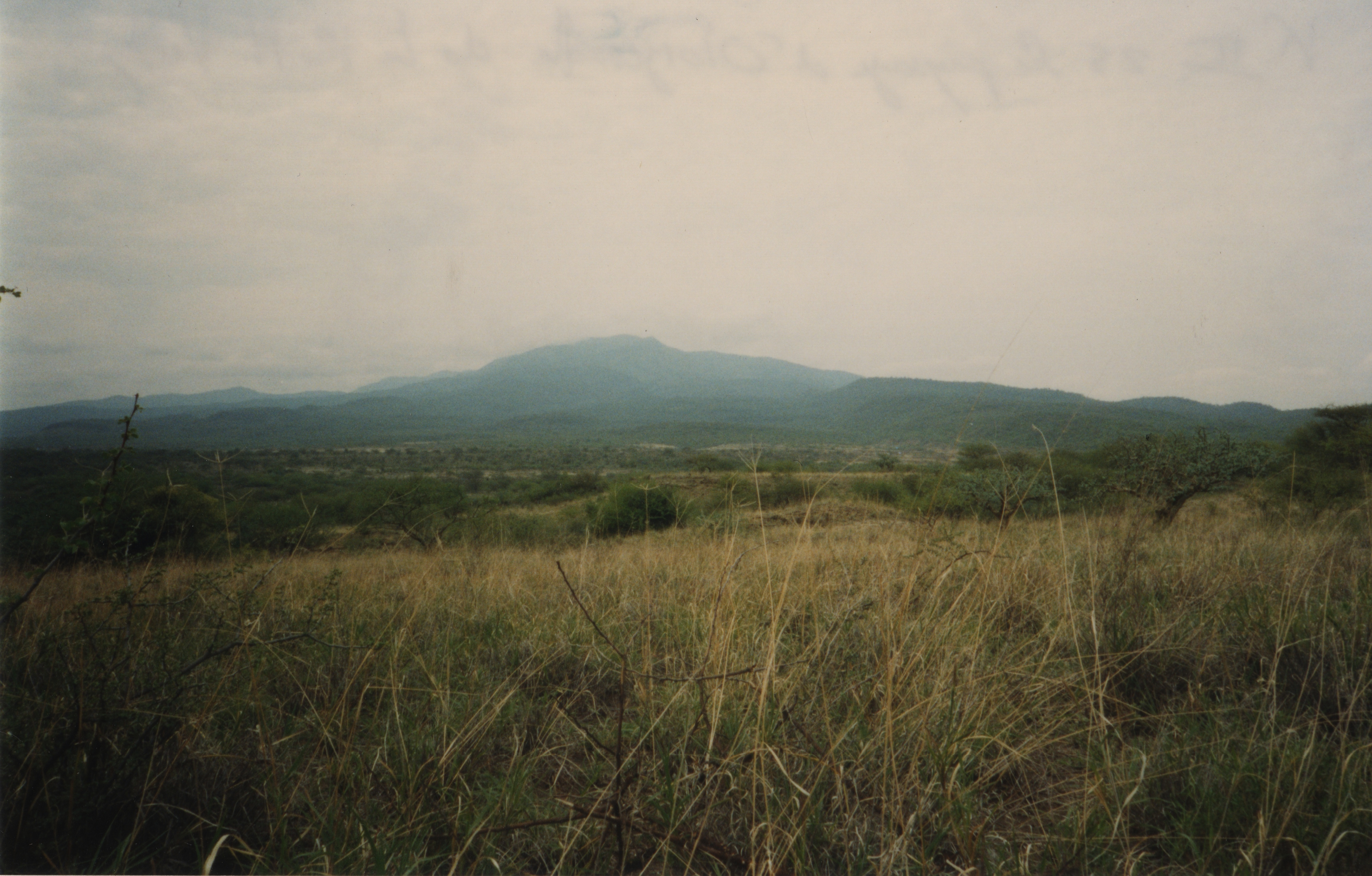
- Landscape near Olorgesailie
- Interactive map of Olorgesailie
- Periods: Lower Paleolithic
- Region: Eastern Rift Valley, Kenya

History
- Event: Acheulean hand axes

Olorgesailie is a geological formation in East Africa, on the floor of the Eastern Rift Valley in southern Kenya, 67 kilometres (42 mi) southwest of Nairobi along the road to Lake Magadi. It contains a group of Lower Paleolithic archaeological sites. Olorgesailie is noted for the large number of Acheulean hand axes discovered there that are associated with animal butchering. According to the National Museums of Kenya, the finds are internationally significant for archaeology, palaeontology, and geology.

== History ==
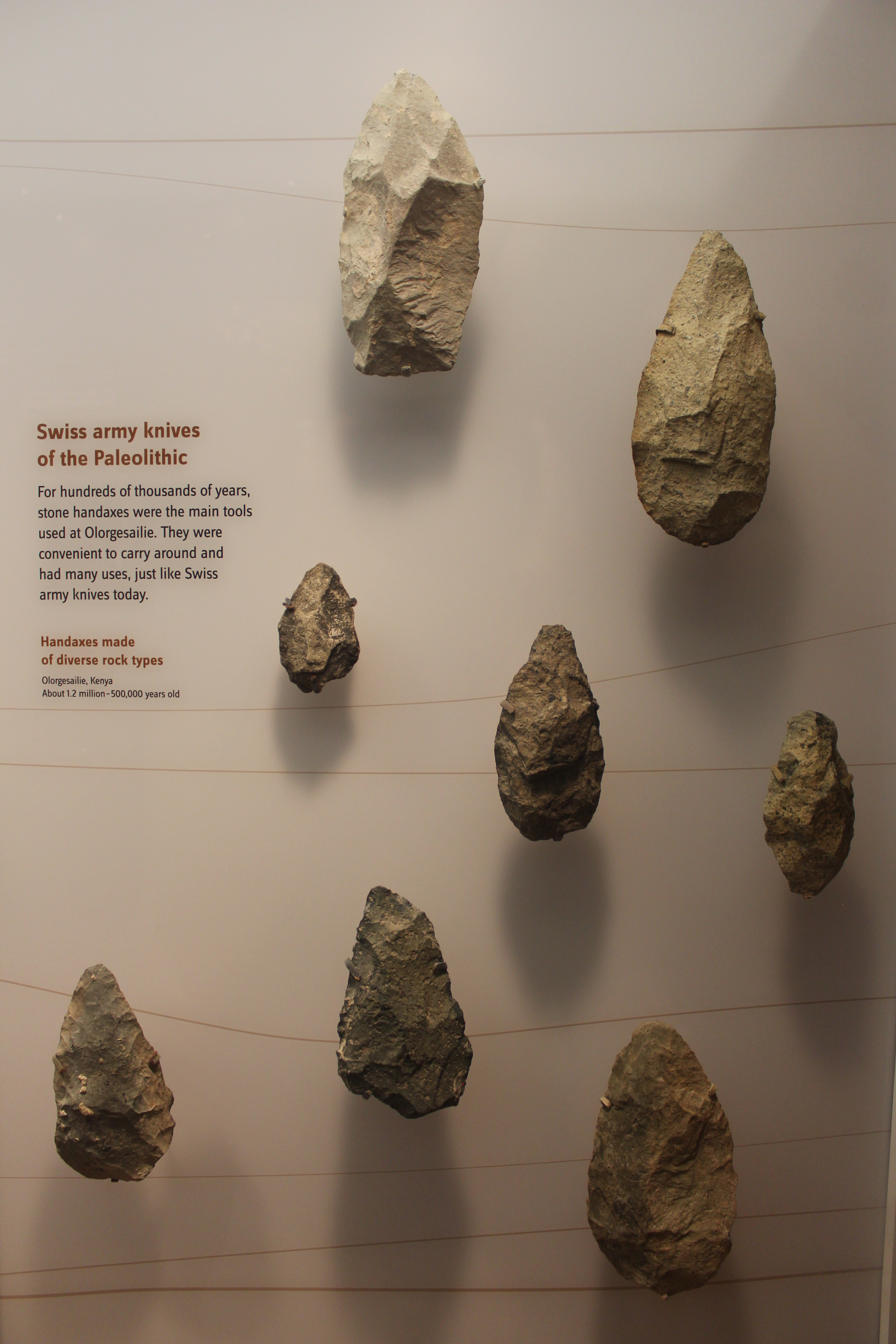
Hand axes

The artifacts were first discovered by the British geologist John Walter Gregory in 1919, but it was not until 1943 that excavation began in earnest under the direction of Mary and Louis Leakey, with the assistance of paroled Italian prisoners of war. Work continued there until 1947. Glynn Isaac took up the excavation in the 1960s for his dissertation. In the 1980s, research was continued by Richard Potts of the Smithsonian Institution in conjunction with the National Museums of Kenya.

== Finds ==
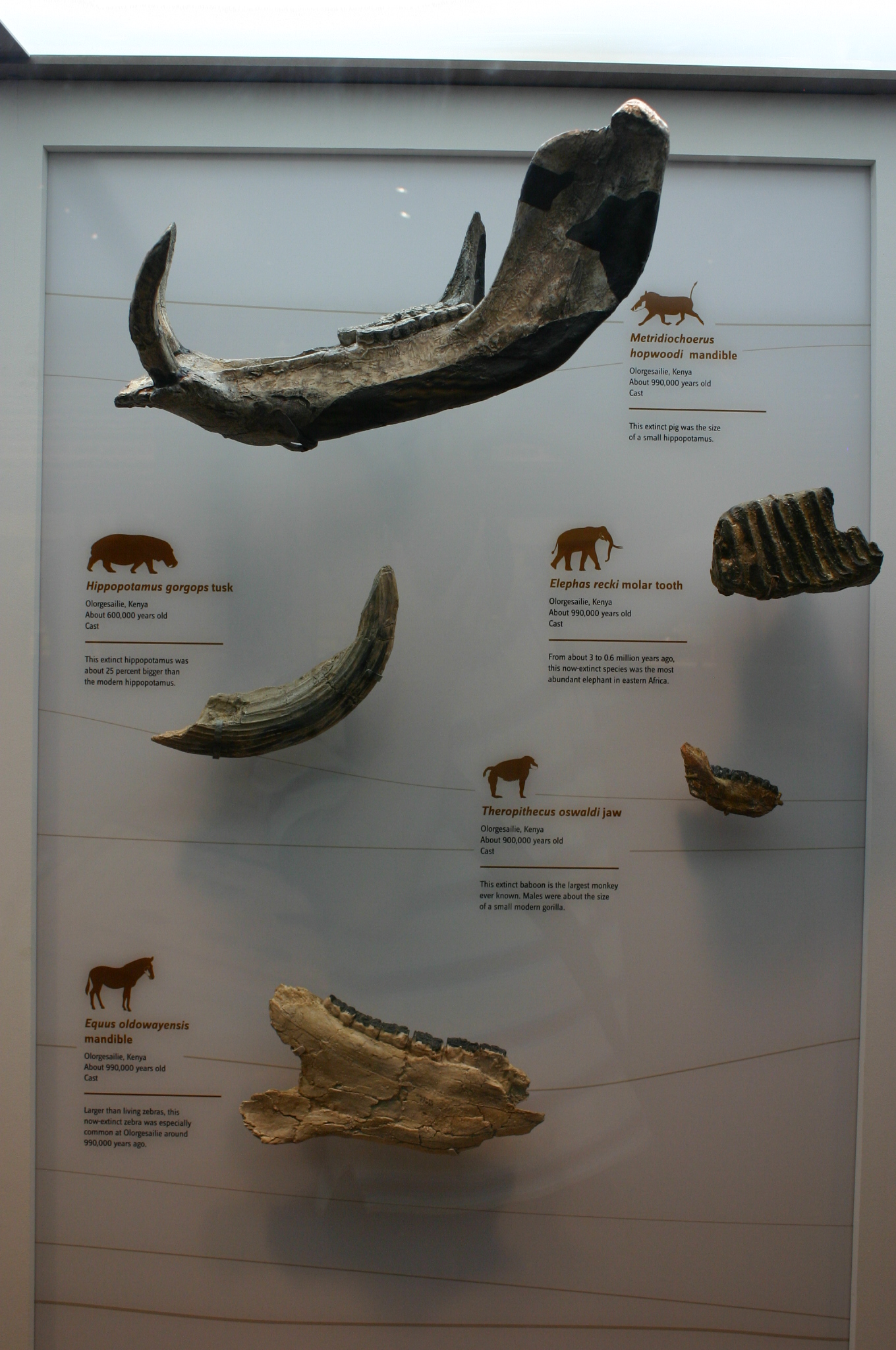
Animal fossils from Olorgesailie

Human tools are the most prominent of all historic items in the area. The abundant hand axes are characteristic of the Acheulean period, made by hominins between about 600,000 and 900,000 years agoalong what was then the shore of a now dried-up lake. Fossils of various animals have also been found, including those of extinct species of hippo, elephant, zebra, giraffe, and baboon, likely to have been butchered with the aid of the hand axes.

In June 2003, a team led by Potts discovered a frontal bone in situ. Other parts of the small skull (designated KNM-OL 45500) were found in following months. The frontal bone is 900,000 to 970,000 years old and probably belonged to Homo erectus, thereby making it the first human fossil found on the site. The fossil remains were in the same stratigraphic level as two hand axes and several flakes, near dense deposits of hand axes.

In 2018, evidence dating to about 320,000 years ago was found at Olorgesailie of the early emergence of complex and modern behaviors, possibly associated with early Homo sapiens, including: the trade and long-distance transportation of resources (such as obsidian), the use of pigments, and the possible making of projectile points. The emergence of these behaviors, it is observed by the authors of three 2018 studies on the site, approximately corresponds to the earliest known Homo sapiens fossil remains from Africa (such as at Jebel Irhoud, Morocco and Florisbad, South Africa) dated to about the same period, and it is suggested that complex behaviors began in Africa around the time of the emergence of Homo sapiens.

== Geology ==
Preservation of the Aechulean hand axe culture was made possible by heavy falls of alkaline ash from volcanoes near the site that were active at the time. Mount Suswa and Mount Longonot are volcanoes, and their vents are likely to have contributed to the ash that accumulated in the Olorgesailie basin. Subsequent sedimentation covering the site has preserved the fossils and created a stratigraphy which helps in dating them. Existing temporary lakes and swamps give evidence of a humid climate during the middle Pleistocene. Sediments left by the lake cover an area of about 130 km^{2} (50 sq mi). Of the artefacts, 99% were made from locally derived lavas, particularly trachyte, although small amounts of quartzite and obsidian have been found, indicating transportation over 16 to 40 km.

== Olorgesailie drilling project ==
In the 21 October 2020 issue of the journal Science Advances, an interdisciplinary team of scientists led by Richard Potts, director of the Human Origins Program at the Smithsonian's National Museum of Natural History, described the prolonged period of instability across the landscape in this part of Africa (now Kenya) that occurred at the same time humans in the region were undergoing a major behavioral and cultural shift in their evolution. Erosion at Olorgesailie, a hilly area full of sedimentary outcrops, had removed the geologic layers representing some 180,000 years of time at exactly the period of this evolutionary transition. Due to this, his team had to drill for sediments. They arranged to have a Nairobi company drill in the nearby Koora basin, extracting sediment from as deep into the earth as they could. The drill site, about 24 kilometres (15 mi) from the archaeological dig sites, was a flat, grassy plain, and the team had no clear idea what was beneath its surface. With the involvement and support from the National Museums of Kenya and the local Oldonyo Nyokie community, a 139-meter core was removed from the earth. That cylinder of earth, just four centimeters in diameter, turned out to represent 1 million years of environmental history. Colleagues in the National Museum of Natural History's Human Origins Program and Department of Paleobiology and dozens of collaborators at institutions worldwide worked to analyze the environmental record they had obtained, which is now the most precisely dated African environmental record of the past 1 million years. They found that after a long period of stability, the environment in this part of Africa became more variable around 400,000 years ago, when tectonic activity fragmented the landscape. By integrating information from the drill core with knowledge gleaned from fossils and archeological artifacts, they determined that the entire ecosystem evolved in response.

== Bibliography ==
- Isaac, Glynn Llywelyn; Isaac, Barbara (1977). Olorgesailie: Archeological Studies of a Middle Pleistocene Lake Basin in Kenya. Chicago: University of Chicago Press. ISBN 978-0-226-38483-2.
