= Losiolo Escarpment =

Mountain in Kenya

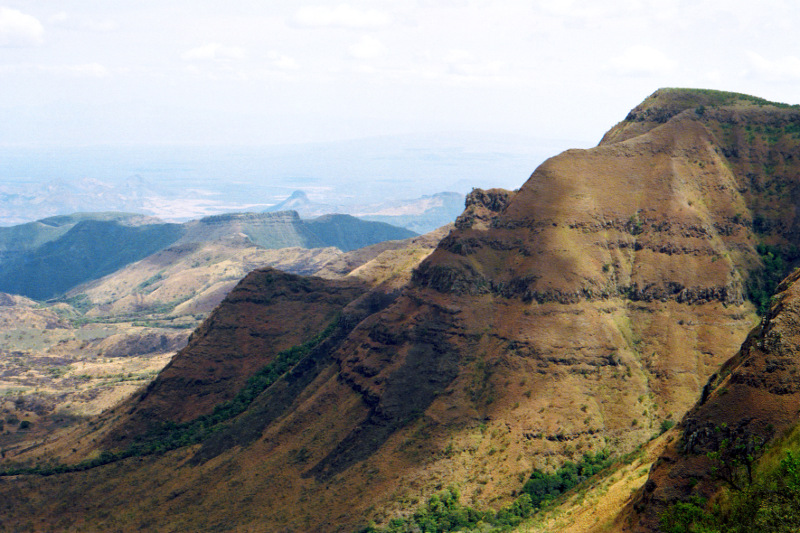

Highest point
- Coordinates: 1°12′33″N 36°31′17″E

Geography
- Location within Kenya
- Location: Kenya

The Losiolo Escarpment is an escarpment on the east side of the Great Rift Valley, Kenya. Rising 2,000 metres (6,600 ft) above the Suguta Valley floor on the east side near Maralal, the escarpment provides dramatic views of the Kenyan rift valley. The escarpment, which is also known as 'World's End', is the longest vertical drop in the Rift Valley.

== Sources ==
- "Maralal". Go2Africa.
- Trillo, Richard (2002). Rough guide to Kenya. Rough Guides. ISBN 1-85828-859-2.
