= List of volcanoes in Kenya =

This is a short list of active and extinct volcanoes in Kenya.

== List of volcanoes in Kenya (non-exhaustive) ==
Name	Elevation		Location	Last eruption
Name	meters high	feet	Coordinates	Last eruption
Barrier	1032	3385	2.32°N 36.57°E	1921
Central Island	550	1804	3.50°N 36.042°E	Holocene
Chyulu Hills	2188	7178	2.68°S 37.88°E	1855
Mount Elgon	4321	14178	1.1°N 34.5°E	-
Elmenteita Badlands	2126	6975	0.52°S 36.27°E	Holocene
Emuruangogolak	1328	4357	1.50°N 36.33°E	1910
Homa Mountain	1751	5745	0.38°S 34.50°E	Holocene
Mount Kenya	5199	17057	0°9′S 37°18′E	2.6 mya
Korosi	1446	4744	0.77°N 36.12°E	Holocene
Likaiu	915	3000	2.17°N 36.36°E	-
Longonot	2776	9108	0.914°S 36.446°E	1863
Marsabit	1707	5600	2.32°N 37.97°E	Holocene
Menengai	2278	7472	0.20°S 36.07°E	6050 BC
Namarunu	817	2680	1.90°N 36.27°E	6550 BC
North Island (Kenya)	520	1706	4.07°N 36.05°E	Holocene
Nyambeni Hills	750	2460	0.23°N 37.87°E	Holocene
Ol Doinyo Eburru	2856	9370	0.63°S 36.23°E	Holocene
Ol Kokwe	1130	3707	0.63°N 36.08°E	Holocene
Olkaria	2434	7985	0.904°S 36.292°E	1770
Paka	1697	5568	0.92°N 36.18°E	6050 BC
Segererua Plateau	699	2293	1.57°N 37.90°E	Holocene
Silali	1528	5013	1.15°N 36.23°E	5050 BC
South Island (Kenya)	800	2625	2.63°N 36.60°E	1888
Mount Suswa	2356	7730	1.175°S 36.35°E	Holocene
