= Mount Silali =

Dormant volcano in Kenya

Silali
- Location within Kenya

Highest point
- Elevation: 1,528 m (5,013 ft)
- Coordinates: 1°10′10″N 36°10′30″E

Geography
- Location: Kenya

Geology
- Formed by: Volcanism along the Gregory Rift
- Last eruption: 5050 BCE ± 1000 years

Mount Silali is a dormant volcano in the Gregory Rift Valley, near Kapedo, Kenya. Silali is south of the Suguta Valley, which reaches northward to Lake Turkana, and is about 70 kilometres (43 mi) north of Lake Baringo.

== Geology ==
Mount Silali is part of a group of volcanoes, the others being Paka and Korosi, in the Loyamoruk Plains of the eastern Nginyang Division of Baringo County. Silali is a recent volcano that became active from 400,000 to 220,000 years ago, and was still active 7,000 years ago. It is the largest caldera volcano in the Gregory Rift Valley. Its pre-caldera development began with mainly peralkaline trachyte lavas and pyroclasts, succeeded by mildly alkaline to transitional basalts. The basalts of the mountain are similar in composition to oceanic island basalts, but have a range of isotopes indicating a variety of origins.

The Kenya rift is oriented north-south, and in the past the minimum horizontal tectonic stress direction was east-west, the direction of extension. The alignment of rows of recently formed small vents, cones, domes and collapse pits in the Silali region indicates that the minimum horizontal stress direction has changed to NW-SE within the last half million years.

== Environment ==
Mean annual temperature in the Loyamoruk Plains is 26 °C (79 °F), rising to 40 °C (104 °F) in the hot season. Rainfall averages 594 millimetres (23.4 in), with wide variations. The thorn-bush savannah plain has no permanent source of water, with the Nginyang River flowing only after rains. There are some highland pastures on Mount Silali with perennial grasses. From oral accounts, the environment has become significantly drier in the last few decades, and with less grass and fewer types of grass.

== Energy potential ==
The mountain is potentially a source of geothermal energy. There are hot springs at Kapedo to the west with temperatures of 45 °C (113 °F) to 55 °C (131 °F). The eastern part has many fumaroles and hot and altered grounds with temperatures that range from 65 °C (149 °F) to 90 °C (194 °F). In September 2011 the Geothermal Development Company (GDC) of Kenya said that 19 companies had submitted bids to develop geothermal power plants at Lake Bogoria and at Silali. GDC intended to choose eight companies, each to build one 100 MW power plant. They expected the plants to start coming on line in 2017.

== Sources ==
- Bollig, Michael (2006). Risk management in a hazardous environment: a comparative study of two pastoral societies. Birkhäuser. ISBN 0-387-27581-9.
- Bosworth, W.; Burke, K.; Strecker, M. (2000). M.W. Jessell and J.L.Urai (ed.). "Magma chamber elongation as an indicator of intraplate stress field orientation: "borehole break-out mechanism" and examples from the Late Pleistocene to Recent Kenya Rift Valley. In: Stress, Strain and Structure, A volume in honour of W D. Means". Journal of the Virtual Explorer. 2. doi:10.3809/jvirtex.2000.00008. Archived from the original on 2012-03-28.
- McCall, Joe (1999). "Silali Volcano, Baringo, Kenya: sedimentary structures at the western fringe". Late cenozoic environments and hominid evolution: a tribute to the late Bill Bishop. Geological Society. ISBN 1-86239-036-3.
- MacDonald, R.; Davies, G. R.; Upton, B. G. J.; Dunkley, P. N.; Smith, M.; Leat, P. T. (1995). "Petrogenesis of Silali volcano, Gregory Rift, Kenya". Geological Society of London.
- Richter, L.X. (September 5, 2011). "19 COMPANIES BIDDING FOR 800 MW DEVELOPMENT AT BOGORIA-SILALI IN KENYA".
- "Silali, here we come". Geothermal Development Company. February 15, 2010.
- "Silali with Jan". Mountain Club of Kenya. August 12, 2011. Archived from the original on April 20, 2012.
