= Suguta Valley =

Arid part of the Great Rift Valley in Kenya

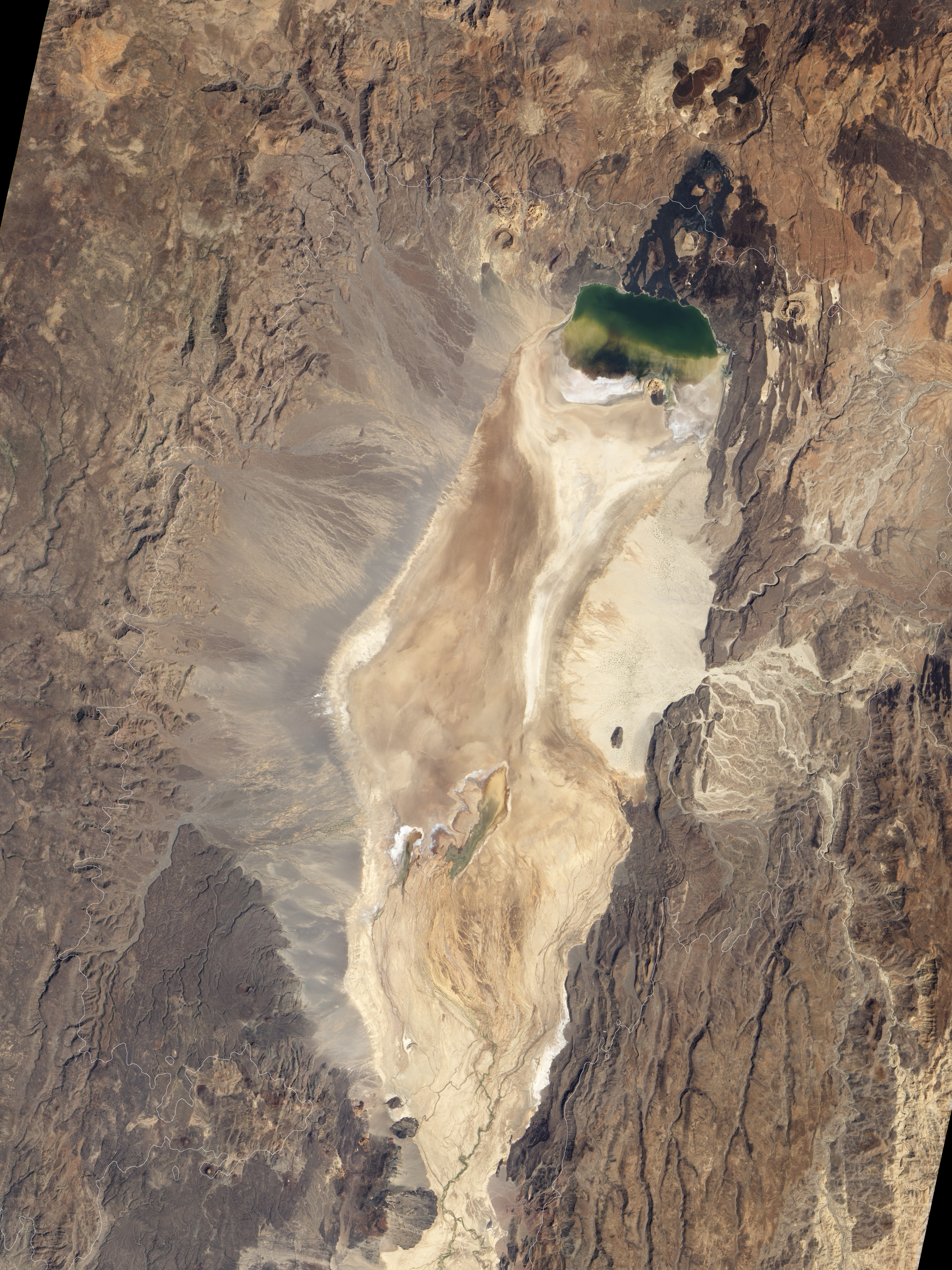
- Satellite view of the valley. Namarunu in lower left, Lake Logipi towards the upper right.

- Location within Kenya
- Floor elevation: 300 m (980 ft)

Geography
- Coordinates: 2°05′28″N 36°30′49″E
- Interactive map of Suguta Valley

The Suguta Valley, also known as the Suguta Mud Flats, is an arid part of the Great Rift Valley in Kenya (Africa), directly south of Lake Turkana.

== Location ==
The Suguta valley today is one of the driest parts of Kenya, with annual rainfall below 300 millimetres (12 in). Lake Logipi seasonally fills a small part of the northern end of the valley. The valley has a relatively flat floor about 300 metres (980 ft) above sea level. It is bordered by land to the east and west rising to 1,000 metres (3,300 ft) and dotted with volcanic cinder cones. The Barrier Volcano, a broad volcanic complex, separates the valley from Lake Turkana. Mount Ngiro rises to the east of the Suguta valley. The Losiolo Escarpment, rising 2,000 metres (6,600 ft) above the valley floor on the east side near Maralal provides one of the most dramatic views of the Kenyan rift valley. Namarunu, a volcano active in historic times, extends into the valley from the western wall.

The Suguta Valley lies along the axis of the Gregory Rift, which has been faulting in this area since the Pliocene along a belt 35 kilometres (22 mi) wide. The belt lies between the Ngiro basement uplift to the east and the Loriu Plateau to the west and is thicker in the eastern part. Exposed volcanic rocks include basalts, tuffs and ash formed between 4.2 and 3.8 million years ago, the products of trachytic volcanism from 3,8 to 2.6 million years ago and basaltic and alkali basaltic rocks created from that period until the present. In the early Pliocene the least horizontal stress direction - the direction of rift expansion - was NW-SE.

== Hydrology ==
Lake Suguta once filled the valley, at times overflowing into Lake Turkana. The lake level rose and fell several times in the last 18,000 years due to changes in rainfall during the African Humid Period that lasted from 14,800 to 5,500 years ago. The lake level began to drop about 8,000 years ago, falling by 250 metres (820 ft).

The valley is drained by a seasonal stream, the Suguta River, which in the rainy season forms the temporary Lake Alablad, a playa lake that combines with Lake Logipi at the northern end of the valley. In the dry season saline hot springs help maintain water levels in Lake Logipi, which is about 3 metres (9.8 ft) to 5 metres (16 ft) at its greatest depth, about 6 kilometres (3.7 mi) wide and 3 kilometres (1.9 mi) wide.

== Ecology ==
The saline waters provide food for cyano-bacteria and other plankton, which in turn are food for flamingoes. Due to the inaccessibility and harsh climate, with high temperatures, only the most determined tourists visit the site.

The valley is used as a hide-out by Pokot and Turkana cattle rustlers. It is considered a "no go" region by the police due to the extremely harsh environment and familiarity of the rustlers with the terrain.

== November 2012 Police Killings ==
In November 2012 over 40 Kenya Police officers and reservists were killed in the Suguta Valley near Baragoi while on a mission to recover stolen cattle.

== Sources ==
- Bosworth, W.; Maurin, Andre (August 1993). "Structure, geochronology and tectonic significance of the northern Suguta Valley (Gregory Rift), Kenya". Journal of the Geological Society. 150 (4): 751–762. Bibcode:1993JGSoc.150..751B. doi:10.1144/gsjgs.150.4.0751. S2CID 129109081.
- Kiarie, Joe (21 October 2011). "Kenyan mountain and valley are havens for bandits". The Standard.
- Mathea, Chege David (1 November 2009). "OUR LAKES, OUR FUTURE" (PDF). International Lake Environment Committee Foundation.
- NASA Earth Observatory (20 November 2011). "Suguta Valley, Kenya".
- "Sugutu Valley Crossing". Big Earth.
- Trillo, Richard (2002). Rough guide to Kenya. Rough Guides. ISBN 1-85828-859-2.
- "Walking Jade Sea Journey". Wild Horizons. Archived from the original on 26 April 2012.
