= The Great Rift: Africa's Wild Heart =

- Region 2 DVD cover
- Also known as: The Great Rift
- Genre: Nature documentary
- Narrated by: Hugh Quarshie
- Composer: Barnaby Taylor
- Country of origin: United Kingdom
- Original language: English
- No. of episodes: 3

Production
- Executive producer: Mike Gunton
- Producer: Phil Chapman
- Running time: 176 minutes
- Production companies: BBC Natural History Unit; Animal Planet

Original release
- Network: BBC Two
- Release: 24 January – 7 February 2010

The Great Rift: Africa's Wild Heart (released in the US as The Great Rift: Africa's Greatest Story) is a British nature documentary series, which began airing on BBC Two on 24 January 2010. A BBC/Animal Planet co-production, the three-part series focuses on the landscape and wildlife of the Great Rift Valley in East Africa. At the end of each fifty-minute episode, a ten-minute featurette, Inside The Great Rift, takes a behind-the-scenes look at the challenges of filming the series.

The series made its US broadcast premiere in August 2010 on Animal Planet, as a two-hour special with the shortened title Great Rift. Hugh Quarshie narrated both the BBC and Animal Planet versions.

== Episodes ==
=== Episode 1: "Fire" ===
UK broadcast 24 January 2010, 2.05 million viewers (7.3% audience share)

The opening programme shows how life has adapted to the volcanic highlands bordering the Rift Valley. Volcanic activity created the Ethiopian Highlands 30 million years ago, and is still evident at Erta Ale's molten lava lake. Further south, it thrust up huge peaks such as Kilimanjaro and Mount Kenya. The mountain hyrax, augur buzzard, giant lobelia and side-striped chameleon are some of the species filmed on the latter's storm-blasted mountain slopes. In the Aberdares, an older, more eroded range, elephants and mountain bongos are marooned by surrounding human development. In the central Rift Valley, giant mastiff bats roost in a cave beneath the collapsed lava plateau of Mount Suswa. Infrared cameras reveal the activities of the bats and their unusual cohabitants, a troop of baboons. Ol Doinyo Lengai is Africa's most active volcano. The 2007 eruption showered the Serengeti plains with ash, ideal fertiliser for the grass that supports the vast game herds. To the south, the remote Kitulo Plateau in Tanzania is attracting considerable scientific attention due to its unique flora and fauna. The programme includes the first professional footage of the kipunji, a rare primate discovered in 2005. Other species shown include the montane widowbird, the Temple's chameleon and various monkey beetles. The final scenes show mountain gorillas in the Virunga Mountains. Inside the Great Rift shows how the crew enlisted the help of a local Maasai tribe to film inside Mount Suswa's cave.

=== Episode 2: "Water" ===
UK broadcast 31 January 2010, 1.81 million viewers (6.7% audience share)

The second episode explores East Africa's rich variety of freshwater and marine habitats. The Rift Valley's seasonal rains replenish a network of rivers which sustain life through the prolonged dry periods. The dry season affects animals differently. Elephants congregate on riverbanks and reinforce social bonds, while bee-eaters arrive to build nest holes in the exposed mud cliffs. For river hippos, it's a time of tension as hundreds of animals jostle for position in the remaining deep water channels. The hippos of Mzima, by contrast, have a guaranteed year-round water supply thanks to the natural volcanic spring. For the first time, cameras film bottom-dwelling crabs and Bathyclarias catfish in the depths of Lake Malawi. In calm conditions, clouds of midges emerge to mate and lay their eggs on the lake's surface. At night, local fishermen trawl for shoals of ucepa, which are drawn to the surface to feed on the midge larvae. Few creatures can survive in the caustic lakes of the Eastern Rift Valley. In Lake Natron, a tilapia swims too close to a thermal vent with fatal results. Aerial shots show the million-strong colony of lesser flamingos on Lake Bogoria. At its northern extreme, the Rift Valley plunges into the Red Sea. The final sequences show the diversity of marine life off the coast of Djibouti, including a group of whale sharks filter-feeding at Ghoubet. Inside the Great Rift shows how a submersible ROV was lowered into a reef crack to capture shots of deep sea life.

=== Episode 3: "Grass" ===
UK broadcast 7 February 2010, 1.73 million viewers (6.5% audience share)

The final programme documents the Rift Valley's savannah ecosystem. In the rain shadow of the Ruwenzori Mountains, rainfall is sporadic. Acacias are the only trees that can survive the prolonged droughts, but their proliferation is curbed by browsing animals. Giraffes, gerenuks and dik-diks are all specialist acacia eaters, but elephants are the true architects of the landscape. On the plains, grass is the dominant vegetation, sustaining the largest grazing herds on earth. Antelopes use the long grass to conceal their young from lions, cheetahs and other predators. A unique starlight camera enables filming to continue after dark using available light, revealing hitherto unseen behaviour. In the pitch blackness, three lion cubs practise their hunting skills as their mother digs warthog piglets from their burrow. Hippos roam the grasslands by night, but must return to water before sunrise. At the isolated pools of Mzima, stranded hippos starve to death during the prolonged drought of 2009. Those animals that can follow the rains of the Rift Valley on seasonal migrations. Olive baboons are one of the few primates adapted to the savannah, but even they must return to the safety of the trees at night. Despite their well-developed brains, chimpanzees are confined to forested areas such as Kibale in Uganda. The final scenes suggest that the Rift Valley, where our human ancestors stepped out of the forest, is the "cradle of humanity". Inside the Great Rift reveals the challenges of capturing the first starlight footage of sleeping chimps.
