= Mount Longonot =

Volcano in Kenya

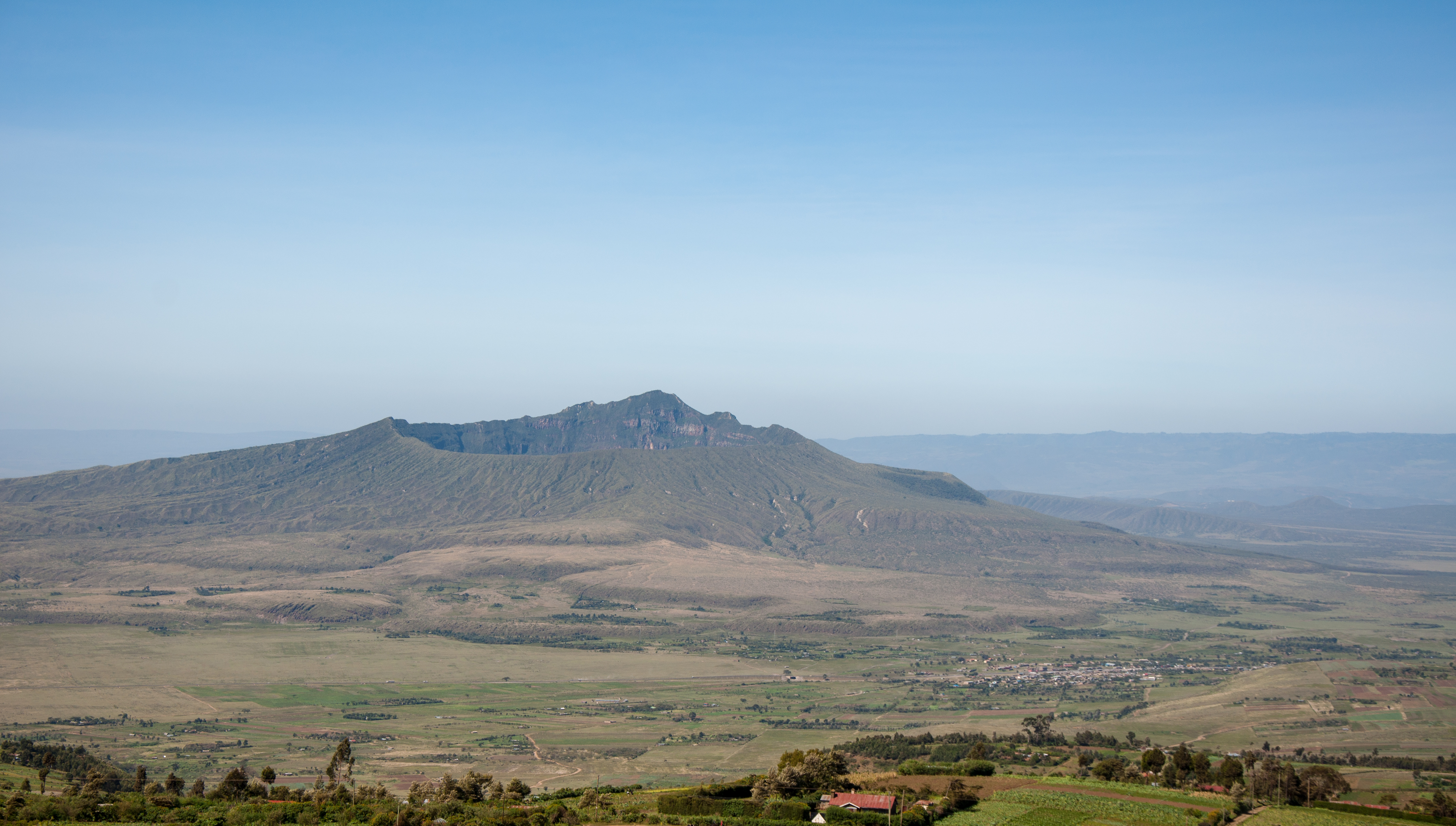

Highest point
- Elevation: 2,776 m (9,108 ft)
- Listing: Volcanoes in Kenya
- Coordinates: 0°54′55″S 36°27′25″E

Naming
- Native name: Oloonong'ot (Masai)

Geography
- Location within Kenya
- Location: Great Rift Valley, Kenya

Geology
- Formed by: Volcanism along the Gregory Rift
- Mountain type: Stratovolcano
- Last eruption: 1863 ± 5 years

Climbing
- Easiest route: Scramble

Mount Longonot is a stratovolcano located southeast of Lake Naivasha in the Great Rift Valley of Kenya, Africa. It is thought to have last erupted in the 1860s. Its name is derived from the Maasai word Olongongot, meaning "mountains of many spurs" or "steep ridges".

Mount Longonot is protected by the Kenya Wildlife Service as part of Mount Longonot National Park. A 3.1 km (1.9 mi) 3.1-km (1.9-mile) trail runs from the park entrance up to the crater rim, and continues in a 7.2-km (4.5-mile) loop encircling the crater. The whole tour (gate-around the rim-gate) of 13 km (8.1 mi) takes about 4–5 hours allowing for necessary rest breaks - parts of the trail are heavily eroded and very steep. The gate elevation is around 2,150 m (7,050 ft), and the peak at 2,776 m (9,108 ft), but following the jagged rim involves substantially more than the 630-meter (2,070-foot) vertical difference.

Mount Longonot is 60 km (37 mi) northwest of Nairobi and may be reached from there by a tarmac road. A nearby town is also named Longonot. The Longonot satellite earth station is located south of the mountain.

== Geology ==
Longonot is a stratovolcano which contains a large 48-square-kilometer (19-square-mile) caldera formed by vast eruptions of trachytic lava some 21,000 years ago. The current summit cone was developed within the earlier caldera. This cone itself is capped by a 1.8-kilometer (1.1-mile) crater. The mountain has several parasitic cones and effusive lava eruptions occur on the flanks and within the caldera floor. Periodic geodetic activity recorded at Longonot in 2004–2006 demonstrated the presence of active magmatic systems beneath this volcano.

As of 2018, geothermal projects struggle to explore the potential.

== Flora and fauna ==
A forest of small trees covers the crater floor, and small steam vents are found spaced around the walls of the crater. The mountain is home to various species of wildlife, notably plains zebra, giraffe, Thomson's gazelle, buffaloes and hartebeest.

The crater is popular for hiking, bird and game watching that is enhanced by the flora and fauna on the slopes of the mountain.

== Notable events ==
On March 21, 2009, bush fires burned up the side of the mountain and descended into the crater, trapping wildlife and feeding on drought-ravaged brush.

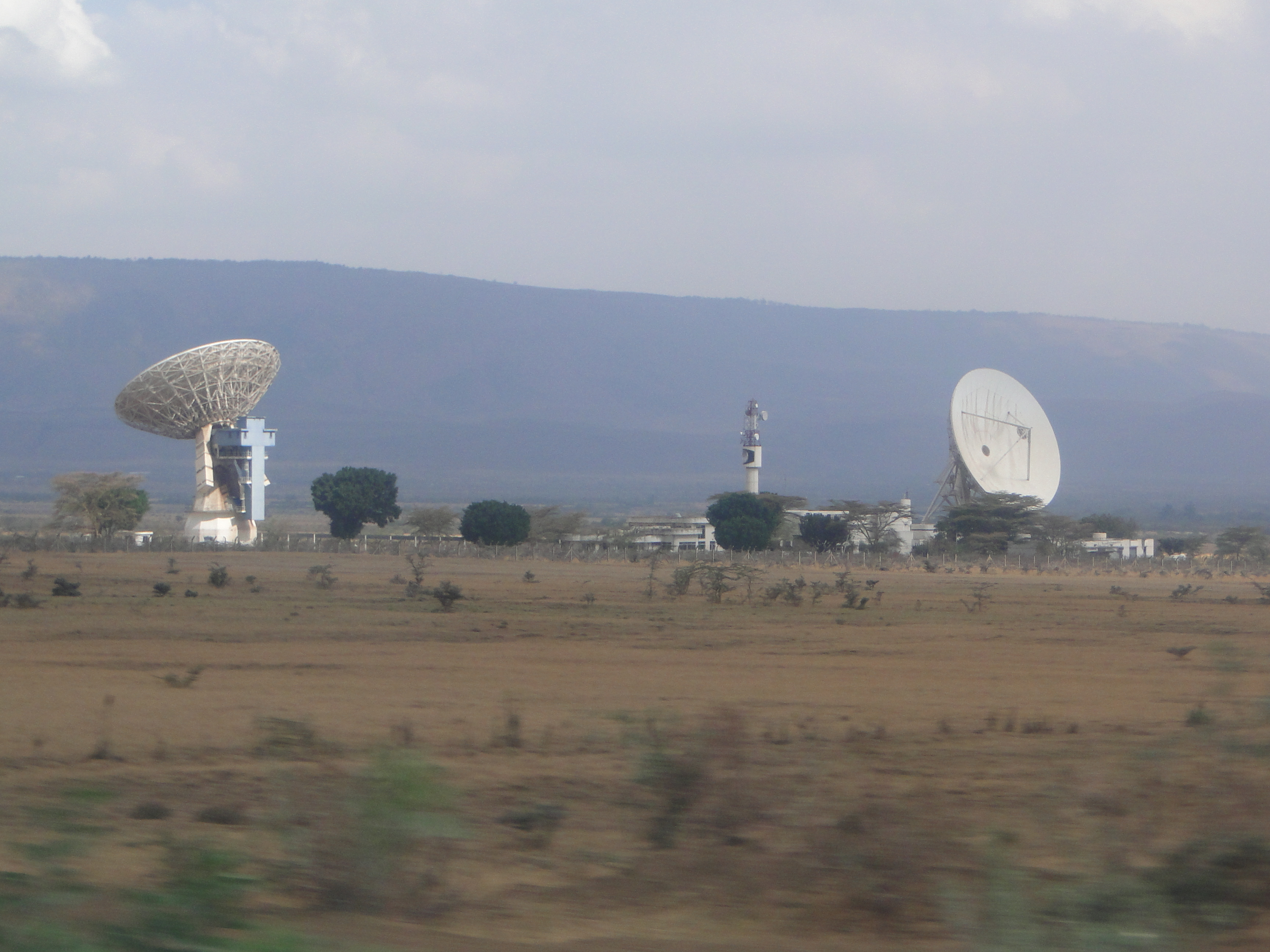
Longonot Earth Station 2010

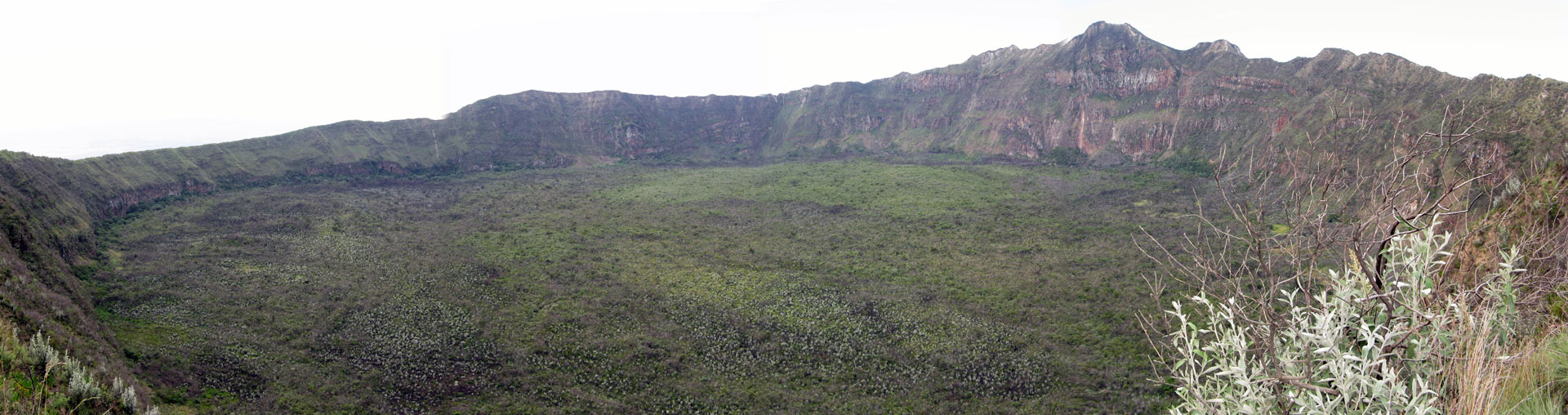
Panoramic view of Mount Longonot crater in 2010

== See also ==
- Mount Suswa
