= Emuruangogolak =

Active shield volcano in Kenya

- Location within Kenya

Highest point
- Elevation: 1,285 m (4,216 ft)
- Coordinates: 1°30′N 36°20′E

Geography
- Location: Kenya

Geology
- Formed by: Volcanism along the Gregory Rift
- Rock age: Pleistocene to recent
- Last eruption: 1910 ± 50 years

Emuruangogolak is an active shield volcano straddling the Gregory Rift in Kenya, in Eastern Africa. It has a 3.5-by-5.0-kilometre (2.2 mi × 3.1 mi) caldera on its summit. The last known eruption was a trachyte flow which occurred in 1910. Steam vents and fumarolic activity continues from fissures within the caldera and along the flanks of the volcano. Several maar lakes exist in the rift valley adjacent to the volcano. The volcano's summit is at an elevation of 1,285 metres (4,216 ft), and its formation is calculated to have been 38,000 years ago.

== See also ==
- List of volcanoes in Kenya
