= Loriu Plateau =

Elevated Precambrian bedrock exposure in Kenya

- Location within Kenya

Highest point
- Peak: 1,463 m (4,800 ft)
- Coordinates: 02°30′00″N 36°20′00″E

Geography
- Country: Kenya
- State: Turkana

Geology
- Orogeny: Pliocene
- Rock age: Precambrian

Loriu Plateau is an elevated Precambrian bedrock exposure at the southwest margin of Lake Turkana in Kenya. The plateau is only seasonally habitable due to aridity and was once home to fauna otherwise rare in Turkana. Loriu is west of and adjacent to the Barrier Volcano at the southernmost portion of Lake Turkana.

== Location ==
Loriu is bounded by Lake Turkana to the east, Kapedo to the south, the Kerio River to the west, and Kerio River delta to the north. The plateau is 64 kilometers running from north to south, approximately 8 kilometers wide, and is capped by Tertiary volcanic lava flows. The western margin of Loriu rises gradually while the eastern margin is defined by a fault scarp more than 366 meters high in some locations. The maximum altitude of the plateau is 1,463 meters.

== Animal and plant life ==
The Turkana basin was previously home to a great diversity and number of animal species, many of which became the basis for names of both places and people in the region. A number of wild animals no longer found in the wider Turkana Basin, including oryx, greater kudu and ostrich, were found in the Loriu Plateau during early expeditions by outsiders.

Loriu includes a heterogeneous plant community with acacia trees, bush and sparse grassland. Portions of the plateau are too steep for vegetation.

== Geology ==
The Precambrian basement rock biotite-gneisses that form the underlying structure of Loriu were exposed during the plateau's formation through up faulting and tilting of the basement rock. These layers are clearly visible and form a major part of the stratigraphy of the Mugor scarp on the eastern edge of the plateau. Because of the gradual slope of the western plateau, Loriu is most likely not a horst.

Lavas capping Loriu are dated to the Pliocene, according to the East African Geological Research Unit. These lavas are primarily aphyric basalts, are grayish in color, trachytic in texture and composed of olivine. Other basalts contain olivine and pyroxene phenocrysts. To the west are a few mafic porphyritic basalts and possibly older Miocene basalts cut by dykes and faults. Olivine nephelinite has been collected near these basalts.

The southern margin of Loriu is also bounded by a major volcanic group around the Lomi caldera.

== See also ==
- Lake Turkana
- Turkana Basin
- East African Rift Valley
