= Great Rift Valley, Kenya =

Part of an intra-continental ridge system that runs through Kenya

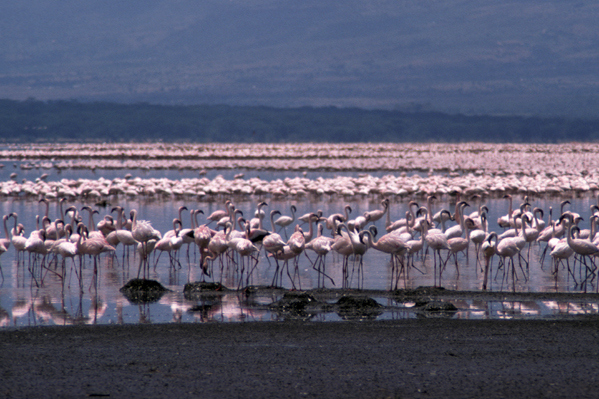
Lake Bogoria

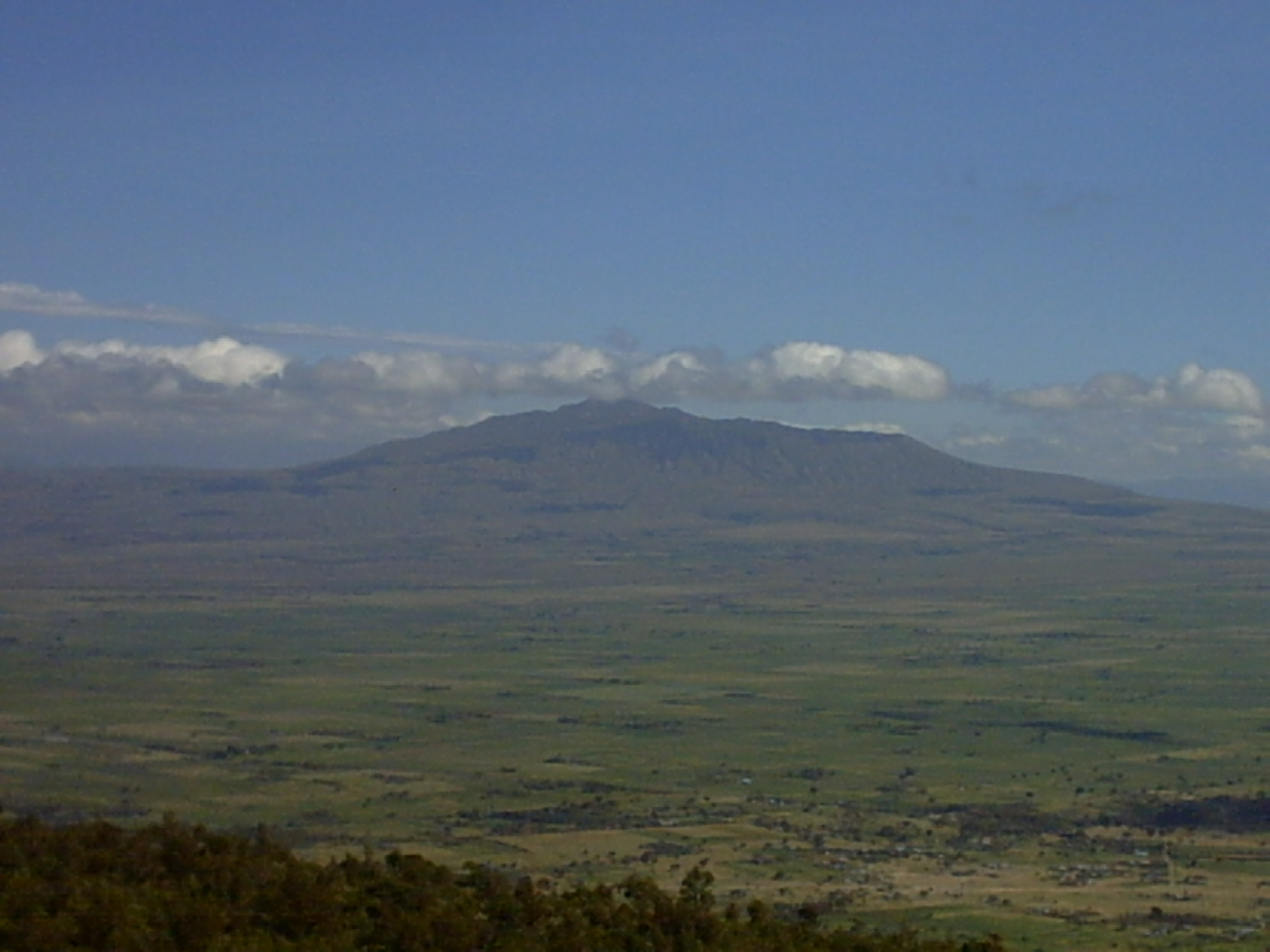
Mount Longonot

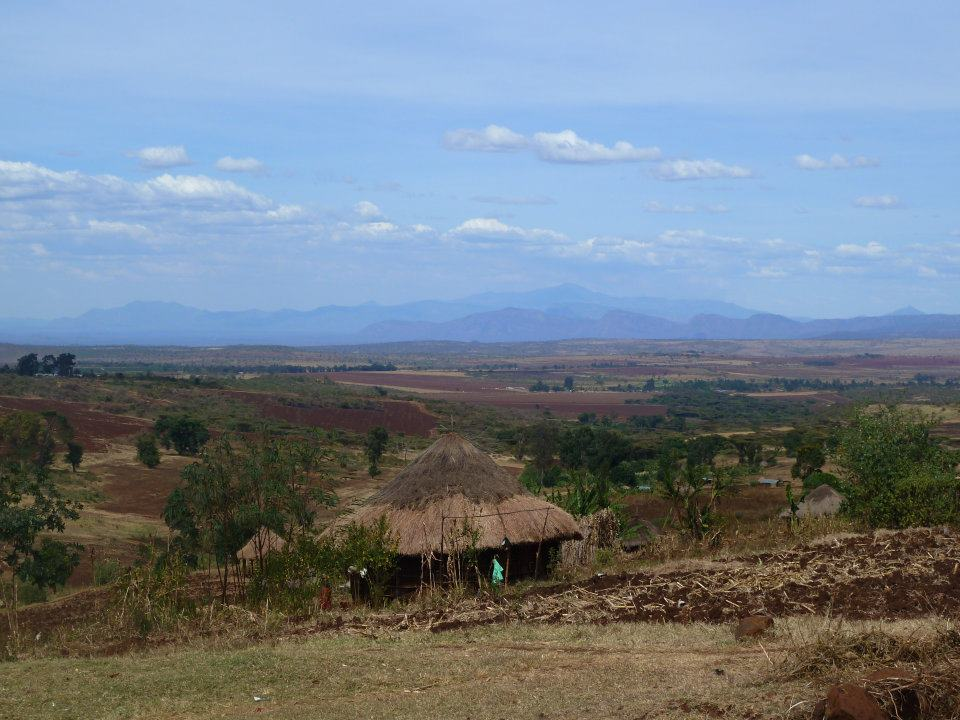
View of Uganda from Cherubei Village, Kenya

The Great Rift Valley is part of an intra-continental system of topographic depressions that runs through Kenya from north to south. It is part of the Gregory Rift, the eastern branch of the East African Rift, which starts in Tanzania to the south and continues northward into Ethiopia. It was formed on the "Kenyan Dome", a geographical upwelling created by the interactions of three major tectonic plates: the Arabian, Nubian, and Somali plates. In the past, it was seen as part of a "Great Rift Valley" that runs from Mozambique to Syria. Most of the valley falls within the former Rift Valley Province.

The valley contains the Cherangani Hills and a chain of volcanoes, some of which are still active. The climate is mild, with temperatures usually below 28 °C (82 °F). Most rain falls during the March–June and October–November periods. The Tugen Hills to the west of Lake Baringo contain fossils preserved in lava flows from the period 14 to 4 million years ago. The relics of many hominids, ancestors of humans, have been found here.

== Features ==
Main volcanoes and lakes in the rift valley

The valley is bordered by escarpments to the east and west. The floor is broken by volcanoes, some still active, and contains a series of lakes. Some of the soils are Andisols, fertile soils from relatively recent volcanic activity.

Lake Turkana occupies the northern end of the Great Rift Valley in Kenya. There are also volcanoes in Lake Turkana. The Suguta Valley, or Suguta Mud Flats, is an arid part of the Great Rift Valley directly south of Lake Turkana. The shield volcano Emuruangogolak straddles the valley to the south of Suguta, and further south Mount Silali and Paka rise from the valley floor. Paka is a shield volcano, with widespread geothermal activity. South of Paka are Mount Korosi, Lake Baringo and Lake Bogoria. Menengai is a massive shield volcano in the floor of the rift with a caldera that formed about 8,000 years ago. It overlooks Lake Nakuru to the south. This region also includes Lake Elementaita, Mount Kipipiri and Lake Naivasha.

The Hell's Gate National Park lies south of Lake Naivasha. In the early 1900s, Mount Longonot erupted, and ash can still be felt around Hell's Gate. Mount Longonot is a dormant stratovolcano located southeast of Lake Naivasha. Mount Suswa is a shield volcano located between Narok and Nairobi. Lava flows from the most recent eruptions are still not covered by vegetation, and may be no more than one hundred years old. Lake Magadi is the most southern rift valley lake in Kenya, although the northern end of Lake Natron in Tanzania reaches into Kenya.

The Elgeyo escarpment forms part of the western wall. The Kerio Valley lies between the Tugen Hills and the Elgeyo escarpment at an elevation of 1,000 metres (3,300 ft). There are large deposits of Fluorite in the Kerio Valley area. Further south the Mau Escarpment is a steep natural cliff approximately 1,000 m (3,300 ft) high, running along the western edge of the Great Rift Valley about Lake Naivasha. Yet further south the Nguruman Escarpment is around 50 kilometers long and elongated in N-W direction. Its northern edge is about 120 kilometres (75 mi) southwest of Nairobi, while the southern edge is near the Tanzanian border, at the northwestern corner of Lake Natron. The Aberdare Range forms a section of the eastern rim of the Great Rift Valley to the north of Nairobi. Mount Satima lies at the northern end of the Aberdares and is their highest point, and Mount Kinangop at the southern end is the second highest. The mountains form a ridge between these two peaks. Ngong Hills are peaks in a ridge along the east of the Great Rift Valley, located southwest near Nairobi.

== Lakes ==
Kenya Lake System in the Great Rift Valley
UNESCO World Heritage Site
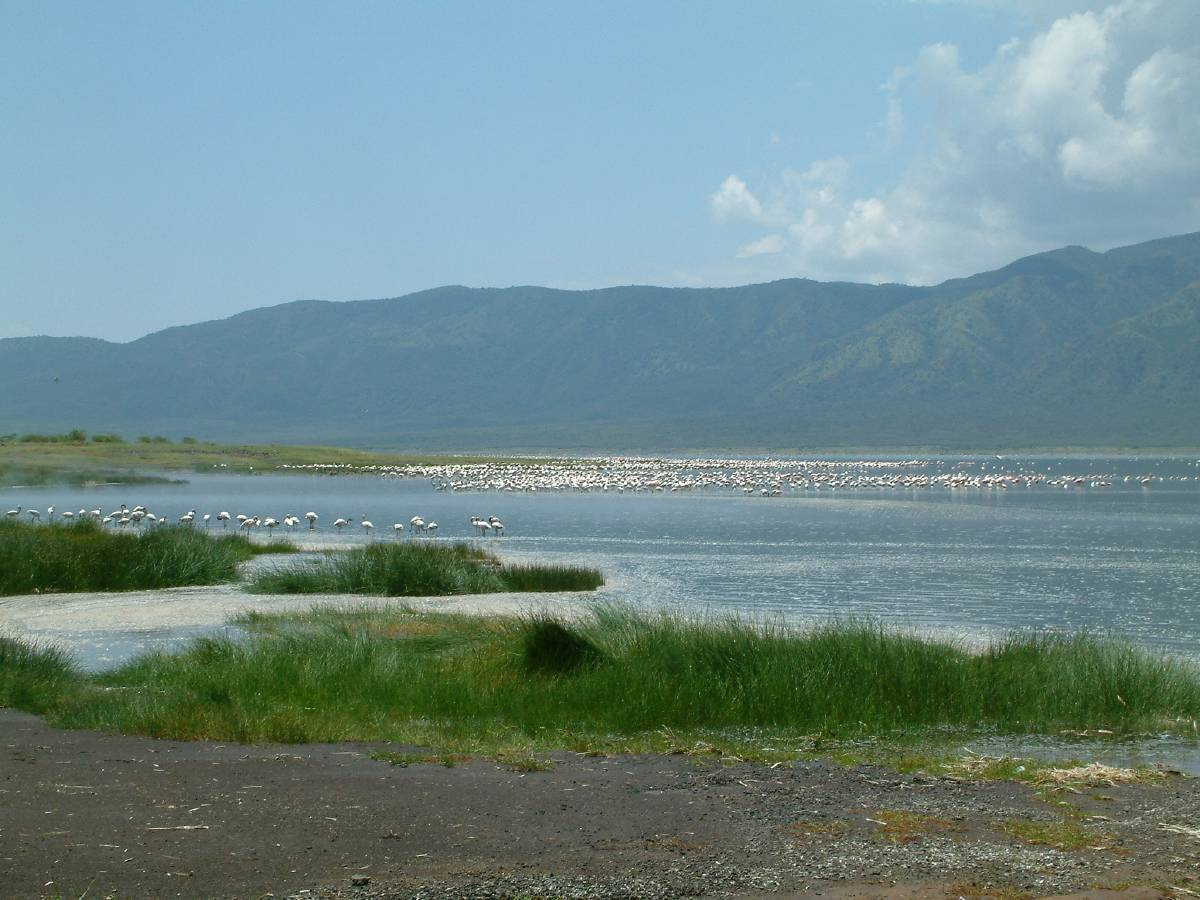
- Lake Bogoria, one of the main lakes in the Great Rift Valley.

- Location within Kenya
- Location: Rift Valley Province, Kenya
- Includes: 1. Lake Elmentaita; 2. Lake Nakuru; 3. Lake Bogoria
- Criteria: Natural: (vii), (ix), (x)
- Reference: 1060rev
- Inscription: 2011 (35th Session)
- Area: 32,034 ha (79,160 acres)
- Buffer zone: 3,581 ha (8,850 acres)
- Coordinates: 00°26′33″N 36°14′24″E

UNESCO World Heritage Site
- Official name: Lake Turkana National Parks
- Criteria: Natural: viii, x
- Reference: 801bis
- Inscription: 1997 (21st Session)
- Extensions: 2001

Kenya is home to 64 (9.50%) of the total lakes found within the continent of Africa. Eight of these make up the main lakes in the Kenyan Rift Valley. From north to south, the names of these lakes are Lake Turkana, Lake Logipi, Lake Baringo, Lake Bogoria, Lake Nakuru, Lake Elmenteita, Lake Naivasha, and Lake Magadi. Of those eight, only Lakes Baringo and Naivasha are fresh water.

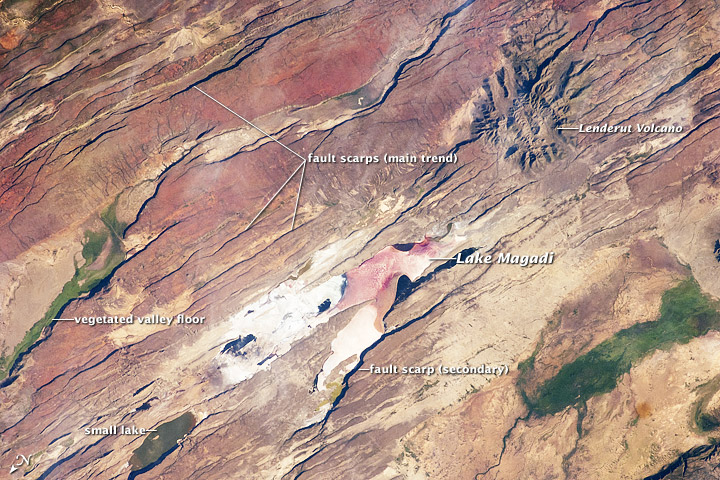
East African Rift Valley, Kenya ISS 2012

Lake Turkana, at the northern end of the rift, is 250 kilometres (160 mi) long, between 15 kilometres (9.3 mi) and 30 kilometres (19 mi) wide and is 125 metres (410 ft) at its greatest depth. Most of the other lakes are shallow and poorly drained, and therefore have become alkaline. They have waters that are rich in blue-green algae, which feed insect larvae, small crustaceans and lesser flamingos. The larvae and crustaceans are food for fish and greater flamingos. Massive flocks of these birds have been found to have an effect on the lakeside sediments also. Their numbers cause trampling of the silts in certain areas, while the feeding grounds are oxygenated due to probing beaks in the mud. Their nest mounds can also be preserved and cemented as the lake's water levels change. These form irregularities in the lakeside topography.

Trona, an evaporative mineral, used for sodium carbonate production, has been mined at Lake Magadi for nearly 100 years. It produces about 250,000 metric tonnes per year. Other precious minerals like rubies and pink sapphires have been found and mined from areas around Lake Baringo. In 2004, over 2 kilograms of Corundum were collected.

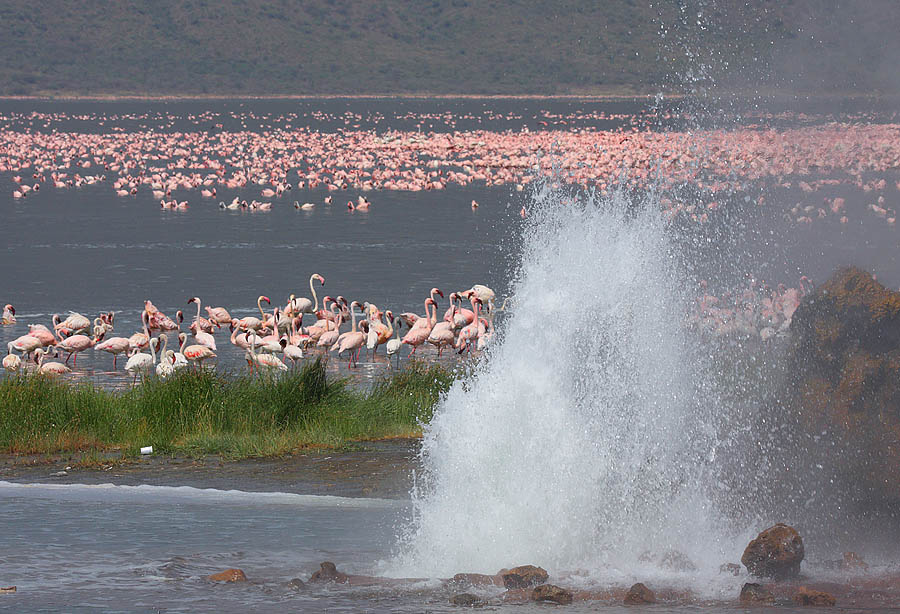
Lake Bogoria is a caustic cauldron fringed by geysers and populated by over a million flamingos.

Three shallow alkaline lakes and the surrounding lands make up the Kenya lake system: Lake Bogoria at 10,700 hectares (26,000 acres), Lake Nakuru at 18,800 hectares (46,000 acres) and Lake Elmenteita at 2,534 hectares (6,260 acres). This system has one of the most diverse populations of birds in the world, and is the home of thirteen globally threatened species of bird. It is an important nesting and breeding site for great white pelicans, and is the most important feeding area for lesser flamingos in the world. The system is home to globally important populations of black-necked grebe, African spoonbill, pied avocet, little grebe, yellow-billed stork, black-winged stilt, grey-headed gull and gull-billed tern.

The Kenya lake system is a key location on the West Asian-East African Flyway, a route followed by huge numbers of birds in their annual migration from breeding grounds in the north to wintering places in Africa. The lands around the lakes include large populations of black rhino, Rothschild's giraffe, greater kudu, lion, cheetah and wild dogs. The Kenya lake system is surrounded by the steep escarpment of the Rift Valley, which provides a spectacular backdrop.

Other lakes are Lake Chew Bahir, in the northeast extension. This lake lies mainly in Ethiopia but extends into Kenya in the rainy season. Lake Kamnarok is another small lake.

== Gallery ==
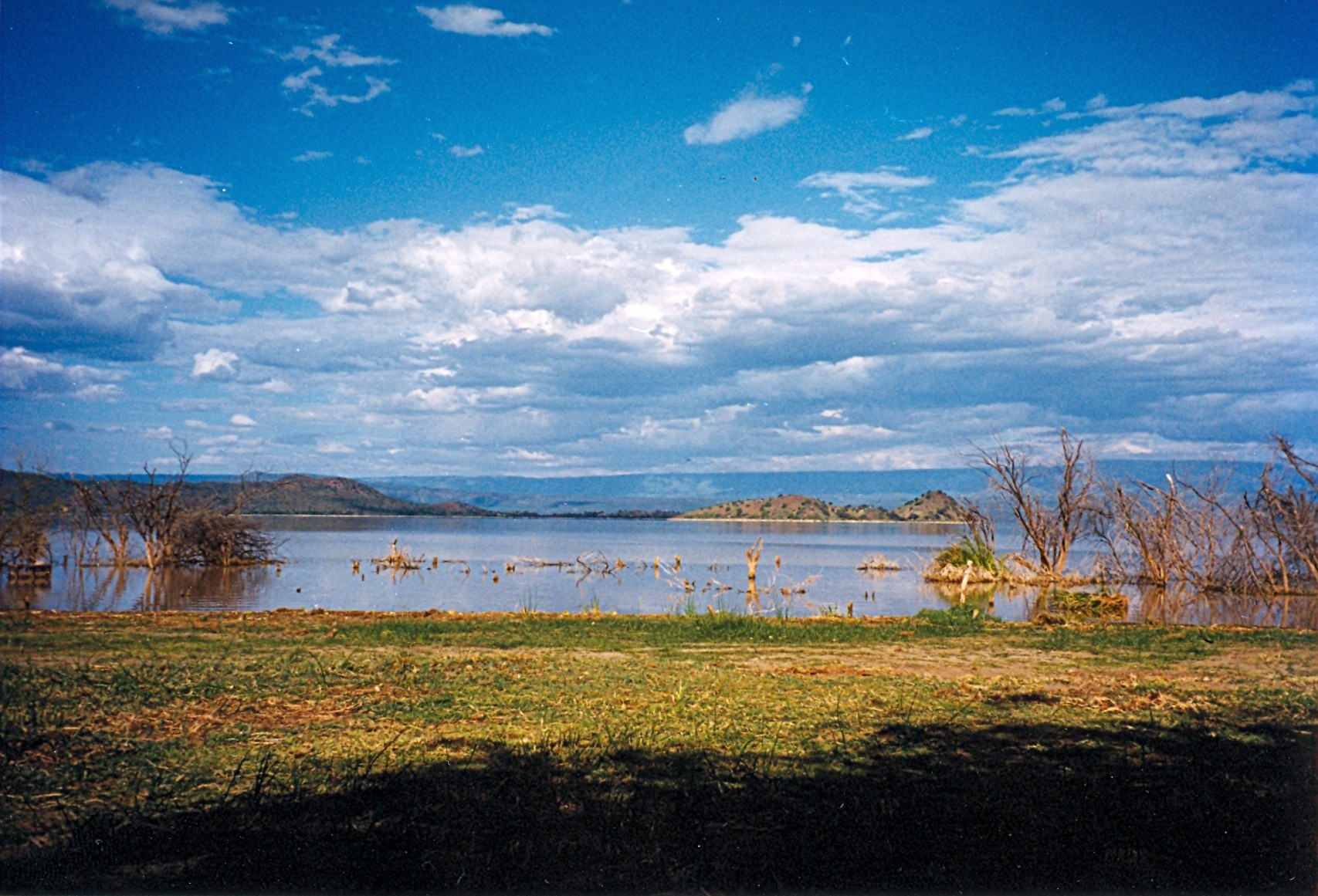
Lake Baringo, August 1999

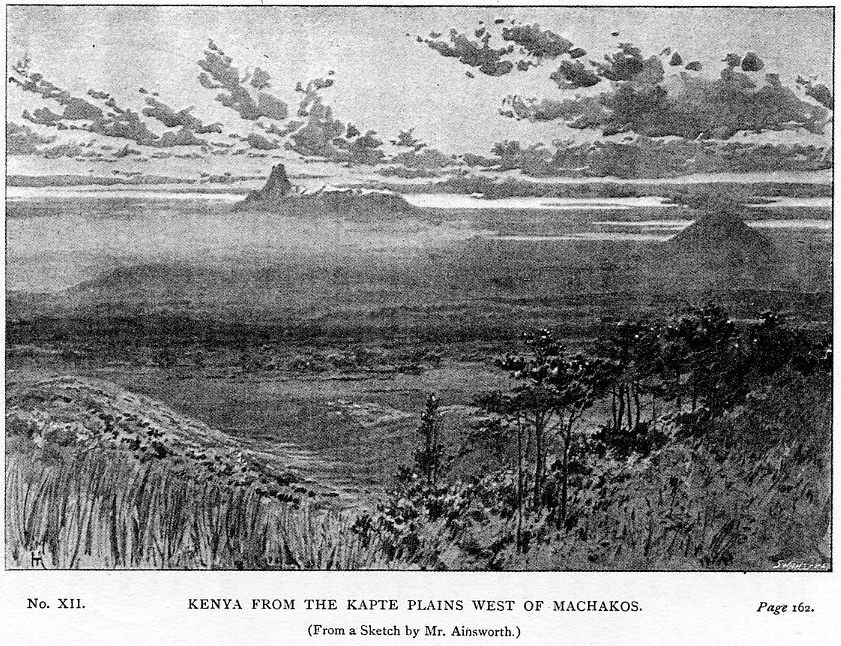
Sketch by John Walter Gregory from his expedition to East Africa in 1892-3. "[Mount] Kenya from the Kapte Plains west of Machakos"

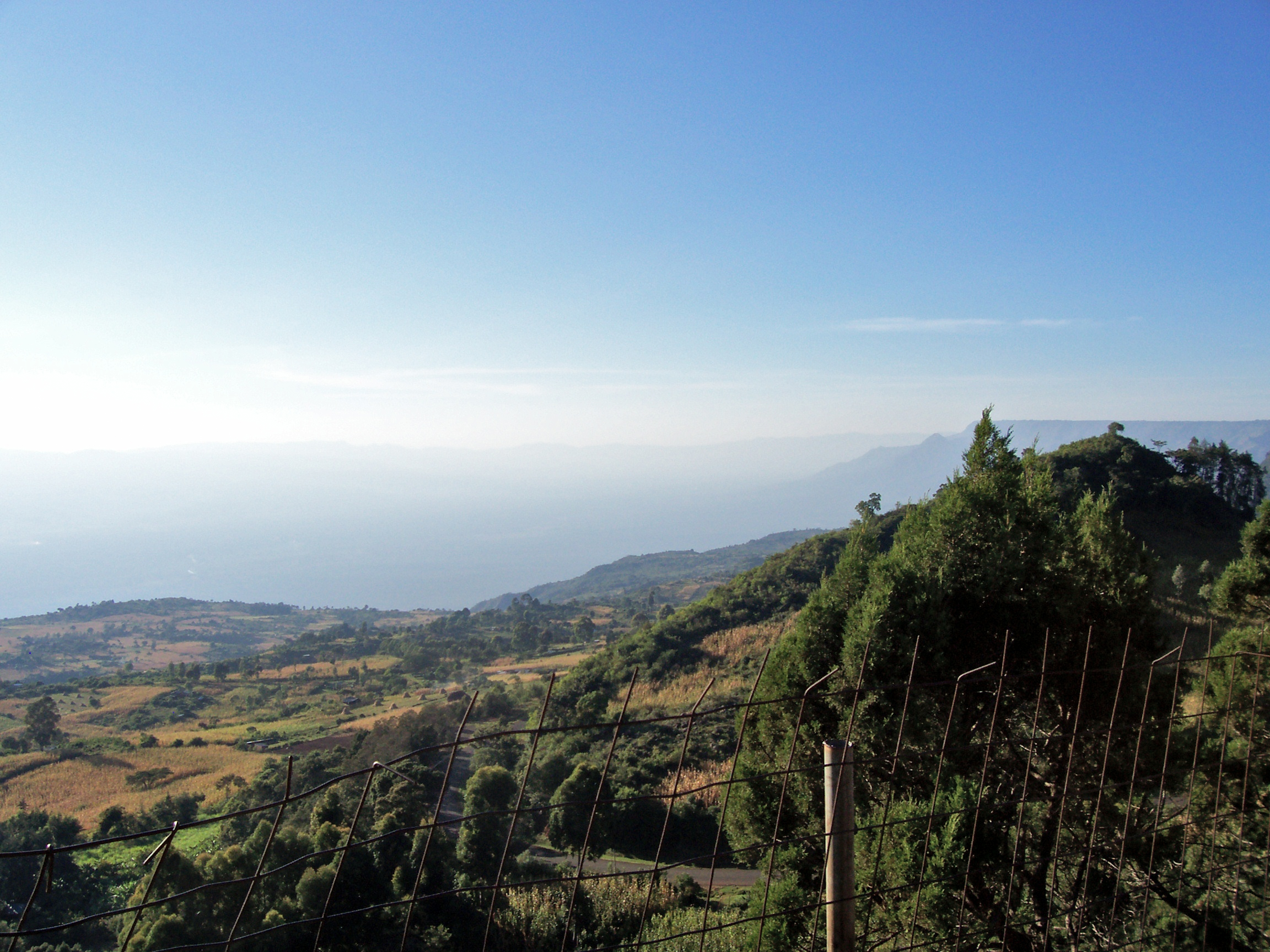
The Great Rift Valley from near Eldoret, Kenya in the fall of 2006

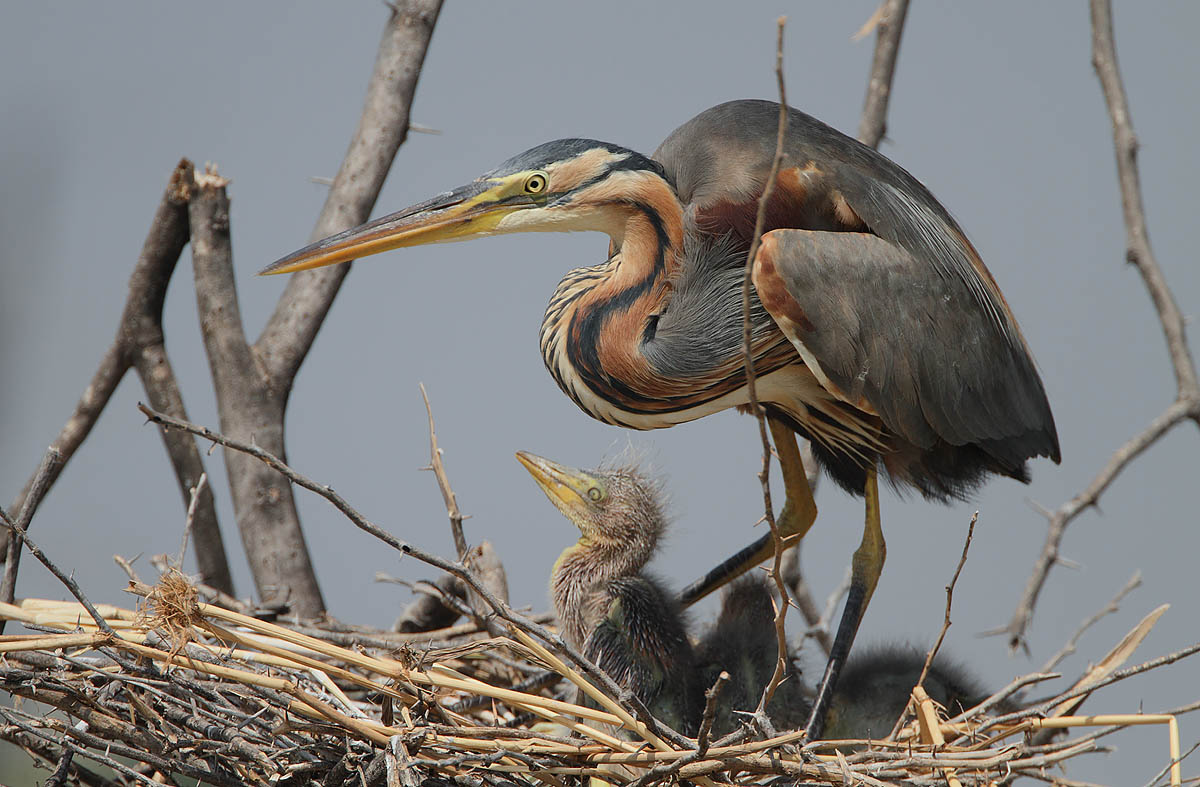
An adult purple heron with chicks on a nest at Lake Baringo

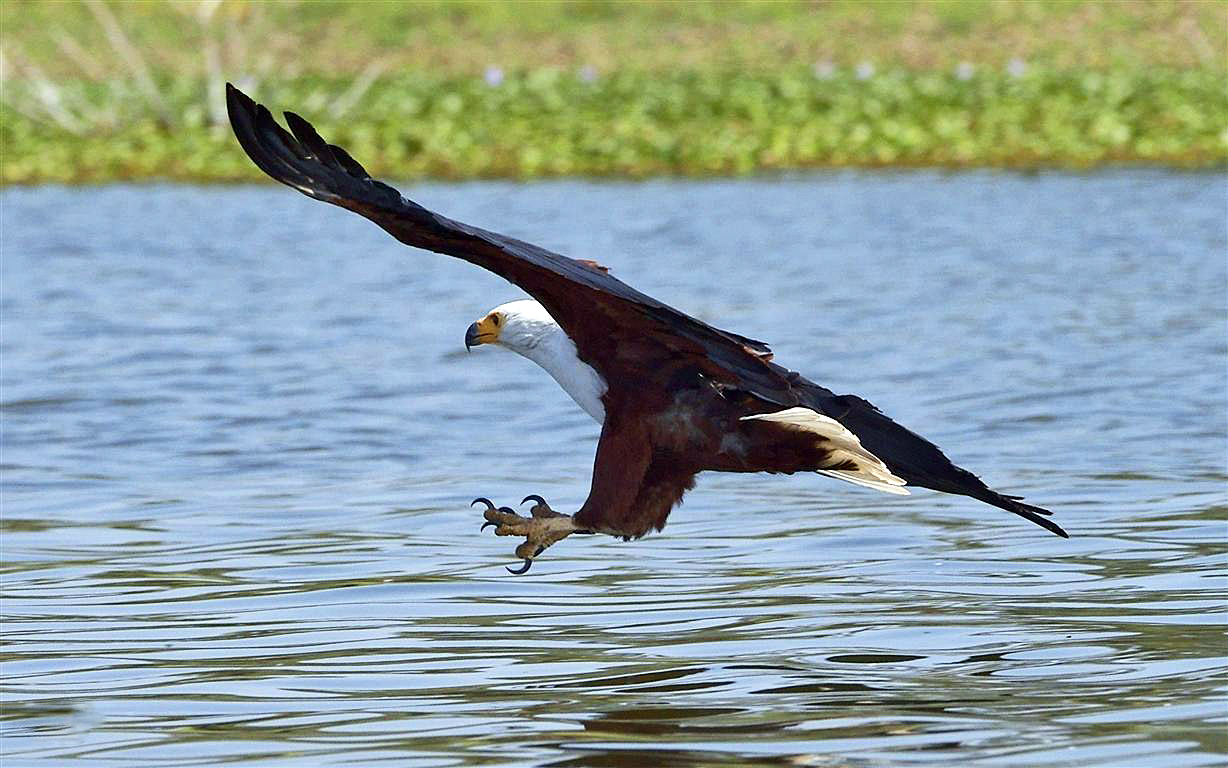
An African fish eagle about to catch a fish in Lake Naivasha

== See also ==
=== Prehistory ===
- Paleolithic

=== Ethnic groups ===
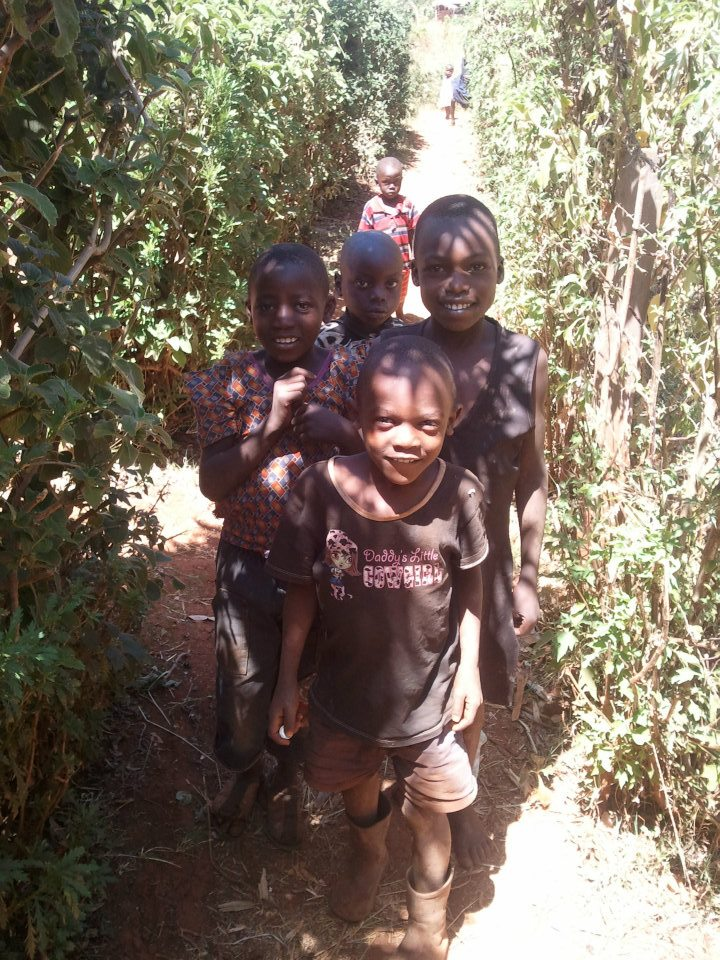
Luhya children at Endebess, Kenya

- Kalenjin people
- Ogiek language
- Afroasiatic Urheimat
- Omotik language
- Origins of Tutsi and Hutu
- Maasai people
- Elgeyo people
- Luhya people
- Sentinel Project for Genocide Prevention

=== Economy ===
- Rift Valley Railways
- Renewable energy in Africa
- Geothermal power in Kenya
- Science and technology in Africa
- Tourism in Kenya
- Magadi Soda Company
- Medical Emergency Relief International
- Red Maasai
- Changing rainfall patterns since the 1970s in Rift Valley, Kenya

=== People ===
- Happy Valley set
- Colin Fletcher
- Hank Wesselman
- Saba Douglas-Hamilton
- Robert Philp (missionary)
- Beryl Markham
- Kuki Gallmann

=== In popular culture ===
- The Great Rift: Africa's Wild Heart
- I Dreamed of Africa (book)
- Out of Africa (film)
- Mogambo
- Unsinkable Seven

== Sources ==
- Britton, J. Roberts; Harper, D. M. (August 2006). "Length–weight relationships of fish species in the freshwater rift valley lakes of Kenya". Journal of Applied Ichthyology. 22 (4): 334–336. doi:10.1111/j.1439-0426.2006.00769.x. hdl:2381/24575.
- Anadón, P.; Cabrera, Ll; Kelts, K. R. (1991). Lacustrine facies analysis. John Wiley & Sons. ISBN 978-0-632-03149-8.
- Firestone, Matthew (2009). Kenya. Lonely Planet. ISBN 978-1-74104-773-8.
- "HELL'S GATE INTRODUCTION". WebKenya. Archived from the original on 2012-08-13.
- "Menengai". Smithsonian.
- Singh, Ashbindu (2006). Africa's Lakes: Atlas of Our Changing Environment. United Nations Environment Programme. ISBN 92-807-2694-3.
- "Suswa". Smithsonian.
- UNESCO. "Kenya Lake System in the Great Rift Valley".
