= Paka (volcano) =

Volcano in Kenya

- Location within Kenya

Highest point
- Elevation: 1,697 m (5,568 ft)
- Coordinates: 0°55′10″N 36°11′29″E

Geography
- Location: Kenya

Geology
- Formed by: Volcanism along the Gregory Rift
- Mountain type: Shield volcano
- Last eruption: 7550 BCE ± 1000 years

Paka is a shield volcano located in the Great Rift Valley, Kenya. Geothermal activity is widespread in Paka. Paka means "ochre" in Pokot.

== See also ==
- List of volcanoes in Kenya
