= Korosi =

Shield volcano in Kenya

- Location within Kenya

Highest point
- Elevation: 1,446 m (4,744 ft)
- Coordinates: 0°46′N 36°07′E

Geography
- Location: Kenya

Geology
- Formed by: Volcanism along the Gregory Rift
- Mountain type: Shield volcano
- Last eruption: Unknown

Korosi is a shield volcano located in the Gregory Rift at the northern end of Lake Baringo, Kenya.

== See also ==
- List of volcanoes in Kenya
