= Lake Logipi =

Lake in Kenya

- Location within Kenya Location within Africa
- Coordinates: 2°14′N 36°34′E
- Primary inflows: hot springs
- Basin countries: Kenya
- Max. length: 6 km (3.7 mi)
- Max. width: 3 km (1.9 mi)
- Max. depth: 3–5 m (9.8–16.4 ft)

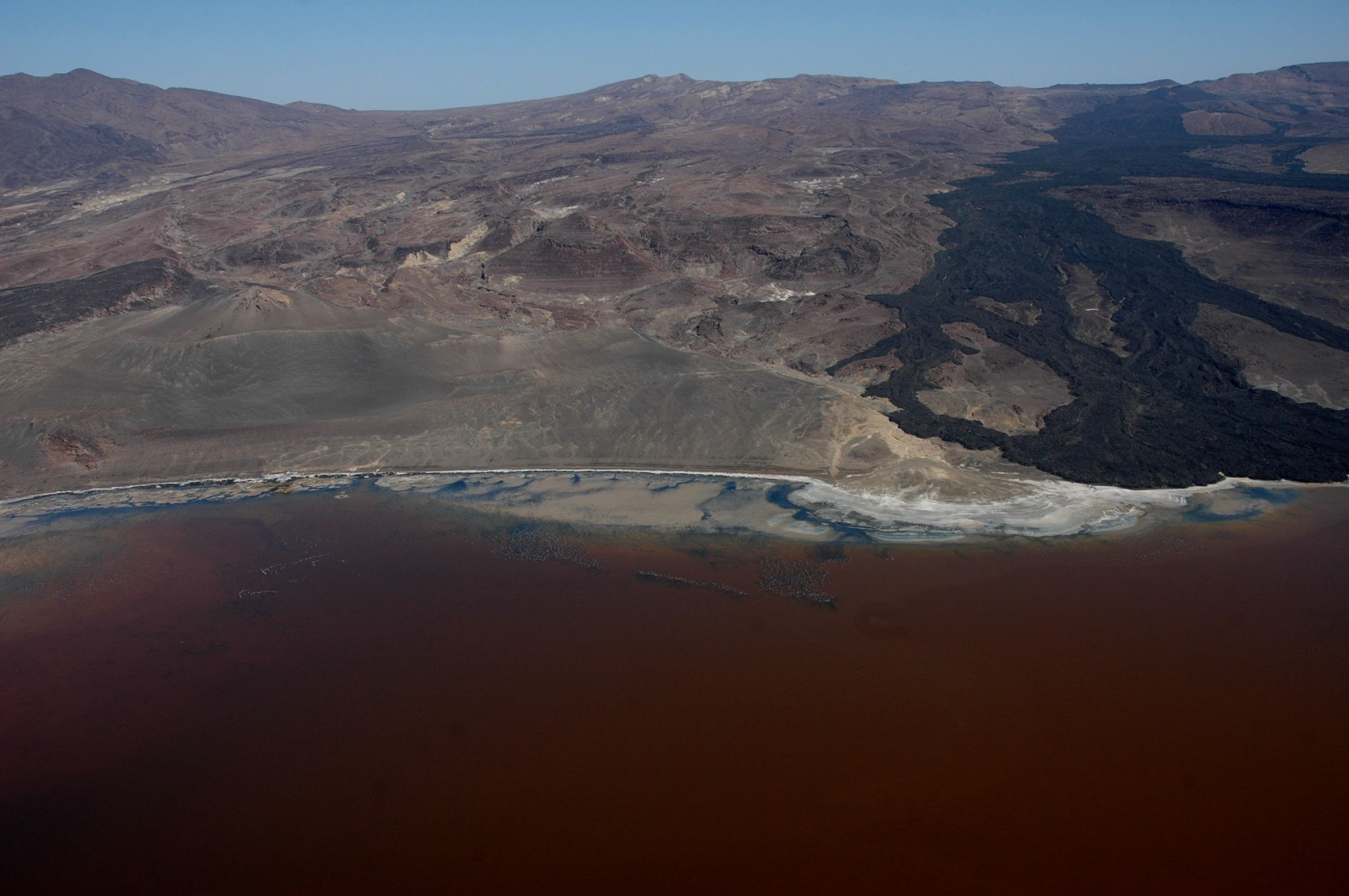
The lake from above

Lake Logipi is a saline, alkaline lake that lies at the northern end of the arid Suguta Valley in the northern Kenya Rift. It is separated from Lake Turkana by the Barrier volcanic complex, a group of young volcanoes that last erupted during the late 19th century or early 20th century. Saline hot springs discharge on the northern shoreline of Lake Logipi and at Cathedral Rocks near its southern limit, and help to maintain water at times of extreme aridity. During the rainy season, the lake is also recharged from the Suguta River which flows northward along the Suguta Valley, periodically forming a temporary lake (Lake Alablab) that unites with Logipi.

Lake Logipi has a maximum depth of 3 to 5 m, and is about 6 km wide by 3 km long. Its waters are of sodium bicarbonate composition with a pH of 9.5-10.5 and salinity (total dissolved salts) that varies from less than 20 g/L to greater than 50 g/L. Efflorescent salt crusts (trona) are present around its margins. Flamingoes frequently inhabit the saline waters feeding on cyanobacteria (Arthrospira spp. - formerly termed Spirulina) and other plankton.

Lake Turkana extended after extreme rainfalls in 2020 and overflowed Lake Logipi.

== See also ==
- Lake Suguta

== Bibliography ==
- Castanier, S., Bernet-Rollande, M.-C., Maurin, A., and Perthuisot, J.-P. 1993. Effects of microbial activity on the hydrochemistry and sedimentology of Lake Logipi, Kenya. Hydrobiologia, v. 267, p. 99–112.
