= Mount Suswa =

Shield volcano in Kenya

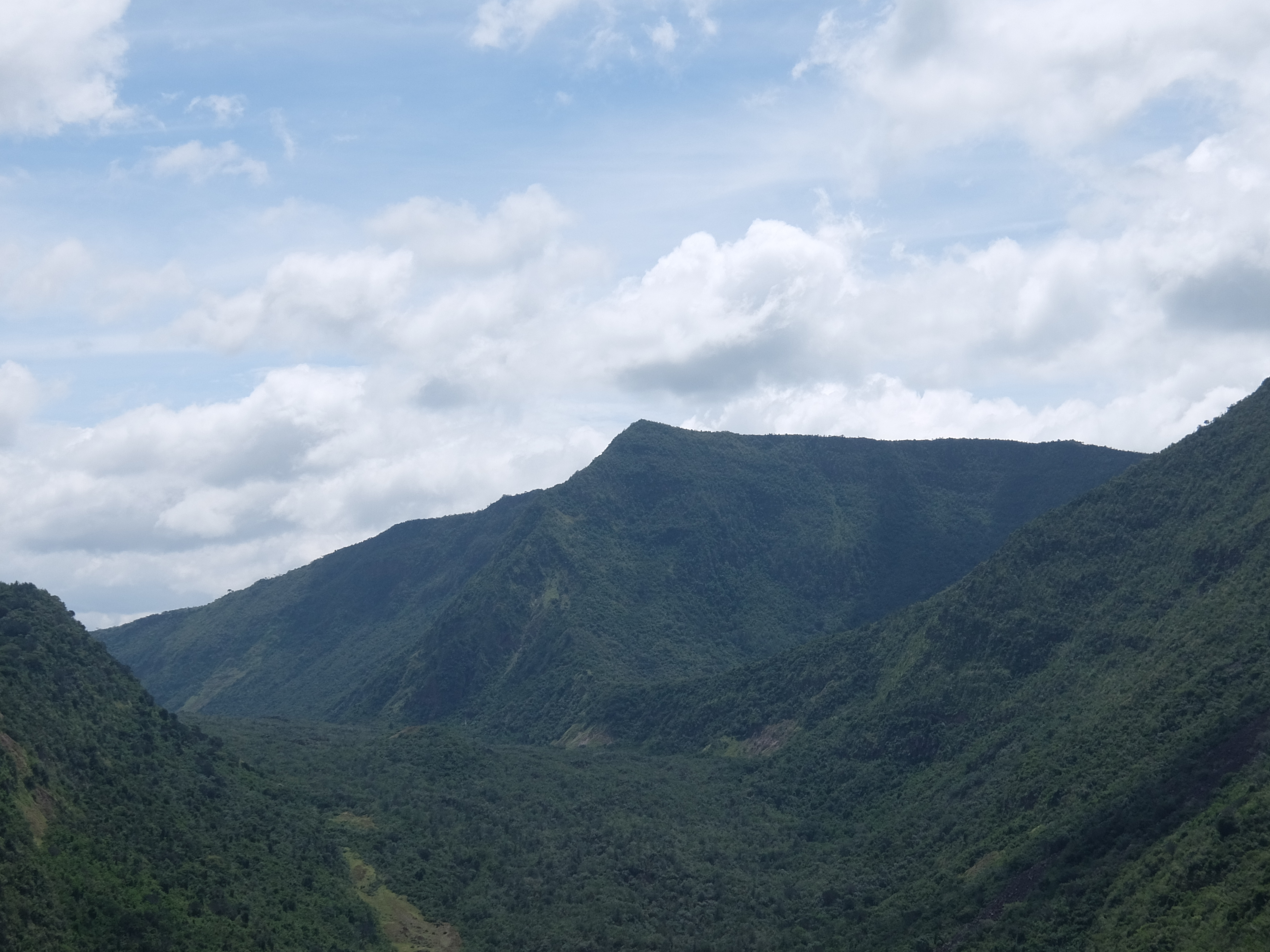

Highest point
- Elevation: 2,356 m (7,730 ft)
- Coordinates: 1°09′00″S 36°21′00″E

Geography
- Location within Kenya
- Location: Kenya

Geology
- Formed by: Volcanism along the Gregory Rift
- Mountain type: Shield volcano
- Last eruption: Unknown

Climbing
- Easiest route: Rauch's Trail

Mount Suswa is a shield volcano in the Great Rift Valley, Kenya. It is located between Narok and Nairobi, the capital of Kenya. The northwestern part of Mount Suswa is in Narok County, while the eastern and southern parts are in Kajiado County. The town with the same name, Suswa, is just northwest of the mountain and it is the main access point for visits to the mountain.

== Physical features ==
Mount Suswa has a unique double crater with a moat-like inner crater surrounding a tilted block of rock. The mountain is also known for its lava tubes on the northeast side of the outer crater.

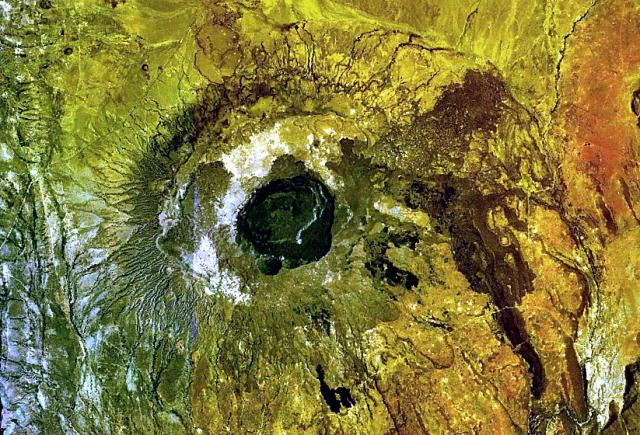
Satellite image of Mount Suswa

== Flora and Fauna ==
The inner crater is home to a variety of snakes species. Other wildlife of interest found on or near Mount Suswa includes zebras, giraffes, mongooses, turtles, hyenas and leopards.

== Mountaineering and Tourism ==
It is possible to drive up the lesser-end of the mountain into the outer crater with a four-wheel-drive vehicle or motorbike; however, there are numerous barricades across the trail where members of the Mount Suswa Conservancy collect fees for allowing you through. Arrangements can be made to pay a set fee and get a guide to take you past the barricades.

It is also possible to climb the mountain, which has a 2,356-meter summit. There are no specified paths, but Mount Suswa is best accessed from the mountain from the north and northeast. The Suswa Primary school, located at the base of the mountain, is another practical starting point. Also, there are many Masaai homesteads surrounding the base of the mountain; it is recommended to introduce yourself to the head of the family if your route crosses such. With the exception of Rauch's Trail, there are no designated pathways to the summit. However, the Masaai do graze cattle on the mountain's grasslands, making for the occasional route. The peak can be reached on foot by following Rauch's Trail, which begins approximately one-and-a-half kilometers from the summit, from the northeast. Rauch's Trail is marked with a wooden sign, overlooking the crater.

The network of lava caves on the east side of the mountain can also be visited and some of these caves are inhabited by baboons. The BBC documentary The Great Rift: Africa's Wild Heart, shows baboons entering one of these caves to seek shelter from leopards; this underground chamber in the rocks has been nicknamed 'baboon parliament'.

== See also ==
- List of volcanoes in Kenya
