= The Barrier (Kenya) =

Shield volcano in the north of Kenya

- Location within Kenya

Highest point
- Elevation: 1,032 m (3,386 ft)
- Listing: List of volcanoes in Kenya
- Coordinates: 2°19′09″N 36°35′16″E

Geography
- Location: Kenya

Geology
- Formed by: Volcanism along the Gregory Rift
- Mountain type: Shield volcano
- Last eruption: 1921 or 1922

The Barrier is an active shield volcano located in the north of Kenya. It is last known to have erupted in 1921.

== Description ==
The Barrier was given its name because it forms a barrier about 20 kilometres (12 mi) long across the Kenyan Rift Valley. It has a width of 15 kilometres (9.3 mi) and separates Lake Turkana to the north and the Suguta Valley and the small Lake Logipi to the south. The volcanic complex consists of four distinct volcanoes. From west to east these are Kalolenyang, Kakorinya, Likaiu West and Likaiu East. The foundation rocks are mainly basalt. About 90% of the volume is trachyte.

Kakorinya is the youngest of the group and forms the center of the complex, with a well-preserved circular crater that has not been breached. The 3.8 kilometres (2.4 mi) wide summit caldera of Kakorinya was formed about 92,000 years ago. Much of the floor of the caldera is filled with trachytic and phonolitic lava domes and flows that recently erupted within the caldera and along its ring fracture. There are scoria cones and lava flows from the early Holocene on the north and south flanks of the volcano complex. In the 19th and 20th centuries there have been explosive eruptions and lava flows from Teleki on the northern side and from Andrew's cone on the south side of Kakorinya. The last known eruption was in 1921.

== See also ==
- List of volcanoes in Kenya

== Sources ==
- "The Barrier". Global Volcanism Program. Smithsonian Institution.
- Woolley, Alan Robert (2001). Alkaline rocks and carbonatites of the world, Part 3. Geological Society. ISBN 1-86239-083-5.
