= Lake Baringo =

Freshwater lake in Kenya

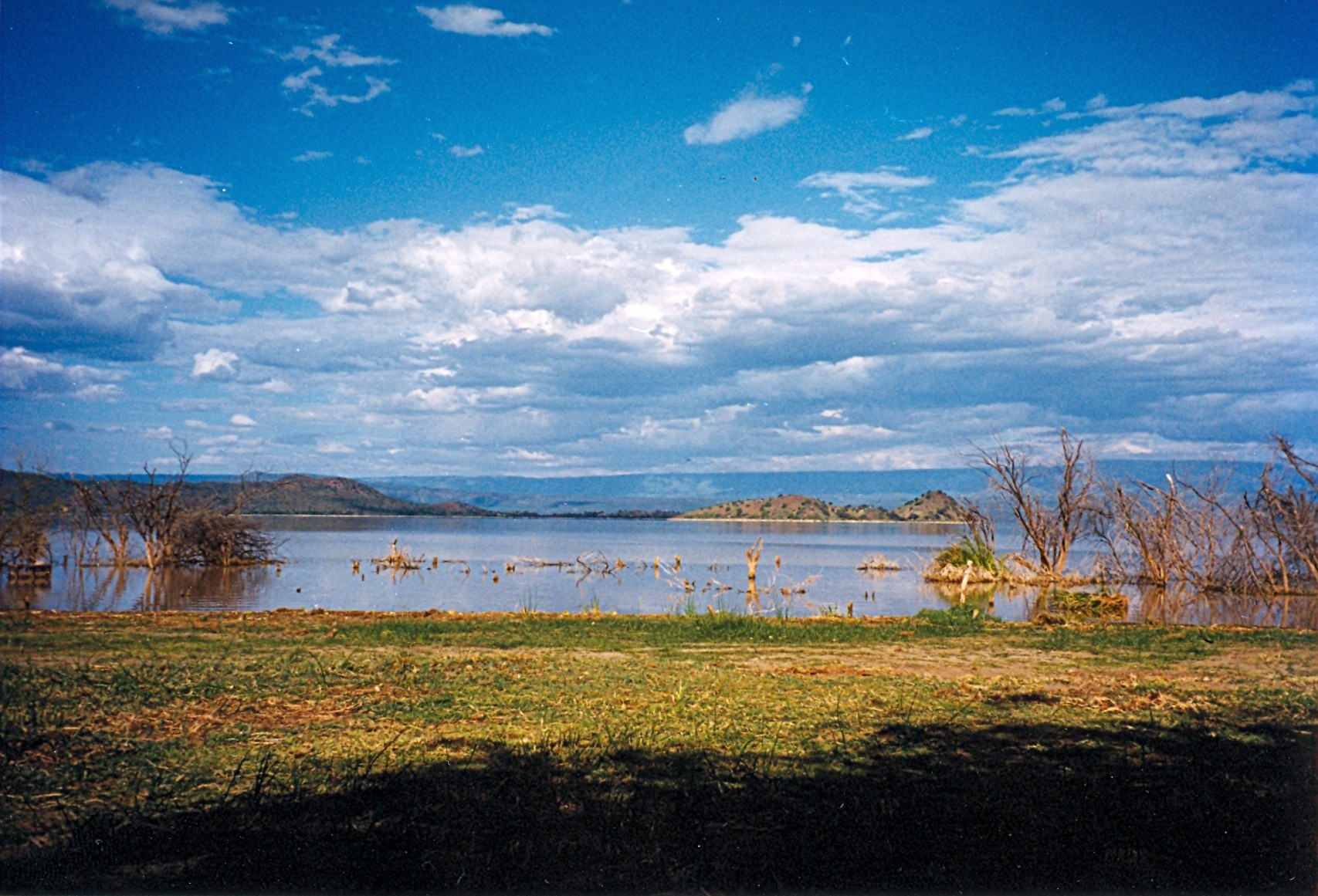

- Location within Kenya Location within Africa
- Coordinates: 0°38′N 36°05′E
- Primary inflows: Molo, Ol Arabel
- Basin countries: Kenya
- Surface area: 130 km^{2} (50 sq mi)
- Surface elevation: 1,000 m (3,300 ft)

Ramsar Wetland
- Designated: 10 January 2002
- Reference no.: 1159

Lake Baringo is, after Lake Turkana, the northernmost of the Kenyan Rift Valley lakes. It has a surface area of 130 square kilometres (50 sq mi) and an elevation of 970 metres (3,180 ft). The lake is fed by several rivers: the Molo, Perkerra and Ol Arabel. It has no obvious outlet; the waters are assumed to seep through lake sediments into the faulted volcanic bedrock. It is one of the two freshwater lakes in the Rift Valley in Kenya, the other being Lake Naivasha.

The lake is in a remote hot and dusty area with over 470 species of birds, occasionally including migrating flamingos. A Goliath heronry is located on a rocky islet in the lake known as Gibraltar.

The existence of Lake Baringo was first reported in Europe by Ludwig Krapf and J. Rebmann, German missionaries stationed at Mombasa, about 1850; in J. H. Speke's map of the Nile sources (1863) Baringo is confused with Kavirondo Gulf of Victoria Nyanza; it figures in Sir H. M. Stanley's map (1877) as a large sheet of water N.E. of Victoria Nyanza. Joseph Thomson, in his journey through the Masai country in 1883, was the European to see the lake and to correct the exaggerated notions as to its size. Native tradition, however, asserts that the lake formerly covered a much larger area.

== Description ==
The lake is part of the East African Rift system. The Tugen Hills, an uplifted fault block of volcanic and metamorphic rocks, lies west of the lake. The Laikipia Escarpment lies to the east.

Water flows into the lake from the Mau Hills and Tugen Hills. It is a critical habitat and refuge for more than 500 species of birds and fauna, some of the migratory waterbird species being significant regionally and globally. The lake also provides a habitat for seven fresh water fish species. One, Oreochromis niloticus baringoensis (a Nile tilapia subspecies), is endemic to the lake. Lake fishing is important to local social and economic development. Additionally the area is a habitat for many species of animals including the hippopotamus (Hippopotamus amphibius), Nile crocodile (Crocodylus niloticus) and many other mammals, amphibians, reptiles and the invertebrate communities.

While stocks of Nile tilapia in the lake are now low, the decline of this species has been mirrored by the success of another, the marbled lungfish (Protopterus aethiopicus) which was introduced to the lake in 1974 and which now provides the majority of fish from the lake. Water levels have been reduced by droughts and over-irrigation. The lake is commonly turbid with sediment, partly due to intense soil erosion in the catchment area, especially on the Loboi Plain south of the lake.

A characteristic of the country in the neighbourhood of the lake are the "hills" of the termites (white ants). They are hollow columns 10 to 12 ft. high and from 1 ft. to 18 in. broad. The greater kudu, almost unknown elsewhere in East Africa, inhabits the flanks of the Laikipia escarpment to the east of the lake and comes to the foot-hills around Baringo to feed.

A recent study showed that there were both positive and negative relationships between some water quality parameters and the prevalence of recovered parasites. O. niloticus baringoensis from Lake Baringo also recorded high parasite prevalence and this calls for sensitization of the public on the risks that may arise from the consumption of undercooked infected fish.

The lake has several small islands, the largest being Ol Kokwe Island. Ol Kokwe, an extinct volcanic centre related to Korosi volcano north of the lake, has several hot springs and fumaroles, some of which have precipitated sulfur deposits. A group of hot springs discharge along the shoreline at Soro near the northeastern corner of the island.

Several important archaeological and palaeontological sites, some of which have yielded fossil hominoids and hominins, are present in the Miocene to Pleistocene sedimentary sequences of the Tugen Hills.

The main town near the lake is Marigat, while smaller settlements include Kampi ya Samaki and Loruk. The area is increasingly visited by tourists and is situated at the southern end of a region of Kenya inhabited largely by pastoralist ethnic groups including Il Chamus, Rendille, Turkana and Kalenjin. Accommodation, (hotels, self-catering cottages and camping sites) as well as boating services are available at and near Kampi-Ya-Samaki on the western shore, as well as on several of the islands in the lake.

Since 2011, the water levels of Lake Baringo alongside neighbouring Lake Bogoria have rapidly risen. A Kenyan Government report in 2021 estimated that the surface area of Lake Baringo had increased by over 100% to 268 square kilometres between 2010 and 2020. The growth is being driven by above-average rainfall in the Rift Valley region. Increased sediment load from nearby deforestation has also reduced the lake's capacity to hold water. Lakeside villages and infrastructure were flooded, including schools and a health centre, and more than 40,000 people have been displaced as of July 2026. There have also been increases in animal populations such as crocodiles, along with interactions between these animals and people.

== See also ==
- Rift Valley lakes
- Korosi, a volcano at the northern end of Lake Nakuru
