= Gregory Rift =

Eastern branch of the East African Rift fracture system

Gregory Rift (red shade) in East Africa

The Gregory Rift (Ufa la Gregori, in Swahili) is the eastern branch of the East African Rift fracture system. The rift is the result of the separation of the Somali plate from the Nubian plate, driven by a thermal plume. Although the term is sometimes used in the narrow sense of the Kenyan Rift, the larger definition of the Gregory Rift is the set of faults and grabens extending southward from the Gulf of Aden through Ethiopia and Kenya into northern Tanzania, passing over the local uplifts of the Ethiopian and Kenyan domes. Ancient fossils of early hominins, the ancestors of humans, have been found in the southern part of the Gregory Rift.

== Etymology ==
The Gregory Rift is named in honour of the British geologist John Walter Gregory who explored the geology of the rift in 1892–93 and 1919.

== Location ==
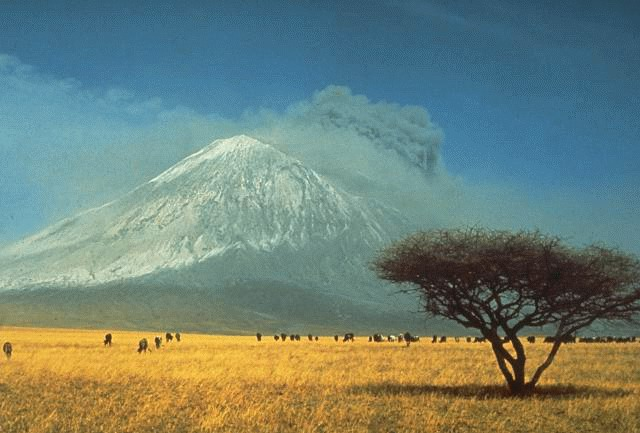
Ol Doinyo Lengai erupting in 1966

The Gregory Rift lies within the Mozambique Belt, often considered to be the remains of an orogenic system similar to the Himalayas. This belt runs from Ethiopia through Kenya, Tanzania and Mozambique. The rift is widest at the northern end in the Afar region, narrowing to a few kilometers in northern Tanzania, then splaying out in the North Tanzania Divergence.

The Gregory Rift has shoulders rising over 3,000 metres (9,800 ft) above sea level, 1,000 metres (3,300 ft) above the inner part of the graben. The Tanzanian portion includes Mount Kilimanjaro, the highest mountain in Africa, and the huge caldera of Ngorongoro in the Crater Highlands. This portion also contains Ol Doinyo Lengai, the world's only active carbonatite volcano.

Lakes in the rift other than Lake Turkana are mostly small and shallow, some with fresh water but many being saline. The thickness of lake sediments is mostly unknown. In Lake Turkana they seem to be at most 4 kilometres (2.5 mi) thick, in the Baringo – Bogoria half-graben from 500 metres (1,600 ft) to 1,000 metres (3,300 ft) thick and in the Afar depression up to 100 metres (330 ft) thick.

== Exploration ==
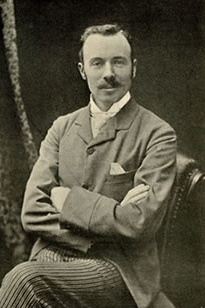
Joseph Thomson, first geologist to examine the region

The first well-known European geologist to explore the region was Joseph Thomson, a member of an expedition in 1879–80 sponsored by the Royal Geographical Society of Britain. From his observations he deduced the existence of a great fault.

Thomson returned in 1883, traveling through the rift valley in Kenya from Mount Longonot to Lake Baringo. Describing the valley around this lake he said: "Imagine if you can a trough or depression 3300 feet above sea level, and twenty miles broad, the mountains rising with very great abruptness on both sides to a height of 9000 feet". John Walter Gregory visited central Kenya in 1893 and again in 1919. His 1896 book The Great Rift Valley is considered a classic. Gregory was the first well-known European to use the term "rift valley", which he defined as "a linear valley with parallel and almost vertical sides, which has fallen owing to a series of parallel faults".

In 1913 German geologist Hans Reck made the first European study of the strata in the Olduvai Gorge to the west of the Crater Highlands. He brought a large collection of mammalian fossils back to Berlin. In 1928 anthropologist Louis Leakey visited Berlin where he saw that some of Reck's materials were artifacts. Leakey began exploring Olduvai in the 1930s and collecting material that has led to the site being recognized as an important center of early hominin occupation.

== Development ==
Volcanism and rifting started in Kenya in the northern region of Turkana between 40 and 35 million years ago (mya) and then spread north and south. To the south volcanism and rifting happened together, first in other parts of northern Kenya around 30 mya, then around 15 mya in the central part of the Kenyan Rift, 12 mya in southern Kenya and 8 mya in northern Tanzania. When rifting reached the Tanzanian Craton, the rift split into the eastern Gregory Rift and the western Albertine Rift, which are separated by the 1,300 kilometres (810 mi) wide East African Plateau. Large shield volcanoes near the margins of the craton and in the adjacent Mozambique belt issued large volumes of basaltic to trachytic magmatism between 5 and 1 mya, with faulting around 1.2 mya.

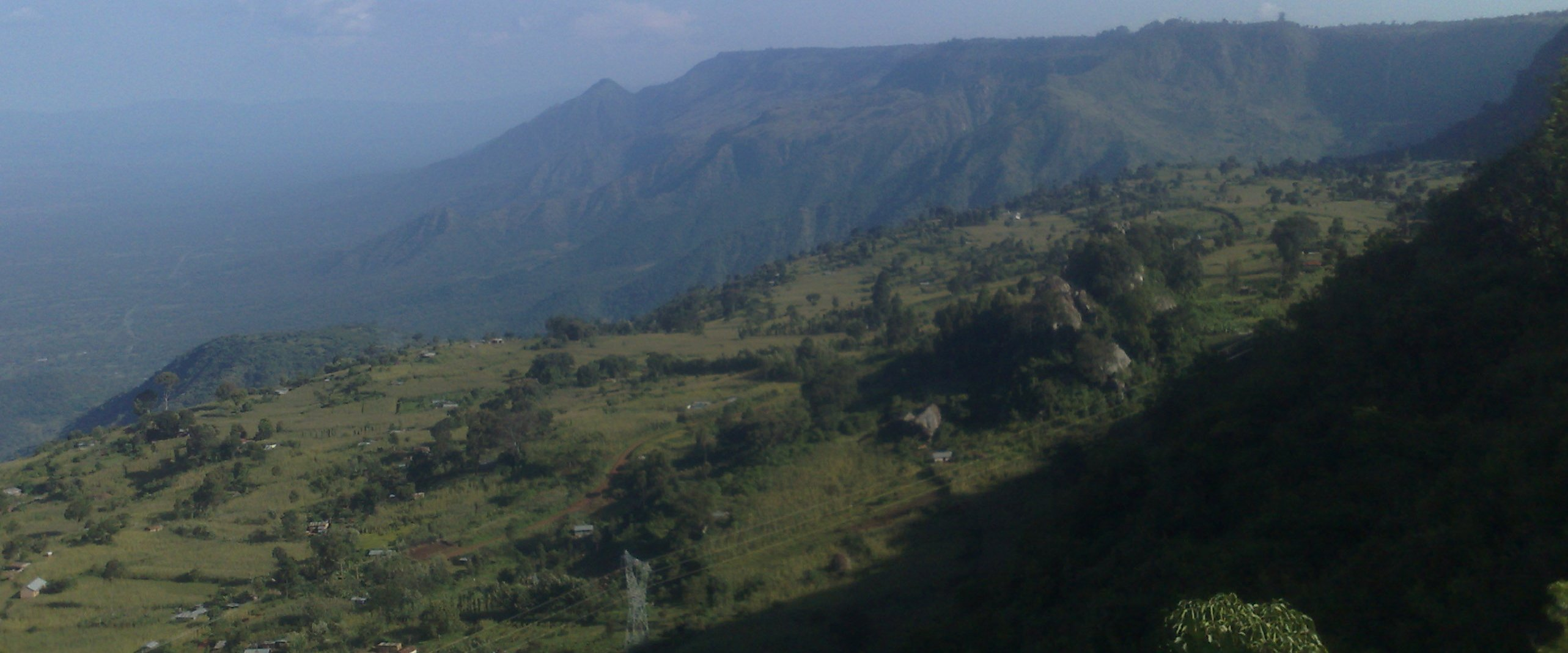
Western cliffs of the Eastern Rift Valley near Iten with step faulting

Volcanic activity started in the central Ethiopian plateau around 30 mya, long before rifting began. The first period of activity deposited flood basalts and rhyolites from 500 metres (1,600 ft) to 2,000 metres (6,600 ft) thick. Uplift of the Ethiopian plateau began around this time or soon after. Between 30 and 10 mya synrift shield volcanoes deposited from 1,000 metres (3,300 ft) to 2,000 metres (6,600 ft) of additional material over the Ethiopian flood basalts. Rifting in Ethiopia began about 18 mya in the southwest and 11 mya in northern parts of the Main Ethiopian Rift as the opening of the Gregory rift caused the Afar triple junction to form. Volcanism from the Middle Pleistocene onward formed a chain of volcanoes along the floor of the rift throughout its length, dividing it into separate valleys.

There are some indications that the lithosphere may have thinned below the Gregory Rift, although based on basalt geochemistry the lithosphere is at least 75 kilometres (47 mi) thick in southern Kenya. The Gregory Rift is oriented north-south, and in the past the minimum horizontal tectonic stress direction was east-west, the direction of extension. The alignment of rows of small vents, cones, domes and collapse pits in the Suswa, Silali and Kinangop Plateau regions support this theory. However, data from oil and gas exploration wells in Kenya, vents in volcanic shields to the east of the rift at Huri Hills, Mount Marsabit, and Nyambeni Hills and recent small cones at Suswa and east of the Silali caldera all indicate that the minimum horizontal stress direction has changed to NW-SE within the last half million years.

== Sources ==
- Anadón, P.; Cabrera, L; Kelts, K. R. (1991). Lacustrine facies analysis. John Wiley & Sons. ISBN 978-0-632-03149-8.
- Beccaluva, Luigi; Bianchini, Gianluca; Wilson, Marjorie (2011). Volcanism and Evolution of the African Lithosphere. Geological Society of America. ISBN 978-0-8137-2478-2.
- Bosworth, W.; Burke, K.; Strecker, M. (2000). M.W. Jessell and J.L.Urai (ed.). "Magma chamber elongation as an indicator of intraplate stress field orientation: "borehole break-out mechanism" and examples from the Late Pleistocene to Recent Kenya Rift Valley. In: Stress, Strain and Structure, A volume in honour of W D. Means". Journal of the Virtual Explorer. 2. doi:10.3809/jvirtex.2000.00008. Archived from the original on 2012-03-28.
- Dawson, John Barry (2008). The Gregory rift valley and Neogene-recent volcanoes of northern Tanzania. Geological Society Memoir No. 33. Geological Society of London. ISBN 978-1-86239-267-0.
- Frisch, Wolfgang; Meschede, Martin (2010). Plate Tectonics. Springer. ISBN 978-3-540-76503-5.
