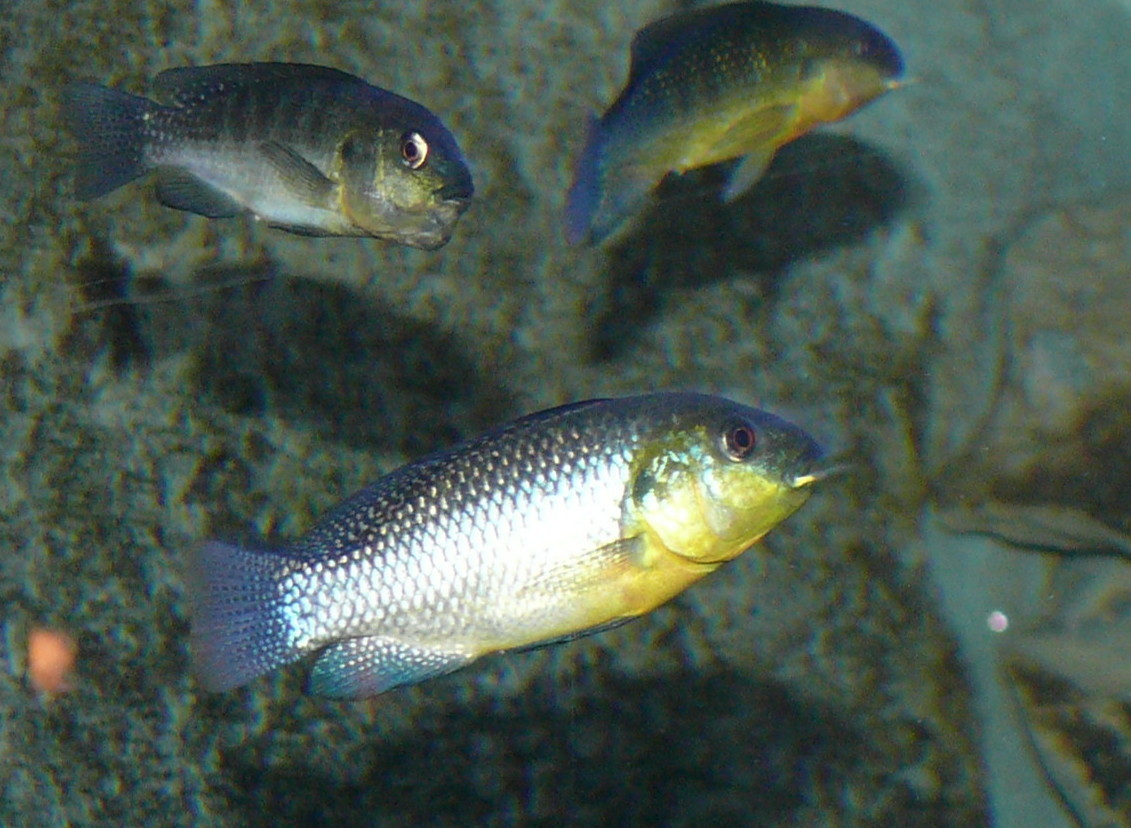
- Alcolapia alcalica

Scientific classification
- Kingdom: Animalia
- Phylum: Chordata
- Class: Actinopterygii
- Order: Cichliformes
- Family: Cichlidae
- Subfamily: Pseudocrenilabrinae
- Tribe: Oreochromini
- Genus: Alcolapia; Thys van den Audenaerde, 1969

Type species
- Tilapia grahami Boulenger, 1912

= Alcolapia =

Genus of fishes

Alcolapia is a genus of small fishes in the family Cichlidae. Their native range is restricted to margins of Lake Natron and Lake Magadi, as well as similar conditions in nearby hot springs, in Kenya and Tanzania. They live in waters that are warm (mostly 30–42.8 °C [86–109 °F], although occasionally down to 20 °C [68 °F]), hypersaline (salinity above 40‰) and alkaline (pH above 10). Species from this genus have also been introduced to Lake Nakuru and Lake Elmenteita. They are the only fish in their range.

The different Alcolapia species differ primarily in the position of their mouth (straight, upturned or downturned) and the colors of the adult males. They are fairly small fish, with the largest species reaching up to 20 cm (7.9 in) in standard length. They mostly feed on algae and cyanobacteria, but also take other plant material, fish eggs, fry and remains, and insects in smaller quantities (except A. alcalica, which feed on other plant material at about the same level as algae and cyanobacteria). They are maternal mouthbrooders.

== Taxonomy ==
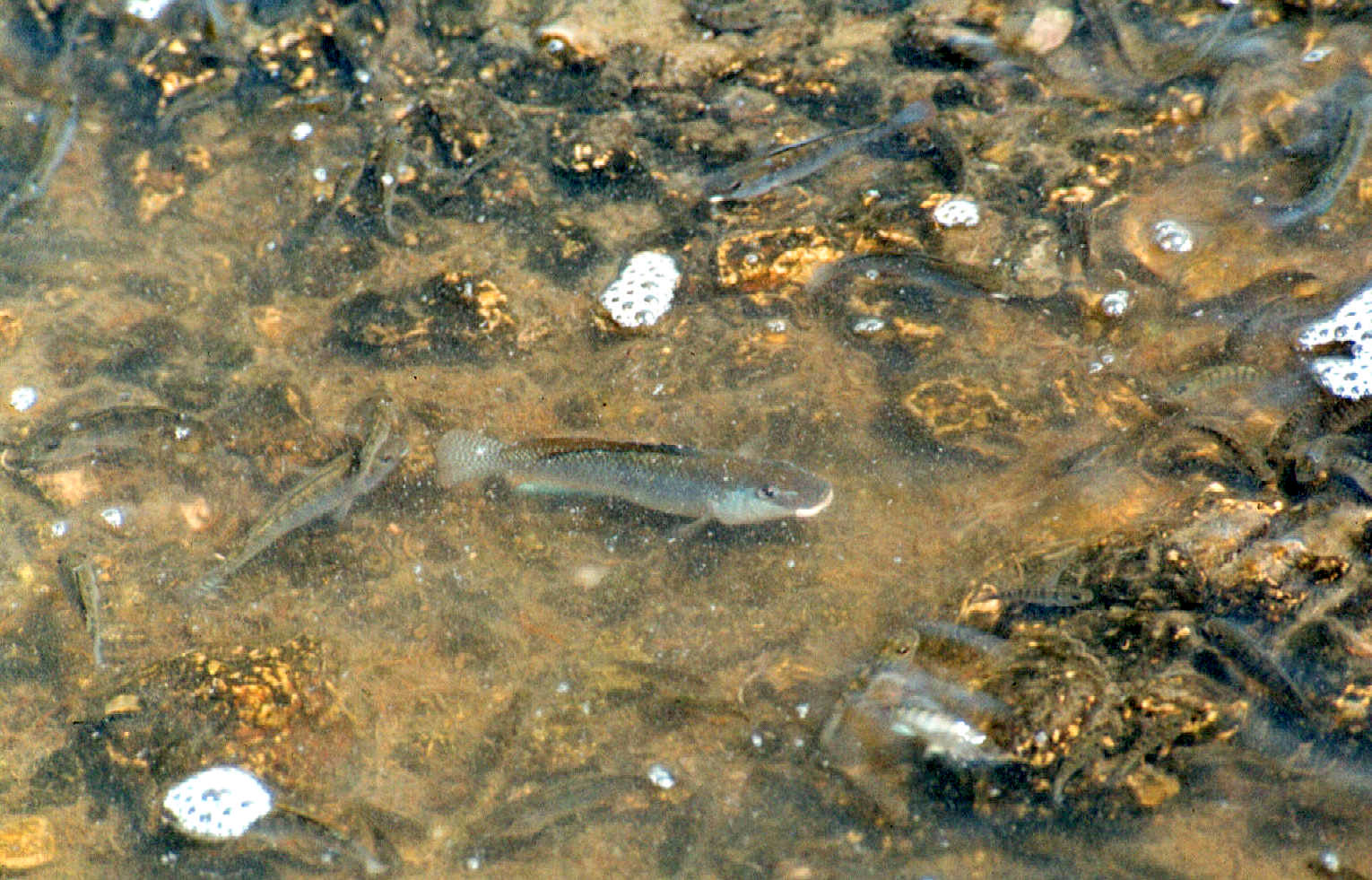
A. grahami in its native habitat in Lake Magadi; the other species are native to Lake Natron

Alcolapia was first included in Tilapia, then moved to Oreochromis and finally to their own genus. Nevertheless, the genus is very closely related to Oreochromis, and O. amphimelas and O. esculentus appear to be closer to Alcolapia than they are to other Oreochromis species. Similar to Alcolapia, O. amphimelas inhabits Tanzanian lakes that can be highly alcaline and saline. A potential solution is to merge Alcolapia into Oreochromis, as done by Catalog of Fishes.

=== Species ===
There are currently four recognized species in this genus:

- Alcolapia alcalica (Hilgendorf, 1905) (Magadi tilapia)
- Alcolapia grahami (Boulenger, 1912)
- Alcolapia latilabris (Seegers & Tichy, 1999)
- Alcolapia ndalalani (Seegers & Tichy, 1999)

== See also ==
- Danakilia – another cichlid genus from warm, saline lakes in Africa.
