= Ol Doinyo Eburru =

Active complex of volcanoes in Kenya, East Africa

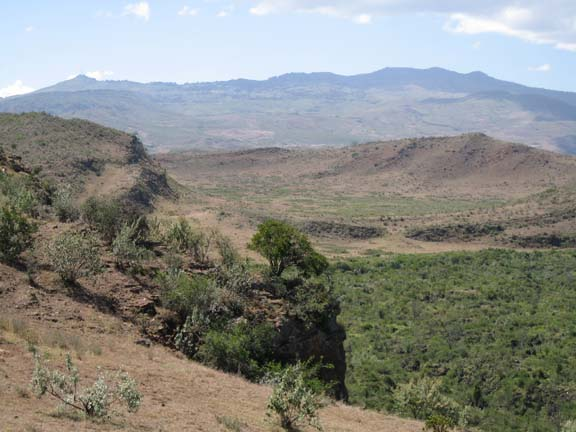
- Looking south over the Elmenteita Badlands to Eburru in the background.

Highest point
- Elevation: 2,856 m (9,370 ft)
- Coordinates: 0°38′56″S 36°11′14″E

Geography
- Location within Kenya
- Location: Kenya

Geology
- Formed by: Volcanism along the Gregory Rift

Ol Doinyo Eburru is an active complex of volcanoes in the Great Rift Valley, Kenya to the northwest of Lake Naivasha. It is being exploited for geothermal energy. Soysambu Conservancy is located to the north of the massif, between Lake Elmenteita to the east and Lake Nakuru to the west.

== Geology ==
Eburru is part of a group of volcanoes in the rift that also includes Suswa, Longonot, Olkaria, Elmenteita and Menengai. It is separated from Olkaria volcano to the south by the Akira plains. In this part of the rift, the eastern margin is covered by trachytic tuffs, often ignimbritic, and some trachytic lavas. The western margin is covered by trachytic and pantelleritic pumice as well as deposits of ash falls ejected from Eburru.

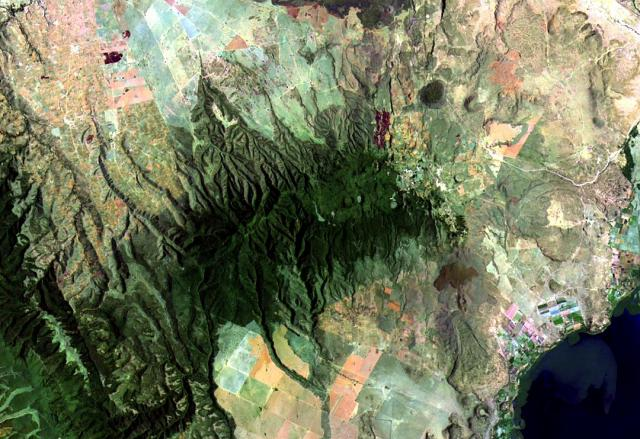
Landsat image of Eburru. Lake Naivasha in lower right. Lava flows of the Elmenteita Badlands at the top-center

The Eburru massif rises to 980 metres (3,220 ft) above the floor of the rift. It developed in three stages. The products of the first stage, in the west, are now mostly buried apart from small pantelleritic lava outcrops. The second stage formed the 19.5 kilometres (12.1 mi) Waterloo Ridge on the eastern side of the massif. These rocks came from a series of pyroclastic eruptions originating in a fault zone. The third stage created craters, small cones, domes and lava flows. The summit has more than fifty craters with diameters from 200 metres (660 ft) to 1.25 kilometres (4,100 ft). The pumice lapilli and ash beds from these centers covers most of the massif as well as the western shoulder of the rift. The youngest formations are no more than a few hundred years old.

The Eburru massif today is ridge-shaped and eroded, with an east–west orientation. The volcanic complex has an area of 470 square kilometres (180 sq mi). There are two summits, Eburru hill and West hill. There are young craters on the eastern part of the ridge. The east flank has rhyolitic domes that were probably created in the Holocene and are still only partly overgrown with vegetation. There are widespread fumaroles in cinder cones and craters along the faults in the massif.

== Geothermal development ==
In October 2009 Geothermal Development Associates announced that they had signed a contract with Kenya Electricity Generating Company Limited to design, supply and commission a wellhead geothermal power plant at Eburru. The plant would include a 2.5 MW steam turbine generator manufactured by Elliott Turbomachinery in Jeannette, Pennsylvania. It has been estimated that Eburru could support a 20 MW geothermal power station.

== Sources ==
- Richter, L.X. (September 9, 2010). "GEOTHERMAL DEVELOPMENT ASSOCIATES SIGN CONTRACT ON EBURRU WITH KENGEN". Archived from the original on 2012-06-08.
- Seach, John (2011). "Ol Doinyo Eburru Volcano". Volcano Live.
- "Ol Doinyo Eburru". Smithsonian. 1999.
- "Welcome to Soysambu Conservancy". Soysambu Conservancy.
- Woolley, Alan Robert (2001). Alkaline rocks and carbonatites of the world, Part 3. Geological Society. ISBN 1-86239-083-5.
