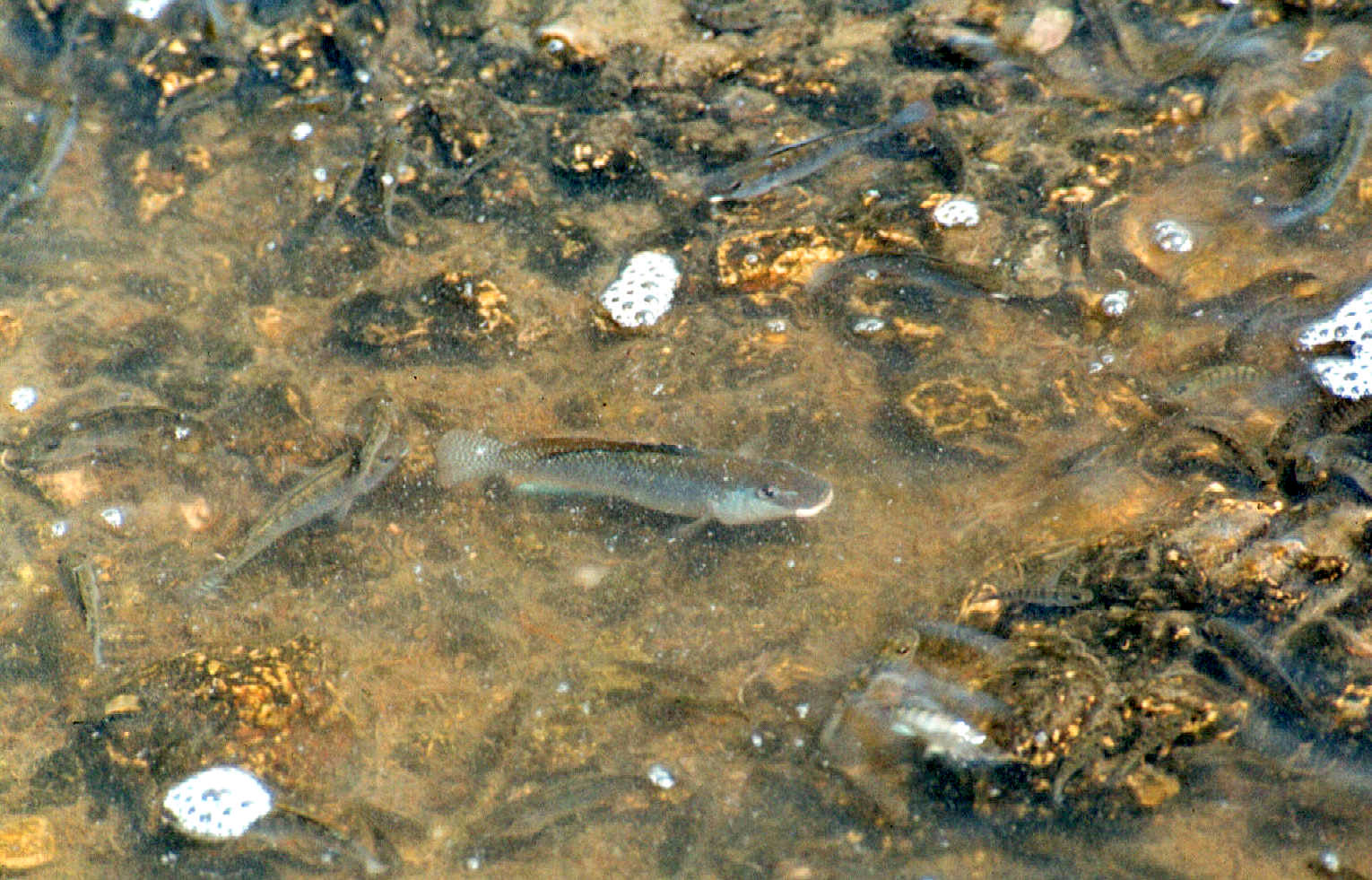
- Alcolapia grahami in lake Magadi hotsprings, Kenya, 1980s

Conservation status
- Vulnerable (IUCN 3.1)

Scientific classification
- Kingdom: Animalia
- Phylum: Chordata
- Class: Actinopterygii
- Division: Teleostei
- Order: Cichliformes
- Family: Cichlidae
- Genus: Alcolapia
- Species: A. grahami

Binomial name
- Alcolapia grahami (Boulenger, 1912)

Synonyms
- Tilapia grahami Boulenger, 1912; Oreochromis grahami (Boulenger, 1912)

= Alcolapia grahami =

Species of fish

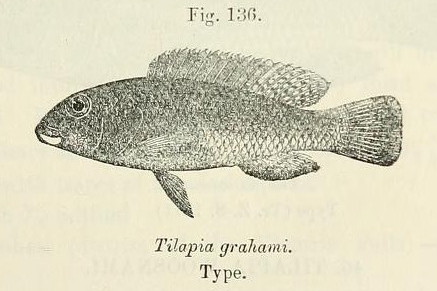
Alcolapia grahami

Alcolapia grahami, the Lake Magadi tilapia or Graham's cichlid, is a vulnerable species of fish in the family Cichlidae. It is specialised to live in hot, alkaline waters in springs and lagoons around hypersaline lakes.

== Description ==
Alcolapia grahami is sexually dimorphic, the mature females are golden in colour while the males have pale blue flanks. In the mature males the sides of the mouth have swollen, brilliant white patches and blue iridescent spots on their scales. The males' genital papillae are obvious, conical in shape and bright yellow, those of the females are swollen. The breeding male has a very dark, black bar through its eyes and this is duller in females.

== Distribution ==
It is endemic to the hypersaline, warm and highly alkaline Lake Magadi in Kenya where it is the only fish. It has also been introduced to Lake Elmenteita and Lake Nakuru in Kenya, and Lake Natron in Tanzania, although it does not appear to have become established in Natron.

== Habitat and ecology ==
Alcolapia grahami is found in the springs and lagoons around the margin of the lake. Its habitat is one which is normally unfavourable to fishes due to environmental conditions such as water temperature and chemical composition. They are active feeders in the evenings and their main food sources are blue green algae, copepods and the larvae of Diptera, the invertebrates being taken from the surface. The young of this species consume the eggs as the female lays them which means that the territorial male spends much of his time and energy trying to drive these young fish out of the breeding site.

They form pairs which last for a single breeding cycle. The male excavates a pit in the substrate for breeding, the structure of the pit is variable depending on the type of substrate. Breeding behaviour is more frequent and active in the mornings. The female sheds around 3-10 eggs at each breeding event, and immediately gathers them into her mouth then the male swims so that his genital papilla are near to the female's mouth, likely emitting milt. The female broods the eggs and fry for a reported period of 12–16 days.

=== Physiology ===
The fish is obligately ureotelic (urea excreting), unlike most teleosts which produce ammonia. The reason for this appears to be due to the difficulty of diffusing ammonia into a highly alkaline environment, not pH regulation as previously thought. Efficient nitrogen excretion is particularly crucial as the fish feeds on cyanobacteria which have a very high nitrogen content. Urea is also used in a small way, but significantly, in osmoregulation. Due to the salinity of the lake, A. grahami has an unusually high osmolarity of around 580 mosm, about half that of seawater. For comparison, most marine teleosts have an osmolarity of only around a third of seawater. Sodium chloride is the main contributor to this osmolarity, though around three times as much sodium than chloride ions are present.

A. grahami has been shown to be able to tolerate temperatures of 42 °C and has been observed in 38 °C water naturally. At high temperatures, the solubility of oxygen in water decreases. Owing to a very high rate of urea production, and the elevated metabolic rate this causes, this is a particularly significant problem for the fish. During such times, they have been observed to gulp air to increase their oxygen intake.

=== Parasitology ===
Although A. grahami lives in a very hostile environment, at least one species of parasite has managed to resist the same conditions, the Monogenea Gyrodactylus magadiensis Dos Santos, Ndegwa Maina & Avenant-Oldewage, 2019. This parasite lives on the gills of the fish and thus is in direct contact with the water of the lake.

== Etymology ==
The generic name is a compound of alco referring to the alkaline habitat of the fishes in this genus and lapia, as the genus was originally named as a subgenus of Tilapia. The specific name honours the person who collected the type, J.W. Graham, but in his description Boulenger gives no other information about Mr Graham.
