= Mawe Mbili =

Volcanic rock formation in southern Kenya

Mawe Mbili is a volcanic rock formation on the northern edge of the Elmenteita Badlands and within the Soysambu Conservancy, in Nakuru County of Rift Valley Province, southern Kenya. The rock formation is located at the base of Scout Hat Hill, about 5 kilometres (3.1 mi) south of Lake Elmenteita and northwest of Nairobi.

In Swahili the name Mawe Mbili means 2 stones, referring to two lava ash monoliths, about 2 metres (6.6 ft) in height, which rise from a small grassland clearing in the lava badlands. The Elmenteita Badlands are a Holocene Epoch volcanic lava flow. One of the stones has a cavity at the base of it, large enough to sit in and used in times past as a shelter in bad weather for herdsmen looking after cattle in the area.

The monoliths are in a natural clearing in the lleleshwa (Tarchonanthus camphoratus) shrublands. In the area there are occasional Elephant's toothbrush (Cussonia spicata) and Fig trees (Ficus spp.).

== Features ==
The Sleeping Warrior Eco Lodge stands high on Mawe Mbili.

Nearby there is a hot water borehole and a Japanese style hot bathing facility.

The route of the 2007, 2008, and 2009 Safari rally passed through the clearing outside the preserve, as it led from the boundary of the Elmenteita Badlands and Delamere Estates on Soysambu Ranch, around the back of Scout Hat Hill, and past a helicopter landing marker built by the British forces in 1955 during the Mau Mau rebellion.
