= Streptomyces alkaliphilus =

Scientific classification
- Domain: Bacteria
- Kingdom: Bacillati
- Phylum: Actinomycetota
- Class: Actinomycetia
- Order: Streptomycetales
- Family: Streptomycetaceae
- Genus: Streptomyces
- Species: S. alkaliphilus

Binomial name
- Streptomyces alkaliphilus Akhwale et al. 2015

Type strain
- CECT 8549, DSM 42118, strain No. 7

Species of bacterium

Streptomyces alkaliphilus is a bacterium species from the genus Streptomyces which has been isolated from sediments from the Lake Elmenteita from the Kenyan Rift Valley in Kenya.

== See also ==
- List of Streptomyces species
