= Elmenteita Badlands =

Lava flow in Kenya

Elementeita Badlands
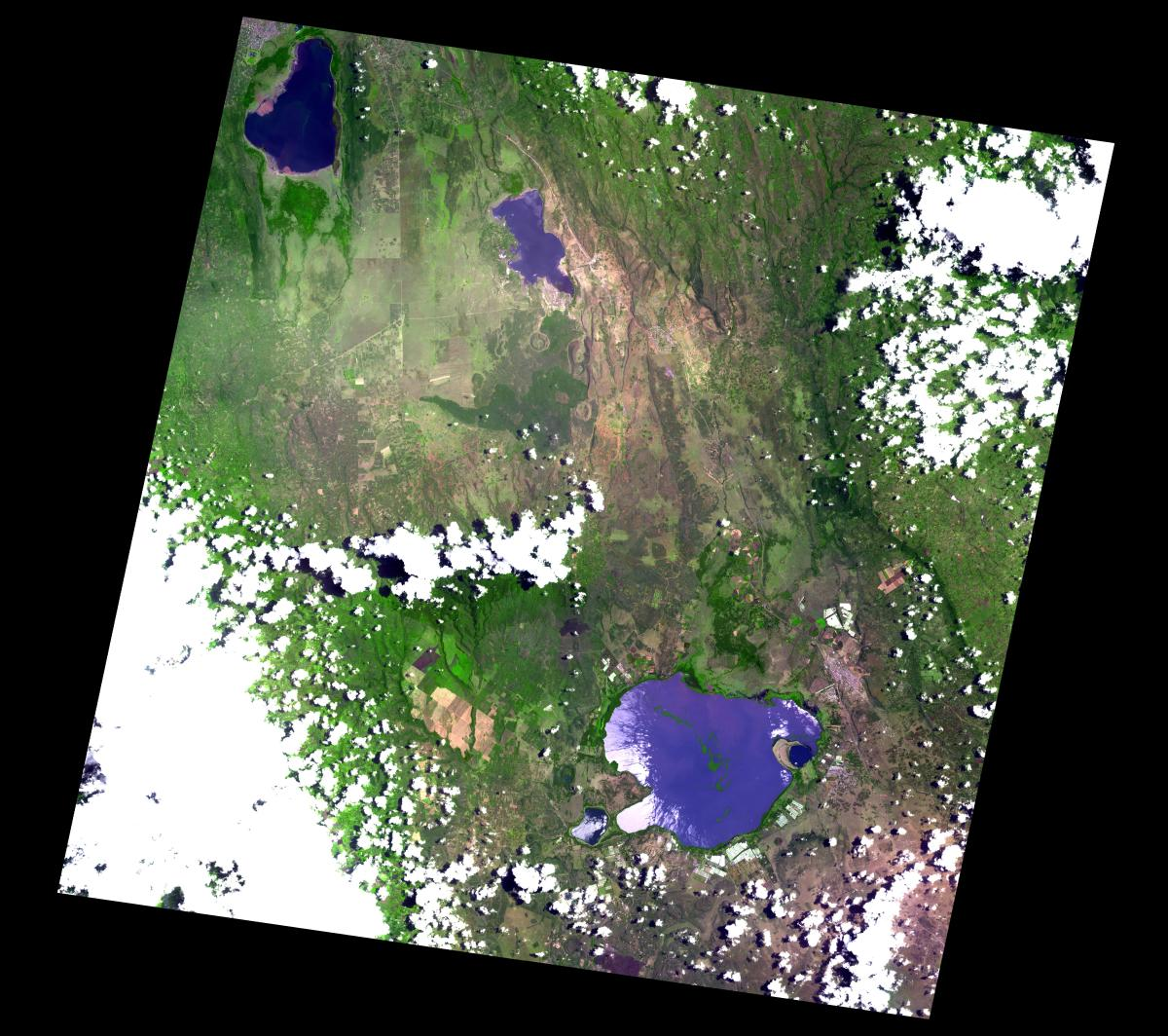
- Satellite image of the surrounding area from the ASTER Volcano Archive

Highest point
- Elevation: 2,126 m (6,975 ft)
- Coordinates: 0°31′S 36°16′E

Geography
- Location within Kenya
- Location: Kenya

Geology
- Mountain type: Pyroclastic cone
- Last eruption: Unknown

The Elementeita Badlands, also known as the Otutu Forest or Ututu Forest, is a lava flow in Kenya that covers approximately 36 square kilometres (9,000 acres). The area was previously covered in thick dryland forest characterized by cedar trees, (Juniperus spp.), and Leleshwa bushes (Tarchonanthus camphoratus). In addition, Wild Jasmine and Boophone are also found.

The land was owned by Njenga Karume, who bought it from Arthur Cole in 1980. Cole had bought it from Digby Tatham-Warter (famous for his role in the Battle of Arnhem) in 1968, as grazing land of low potential. The land is unsuitable for either small scale cultivation or cattle ranching as it is covered in thick bush growing from the profusion of lava boulders. It is now owned by the Njenga Karume Trust.

== Geography ==
The land is punctuated by pyroclastic cones of Holocene age. The highest peak has an elevation of 2126 metres. It is located between Lake Elmenteita and Ol Doinyo Eburru volcano, on the southern boundary of the Soysambu Conservancy. Some of the prominent peaks include "Horseshoe Crater" and "Scout Hat Hill". There are some lava tubes which show evidence of prehistoric occupation as grinding plates and stone bowls have been recovered by the local people in rudimentary excavation. These caves have been occupied by some of the refugees from the 2008 post-election violence in Kenya.

== People in the Elmenteita Badlands ==
The area was heavily degraded from the 1980s onwards, being a hideout for disaffected and disenfranchised people who have resorted to charcoal burning, poaching and changaa brewing. A trading centre has been built at the northeastern corner known as "Soko Mjinga" (Fool's Market) which is the place to trade in these items.

The living conditions in the Otutu forest have led to an outbreak of leishmaniasis or Aleppo boil which is spread by sandflies and rock hyrax, which are numerous there. The only sources of water are from some small steam vents beside the old railway line along the eastern boundary of the forest (currently a road), which ran between Elmenteita and Gilgil before it was realigned in 1945. The Eburru station (now defunct) is on the edge of the Otutu and is notable for the steam condensers made from oil drums and corrugated iron sheets which the residents construct for their water source.

A luxury tourist lodge, called Mawe Mbili Lodge, is currently under construction on the western boundary of the forest, on the slopes of "Scout Hat Hill", so called because the shape resembles Baden Powell's hat. It is projected to open in March 2009. The water supply is from rainwater caught from plastic sheeting and from a deep and alkaline borehole which provides water at over 50 degrees Celsius and a pH of nearly 8.

== Gallery ==
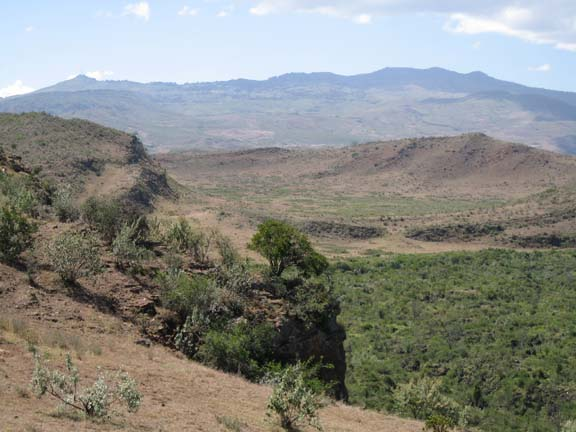
Looking south over the Badlands to Eburru in the background

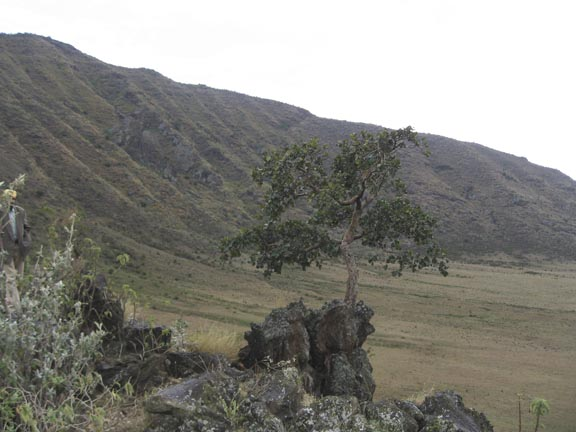
The northern rim of Horseshoe Crater

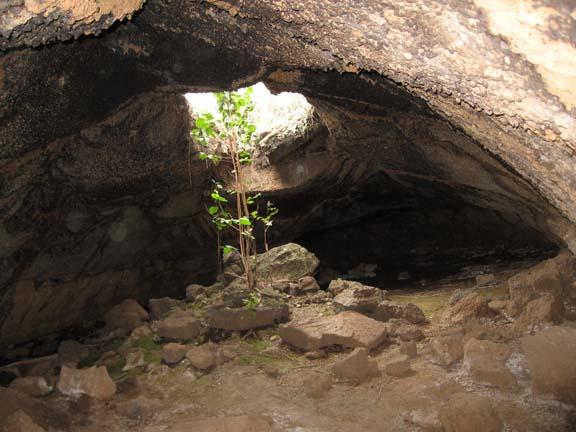
A lava tube in the Ututu
