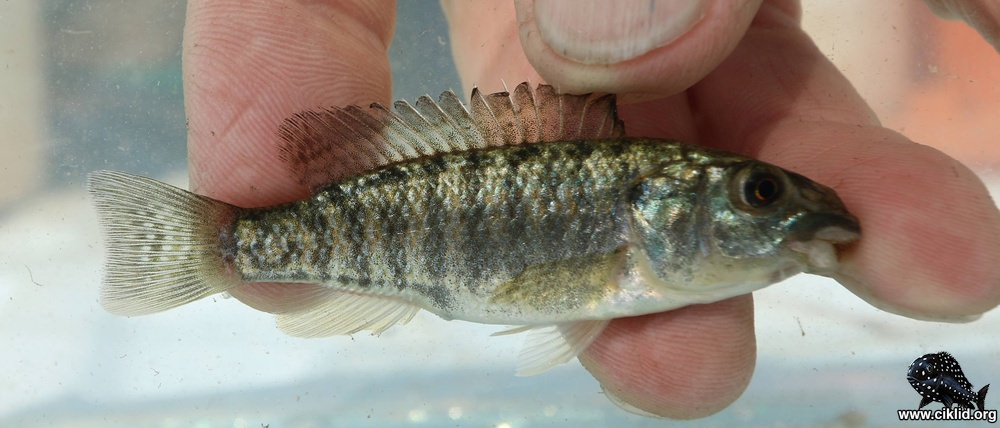

Conservation status
- Vulnerable (IUCN 3.1)

Scientific classification
- Kingdom: Animalia
- Phylum: Chordata
- Class: Actinopterygii
- Order: Cichliformes
- Family: Cichlidae
- Genus: Alcolapia
- Species: A. latilabris

Binomial name
- Alcolapia latilabris (Seegers & Tichy, 1999)

Synonyms
- Oreochromis latilabris Seegers & Tichy, 1999

= Alcolapia latilabris =

Species of fish

Alcolapia latilabris, the wide-lipped Natron tilapia, is a species of small fish in the family Cichlidae. It is endemic to the hypersaline, warm Lake Natron in Tanzania. It lives near springs in the southern part of the lake. It reaches up to 6.2 cm (2.4 in) in standard length. It has a relatively broad, downturned mouth, which separates it from the two other fish in Lake Natron, A. alcalica and A. ndalalani.
