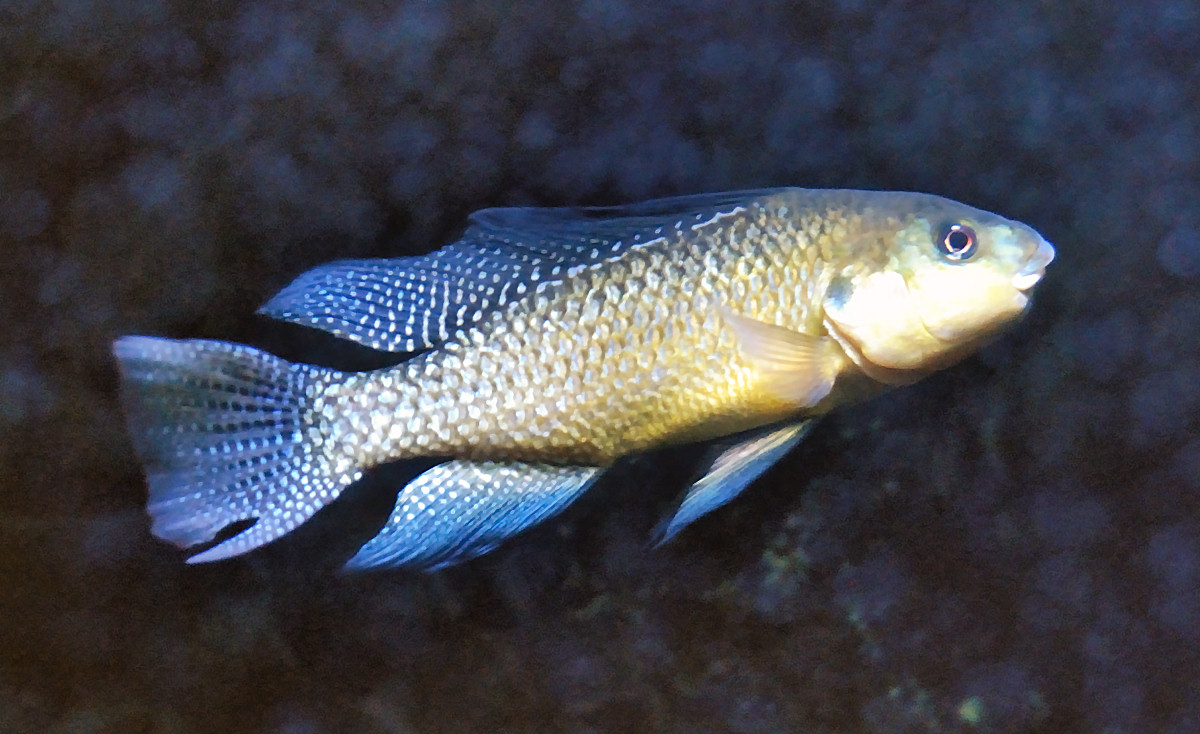
- Territorial male

Conservation status
- Endangered (IUCN 3.1)

Scientific classification
- Kingdom: Animalia
- Phylum: Chordata
- Class: Actinopterygii
- Division: Teleostei
- Order: Cichliformes
- Family: Cichlidae
- Genus: Alcolapia
- Species: A. alcalica

Binomial name
- Alcolapia alcalica (Hilgendorf, 1905)

Synonyms
- Tilapia alcalica Hilgendorf, 1905; Oreochromis alcalicus (Hilgendorf, 1905)

= Alcolapia alcalica =

Species of fish

Alcolapia alcalica, the common natron tilapia or soda cichlid, is an endangered species of fish in the family Cichlidae. It is endemic to the hypersaline, warm Lake Natron in Ngorongoro District of Arusha Region, its drainage and the Shombole Swamps in Kenya and Tanzania. This species typically has an essentially terminal (straight) mouth, but a morph with an upturned mouth is found locally in eastern Lake Natron, where it co-occurs with the normal morph. A. latilabris and A. ndalalani, the two other species in Lake Natron, both have a clearly downturned mouth. Territorial males of A. alcalica have extensive blue-white spotting, and their underparts and throat can be yellow or white. Females and non-territorial males are overall sandy in colour. A. alcalica reaches up to 11.6 cm (4.6 in) in total length.
