= List of World Heritage Sites in Kenya =

Location of World Heritage Sites in Kenya. Red dots represent cultural sites, green dots represent natural sites

The United Nations Educational, Scientific and Cultural Organization (UNESCO) World Heritage Sites are places of importance to cultural or natural heritage as described in the UNESCO World Heritage Convention, established in 1972. Cultural heritage consists of monuments (such as architectural works, monumental sculptures, or inscriptions), groups of buildings, and sites (including archaeological sites). Natural heritage consists of natural features (physical and biological formations), geological and physiographical formations (including habitats of threatened species of animals and plants), and natural sites which are important from the point of view of science, conservation, or natural beauty. Kenya accepted the convention on 10 July 1997, making its historical sites eligible for inclusion on the list. As of 2024, there are eight World Heritage Sites in Kenya.

== World Heritage Sites ==
UNESCO lists sites under ten criteria; each entry must meet at least one of the criteria. Criteria i through vi are cultural, and vii through x are natural.

† In danger

World Heritage Sites
Site	Image	Location (county)	UNESCO data	Year listed	Description
Fort Jesus, Mombasa	A fortified, but badly-faded yellow-coloured wall looks off into distant sea to the left.	Mombasa	1295rev; ii, iv (cultural)	2011	The late 16th century Portuguese fort was built to control the European trade routes in the Indian Ocean. It changed hands several times, coming under control of Arabs, Swahili people, and the British Empire. The fort with five bastions and extensive walls follows the Renaissance ideas of architectural proportions and geometric harmony. The layout has remained mostly unchanged to present day.
Kenya Lake System in the Great Rift Valley	An aerial view of a large, grassy plain by the water. A small road zigzags through the field.	Rift Valley Province	1060rev; vii, ix, x (natural)	2011	Located in the Great Rift Valley, Kenya, the site features three lakes: Lake Bogoria, Lake Nakuru and Lake Elementaita. A highly diverse population of birds, including thirteen threatened species, frequent the area.
Lake Turkana National Parks†	A view of a wide river separating two landmasses, on the left and right.	Lake Turkana	801bis; viii, x (natural)	1997	Turkana, as Africa's largest saline lake, is an important area for the study of fauna and flora. It is a breeding ground for the Nile crocodile, hippopotamus and several venomous snakes. The site was placed the List of World Heritage in Danger in 2018, primarily due to the potential impact of Ethiopia's Gilgel Gibe III Dam.
Lamu Old Town	An aerial view of a path (that doubles as a wharf) along the coast of a large body of water.	Lamu	1055; ii, iv, vi (cultural)	2001	The town is the oldest Swahili settlement, and is built in coral stone and mangrove timber. It features inner courtyards, verandas, and elaborate wooden doors.
Mount Kenya National Park/Natural Forest	A view of a very slanted and lengthy hill leading to a very foggy top.	Central Province and Eastern Province	800bis; vii, ix (natural)	1997	The park surrounds the 5,199 m (17,057 ft) Mount Kenya and features twelve glaciers.
Sacred Mijikenda Kaya Forests	Two women discuss beside two very long tree roots in a forest.	Coast Province	1231rev; iii, v, vi (cultural)	2008	The site comprises eleven forests spread 200 km (120 mi) along the coast of Kenya. They hold the remains of villages built during the 16th century by the Mijikenda, and are now considered sacred sites.
Thimlich Ohinga Archaeological Site	A picture of a stone wall with a gate.	Migori County	1450rev; iii, iv, v (cultural)	2018	Dating back to the 16th century CE, the dry-stone walled settlement is the largest and best preserved traditional enclosures of its kind.
The Historic Town and Archaeological Site of Gedi	The palace at Gedi	Kilifi County	1720; ii, iii, iv (cultural)	2024	Surrounded by a remnant coastal forest, away from the coastline, the abandoned city of Gedi was one of the most important Swahili cities on the East African coast from the 10th to 17th centuries.

== Tentative list ==
In addition to sites inscribed on the World Heritage List, member states can maintain a list of tentative sites that they may consider for nomination. Nominations for the World Heritage List are only accepted if the site was previously listed on the tentative list. Kenya lists 21 properties on its tentative list.

Tentative sites
Site	Image	Location (county)	Year listed	UNESCO criteria	Description
The Tana Delta and Forests Complex		Tana River County	2010	ix, x (natural)	
Amboseli National Park		Kajiado County	2023	vii, viii, ix (natural)	
Coastal Forests of Kenya (Arabuko Sokoke Forest and Shimba Hills National Reserve)		Kilifi County, Kwale County	2023	ix, x (natural)	
Eastern Arc Mountains, Kenya		Taita Taveta County	2023	vii, x (natural)	
Hell's Gate National Park		Nakuru County	2023	viii (natural)	
Kakamega Forest		Kakamega County, Nandi County	2023	vii, ix, x (natural)	
Kilifi Caves (Panga Ya Saidi, Mawe Meru and Chasimba Caves)		Kilifi County	2023	ii, ii, iv, vi (cultural)	
The Marakwet Escarpment Furrow Irrigation System		Elgeyo-Marakwet County	2023	ii, iv, v (cultural)	
Maasai Mara Game Reserve		Narok County	2023	vii, ix (natural)	
Meru Conservation Area		Meru County	2023	ix, x (natural)	
Mfangano Island Rock Art Sites		Homa Bay County	2023	iii, iv (cultural)	
Mt. Marsabit National Park and Reserve		Marsabit County	2023	x (natural)	
Mt Kulal Biosphere Reserve		Marsabit County	2023	vii, ix, x (natural)	
Nyandarua Mountains		Kiambu County, Murang'a County, Nyandarua County, Nyeri County	2023	vii, ix, x (natural)	
Olorgesailie Prehistoric Site		Kajiado County	2023	iii, viii (mixed)	
The Stone Pillar Sites of Turkana Basin		Turkana County	2023	iv, v (cultural)	
Geometric rock art in Lake Victoria Region of Kenya, Tanzania, and Uganda		Busia County, Homa Bay County	2024	iii, vi (cultural)	

== See also ==
- List of Intangible Cultural Heritage elements in Kenya
