= Lake Nshenyi =

Lake in Uganda

Coordinates: 0°09′00″S 30°09′36″E

Lake Nshenyi is a Ugandan crater lake in Western Uganda, Rubirizi district. The lake's elevation above sea level is 1006 metres. The lake is a habitat to Flamingos that migrated from Lake Nakuru in Kenya.
