= List of Intangible Cultural Heritage elements in Kenya =

The United Nations Educational, Scientific and Cultural Organisation (UNESCO) intangible cultural heritage elements are the non-physical traditions and practices performed by a people. As part of a country's cultural heritage, they include celebrations, festivals, performances, oral traditions, music, and the making of handicrafts. The "intangible cultural heritage" is defined by the Convention for the Safeguarding of Intangible Cultural Heritage, drafted in 2003 and took effect in 2006. Inscription of new heritage elements on the UNESCO Intangible Cultural Heritage Lists is determined by the Intergovernmental Committee for the Safeguarding of Intangible Cultural Heritage, an organisation established by the convention.

Kenya signed the convention on 24 October 2007.

== Intangible Cultural Heritage of Humanity ==
+ Transnational element

=== Good Safeguarding Practices ===
Name	Year	No.	Description
Success story of promoting traditional foods and safeguarding traditional foodways in Kenya	2021	01409	

=== Elements in Need of Urgent Safeguarding ===
Name	Year	No.	Description
Traditions and practices associated with the Kayas in the sacred forests of the Mijikenda	2009	00313	The identity of the Mijikenda peoples is expressed through oral traditions and practices related to their sacred forests.
Isukuti dance of Isukha and Idakho communities of Western Kenya	2014	00981	The Isukuti dance is a traditional celebration of the Isukha and Idakho communities.
Enkipaata, Eunoto and Olng'esherr, three male rites of passage of the Maasai community	2018	01390	Enkipaata, Eunoto and Olng'esherr are three male rites of passage of the Maasai people.
Rituals and practices associated with Kit Mikayi shrine	2019	01489	Rituals and practices of the Luo people.
Mwazindika spiritual dance of the Daida community of Kenya	2025	02297	Spiritual dance of the Daida community that combines dance, music, and storytelling.

== See also ==
- List of World Heritage Sites in Kenya
