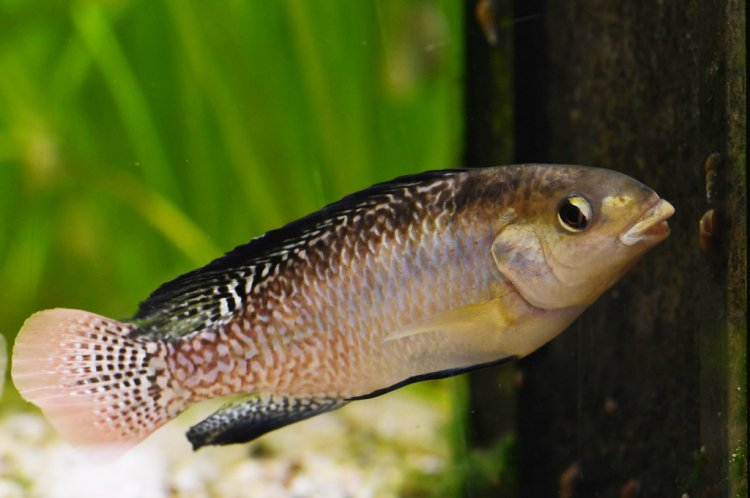

Scientific classification
- Kingdom: Animalia
- Phylum: Chordata
- Class: Actinopterygii
- Order: Cichliformes
- Family: Cichlidae
- Genus: Alcolapia
- Species: A. ndalalani

Binomial name
- Alcolapia ndalalani (Seegers & Tichy, 1999)

Synonyms
- Oreochromis ndalalani Seegers and Tichy, 1999

= Alcolapia ndalalani =

Species of fish

Alcolapia ndalalani, the narrow-mouthed Natron tilapia, is a species of small fish in the family Cichlidae. It is endemic to the hypersaline, warm Lake Natron in Tanzania. Here it lives in creeks and springs at the southern shores of the lake. It reaches up to 5 cm (2.0 in) in standard length. It has a relatively narrow, downturned mouth, which separates it from the two other fish in Lake Natron, A. alcalica and A. latilabris.
