= Magadiite =

Phyllosilicate mineral

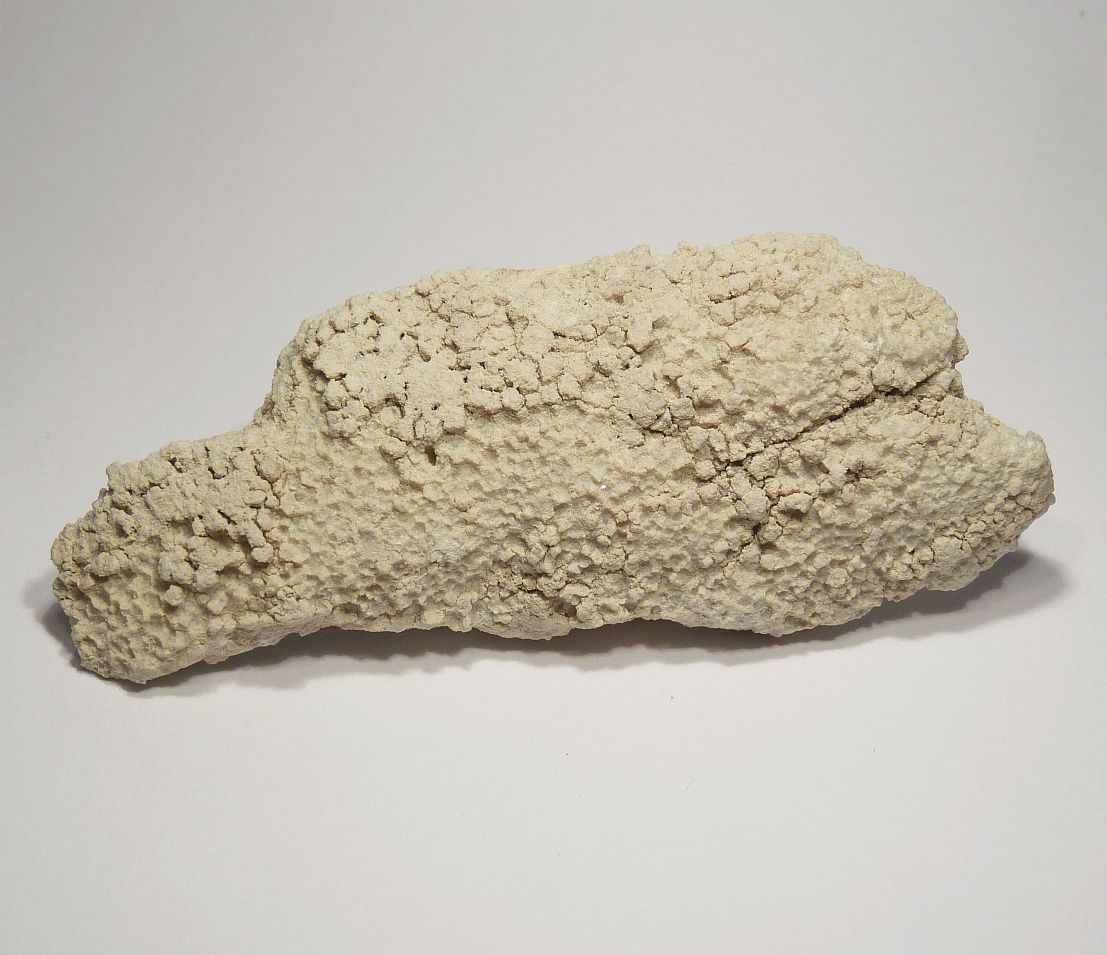
- Magadiite. Collected in 1990 from Lake Magadi, Kajiado County, Kenya.

General
- Category: Phyllosilicate minerals
- Formula: NaSi_{7}O_{13}(OH)_{3}·4(H_{2}O)
- IMA symbol: Mgd
- Strunz classification: 9.EA.20
- Crystal system: Monoclinic; Unknown space group
- Space group: C2/m (no. 12)
- Unit cell: a = 7.22 Å, b = 15.70 Å, c = 6.91 Å; β = 97.27°; Z=1

Identification
- Color: White
- Crystal habit: Minute platy crystals; spherulitic aggregates; powdery
- Tenacity: Puttylike
- Mohs scale hardness: 2
- Luster: Vitreous - dull
- Streak: White
- Diaphaneity: Translucent to opaque
- Specific gravity: 2.25 calculated
- Optical properties: Biaxial
- Refractive index: n_{α} = 1.470
- Ultraviolet fluorescence: Yellow-white under both long and short wave

Magadiite is a hydrous sodium silicate mineral (NaSi_{7}O_{13}(OH)_{3}·4(H_{2}O)) which precipitates from alkali brines as an evaporite phase. It forms as soft (Mohs hardness of 2) white powdery monoclinic crystal masses. The mineral is unstable and decomposes during diagenesis leaving a distinctive variety of chert (Magadi-type chert).

The mineral was first described by Hans P. Eugster in 1967 for an occurrence in Lake Magadi, Kenya, and is also found at Olduvai Gorge, Tanzania. It is also reported from alkalic intrusive syenites as in Mont Saint-Hilaire, Canada.
