= Mount Kenya National Park =

National park in Kenya

- IUCN category II (national park)
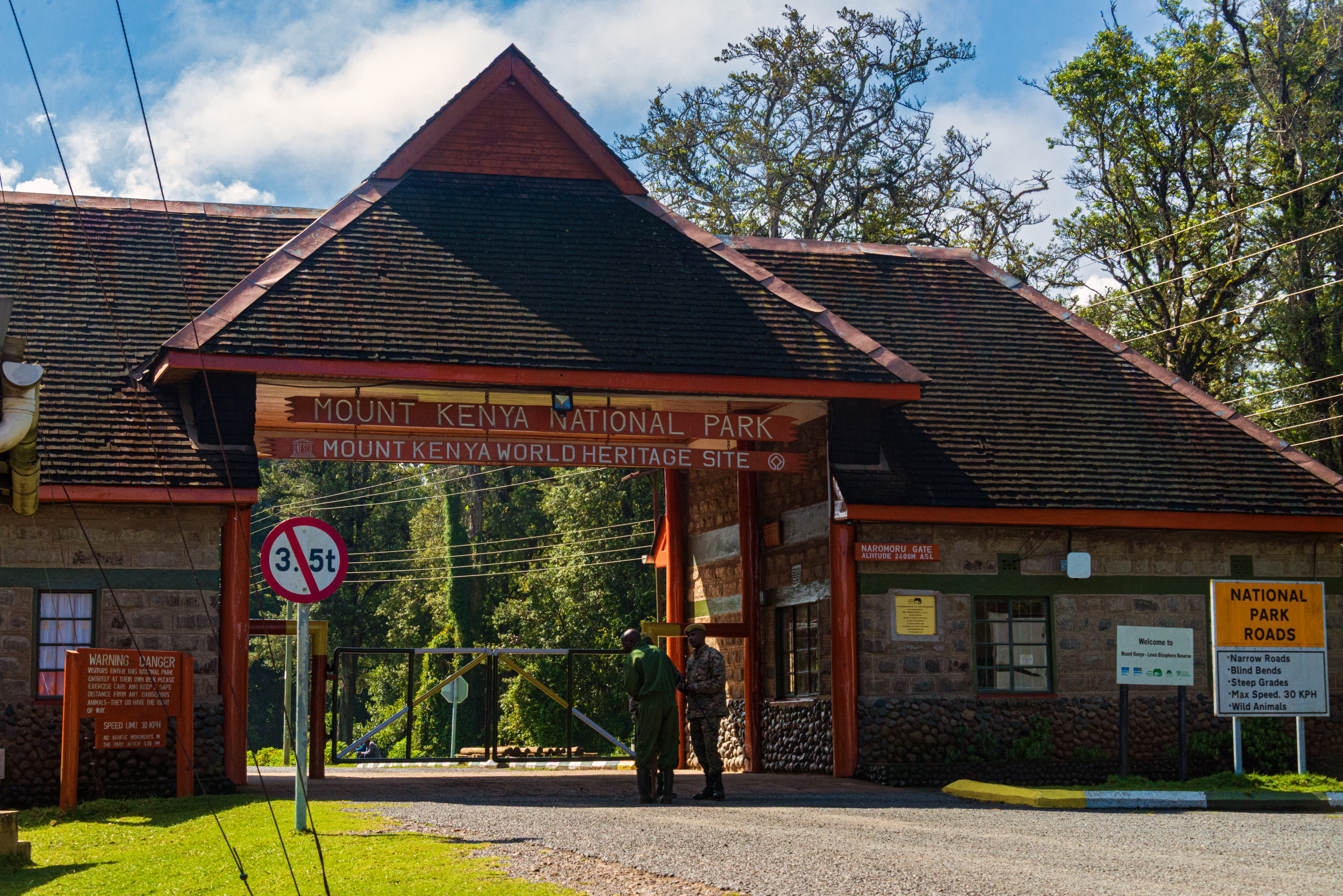
- Mount Kenya National Park gate

- Location within Kenya
- Location: Kenya
- Coordinates: 0°07′26″S 37°20′12″E
- Area: 715 km^{2} (276 sq mi)
- Established: 1949
- Governing body: Kenya Wildlife Service

UNESCO World Heritage Site
- Official name: Mount Kenya National Park/Natural Forest
- Type: Natural
- Criteria: vii, ix
- Designated: 1997 (21st session)
- Reference no.: 800
- Region: Africa
- Extension: 2013

Mount Kenya National Park (Hifadhi ya Taifa ya Mlima Kenya, in Swahili) is a national park in Kenya that was established in 1949 around Mount Kenya to protect its surrounding environment and wildlife. It is also a drainage basin for the region's water supply.

== History ==
Initially, it was a forest reserve, before being announced as a national park. Currently, the national park is encircled by the forest reserve. In April 1978, the area was designated a UNESCO Biosphere Reserve. Combined, the national park and forest reserve became a UNESCO World Heritage Site in 1997.

The Government of Kenya had four reasons for creating a national park on and around Mount Kenya. These were the importance of tourism for the local and national economies, to preserve an area of great scenic beauty, to conserve the biodiversity within the park, and to preserve the water-catchment for the surrounding area.

== Area ==
Mount Kenya National Park has an area of 715 km^{2} (276 sq mi), most of which is above the 3,000 m (9,800 ft) contour line. The forest reserve has an area of 705 km^{2} (272 sq mi). Combined, this makes the area of the UNESCO World Heritage Site 1,420 km^{2} (550 sq mi).

Volcanic sediment in the surrounding region's soil and the huge volume of fresh water coming down the slopes makes the area particularly favorable for agriculture.

== Fauna ==
A small portion of this park's borders near heavy populations has electrified fences to keep the elephants out of the surrounding farmland. At lower elevations, black-and-white colobus and other monkeys, and Cape buffaloes are prevalent. In 1993, a huge male lion weighing 272 kg (600 pounds) was shot near the mountain.

== See also ==
- List of World Heritage Sites in Kenya
- East Africa
- Wildlife of Kenya
