= Soysambu Conservancy =

National park of Kenya

The Soysambu Conservancy was created in 2007 to conserve the flora, fauna and scenery of the Soysambu ranch near Gilgil in the Rift Valley Province of Kenya. It covers 48,000 acres (190 km^{2}) and borders the Elmenteita Badlands in the south, near Mawe Mbili, and Lake Nakuru National Park in the west.

== History ==
Since it was founded by Hugh Cholmondeley, 3rd Baron Delamere, in 1906, the Soysambu ranch has been owned and managed by the Delamere family. Current operations include a large beef herd, a hay baling operation and an agri-forestry enterprise. Having previously found the cost of preserving wildlife exorbitant, the owners entered into a partnership to form the Soysambu Conservancy in order to promote public access, best management practices and a new business model.

Notable visitors to the estate have included Winston Churchill, who picnicked by Lake Elmenteita in 1908 after some pigsticking, Part of Tomb Raider 3 was filmed on the northern shores of the lake.

== Wildlife ==
=== Pelican nesting site ===
Pelicans at the mouth of the Mereroni River, at the northern shore of Lake Elementeita. The hill in the background is known as "Sleeping Warrior."

The conservancy covers the northern, western and part of the southern shores of Lake Elmenteita, the last remaining breeding site for pelicans in Kenya. They nest on rocky islands in the lake but feed elsewhere, in Lake Nakuru, 10 km to the west, bringing back fish (primarily Tilapia grahamii) for their young. Some of the tilapia have escaped into the waters of Lake Elmenteita, where they breed in the Kekopey hot springs.

=== Translocated animals ===
In addition to the more than 50 mammal species found in Soysambu, 11 Rothschild's giraffe were translocated on from Lake Nakuru National Park in 1995 and one from Giraffe Manor. This was carried out by the Kenya Wildlife Service in conjunction with the Lewa Wildlife Conservancy. In 2002 a complete family of Colobus monkeys was moved into the riverine forest from an area near Gilgil, where their habitat was fast being destroyed. This was facilitated by the Wakuluzi Colobus Trust.

== Conservancy projects ==
The Conservancy's projects include:

- Fencing project around 2 sides of Soysambu leaving the park on the west and the wildlife corridor to the South East.
- Operational capital expenditure for rangers' uniforms, equipment and vehicles.
- Wetland restoration of the Mbaruk rivermouth by putting a bund in the swamp and restoration of the riverine gallery forest by restoring the old furrow.
- The Elementeita Health Centre needs assistance to complete the construction which DEL started and to equip it. It is hoped that St. Mary's hospital, a neighbour, will operate it as a referral centre.
- To convert Sugonoi house into a research centre for student activities and wildlife research which allows much better management decisions.
- Information gathering about the plethora of prehistoric sites and areas of anthropological interest. Also to work with the Museums of Kenya on gazettement of some of the key sites.
- To develop Lake Elementeita's future status as a World Heritage Site, developing plans and consensus building through consultative workshops.
- A livestock management project for neighbouring farmers which involves rehabilitating and refilling some cattle dips together with some advice on husbandry. In future SCL should like to assure value addition for their stock marketing services through a milk collection centre and the slaughterhouse.
