= Lake Magadi =

Lake Kajiado County, Kenya

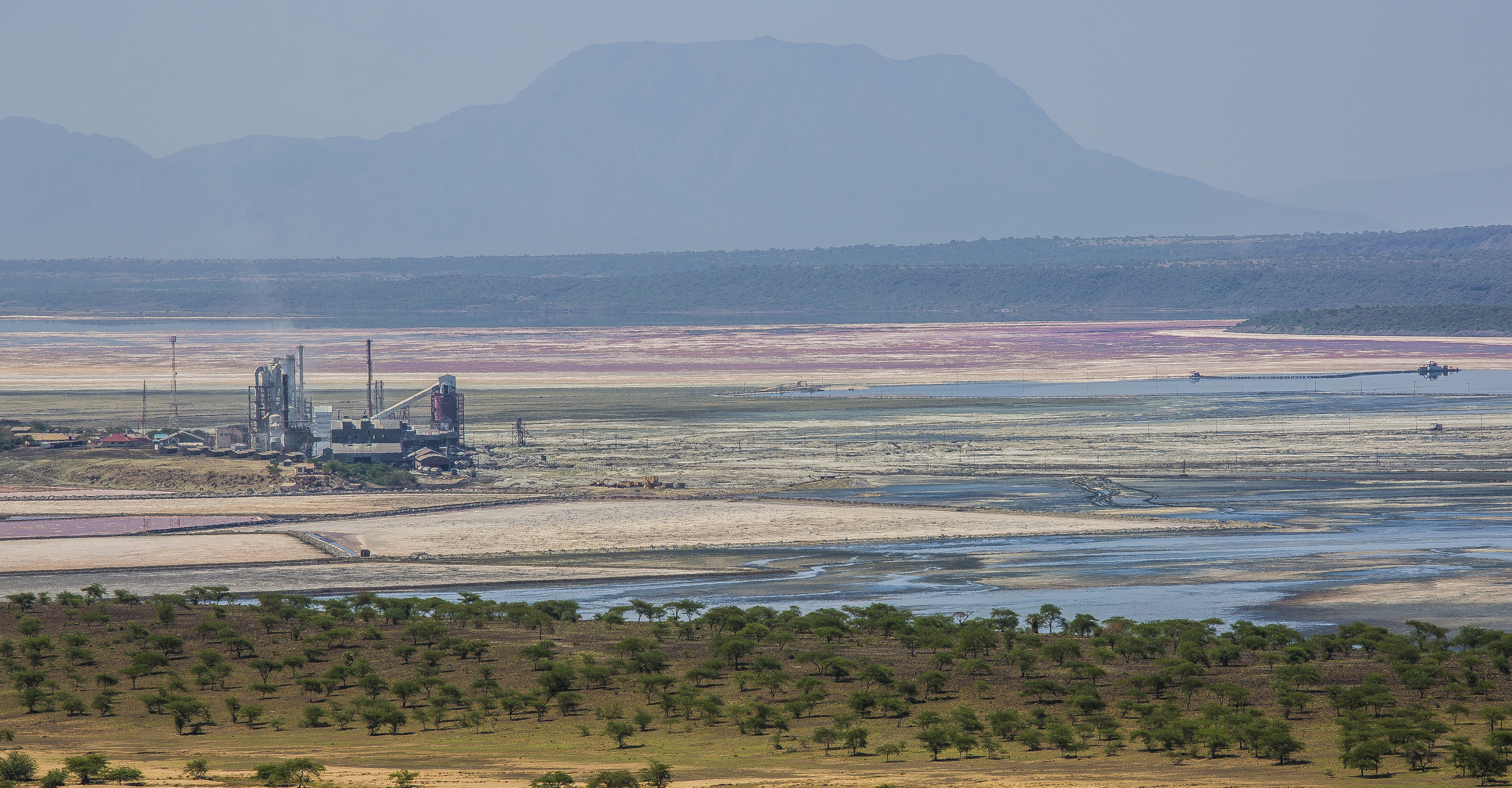

- Location within Kenya Location within Africa
- Location: Kenyan Rift Valley
- Coordinates: 1°55′S 36°16′E
- Basin countries: Kenya
- Surface area: 100 km^{2} (39 sq mi)

Lake Magadi is the southernmost lake in the Kenyan Rift Valley.

== Description ==
Lake Magadi is the southernmost lake in the Kenyan Rift Valley, lying in a catchment of faulted volcanic rocks, north of Tanzania's Lake Natron. During the dry season, it is 80% covered by soda.

Lake Magadi is a saline, alkaline lake, approximately 100 square kilometres (39 sq mi) in area. It lies in an endorheic basin formed by a graben. The lake is an example of a saline pan. The lake water, which is a dense sodium carbonate brine, precipitates vast quantities of the mineral trona (sodium sesquicarbonate). In places, the salt is up to 40 metres (130 ft) thick. The lake is recharged mainly by saline hot springs (temperatures up to 86 °C) that discharge into alkaline "lagoons" around the lake margins, leaving little surface runoff in this region. Most hot springs lie along the northwestern and southern shorelines of the lake. During the rainy season, a thin layer (less than 1 metre (3 ft 3 in)) of brine covers much of the saline pan, but it evaporates rapidly, leaving an expanse of white salt that cracks to produce large polygons.

== History ==
Lake Magadi was not always so saline. Several thousand years ago (during the late Pleistocene to mid-Holocene in the African humid period), the Magadi basin held a freshwater lake with many different fish species, whose remains are preserved in the High Magadi Beds, a series of lacustrine and volcaniclastic sediments preserved in various locations around the present shoreline. Evidence also exists for several older Pleistocene precursor lakes that were much larger than the present Lake Magadi. At times, Lake Magadi and Lake Natron were united to form a single larger lake.

== Deposits ==
Lake Magadi is known for its deposits of siliceous chert. There are many varieties including bedded cherts that formed in the lake and intrusive dike-like bodies that penetrated through overlying sediments while the silica was soft. The most famous is the "Magadi-type chert", which formed from a sodium silicate mineral precursor magadiite that was discovered at the lake in 1967.

Magadiite, a rare hydrous sodium-silicate mineral [NaSi_{7}O_{13}(OH)_{3}·4(H_{2}O)], was discovered about 50 years ago in sediments around Lake Magadi, a hypersaline alkaline lake fed by hot springs in the semi-arid southern Kenya Rift Valley.

== Native wildlife ==
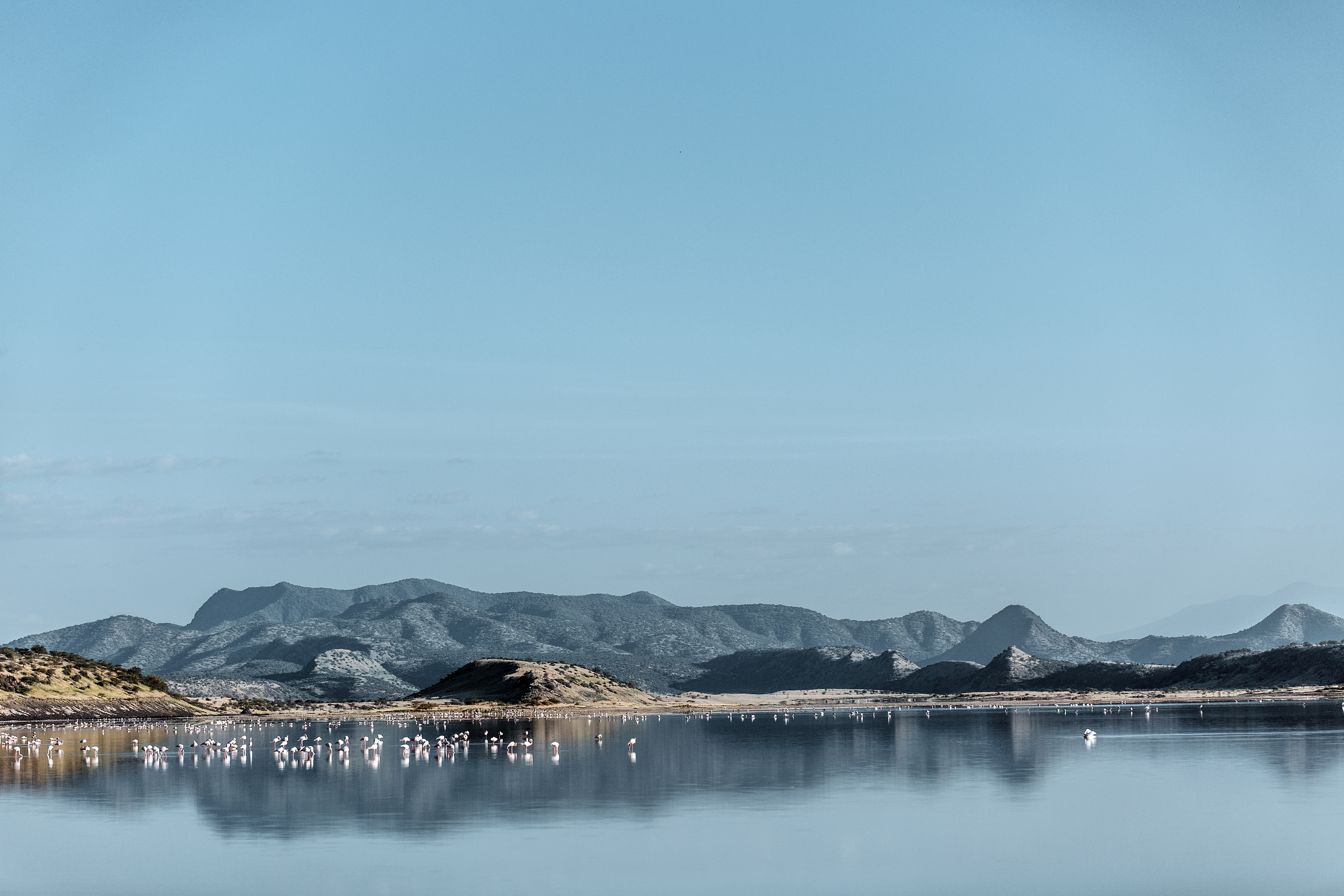
Flamingos on the lake

The harsh lacustrine environment excludes most organisms. Exceptions are microbial extremophiles, a few invertebrates (mostly insects), and wading birds, including flamingos. A single species of fish, a cichlid Alcolapia grahami, inhabits the hot, highly alkaline waters of the lake basin. It can be seen in some of the hot spring pools around the shoreline, where the water temperature is less than 45 °C.

Burrows discovered in outcrops of the High Magadi Beds (~25–9 ka) that predate the modern saline (trona) pan show that beetles and other invertebrates inhabit this extreme environment when conditions are more favorable.

=== Fossil remains ===
Burrows (cm-scale) preserved in magadiite in the High Magadi Beds are filled with mud, silt and sand from overlying sediments. Their stratigraphic context reveals upward-shallowing cycles from mud to interlaminated mud-magadiite to magadiite in dm-scale units. The burrows were formed when the lake floor became fresher and oxygenated, after a period when magadiite precipitated in shallow saline waters. The burrows, probably produced by beetles, suggest that trace fossils can provide evidence for short-term (ranging from years to decades) changes in the contemporary environment that might not otherwise be recognized or preserved physically or chemically in the sediment record.

== Uses ==
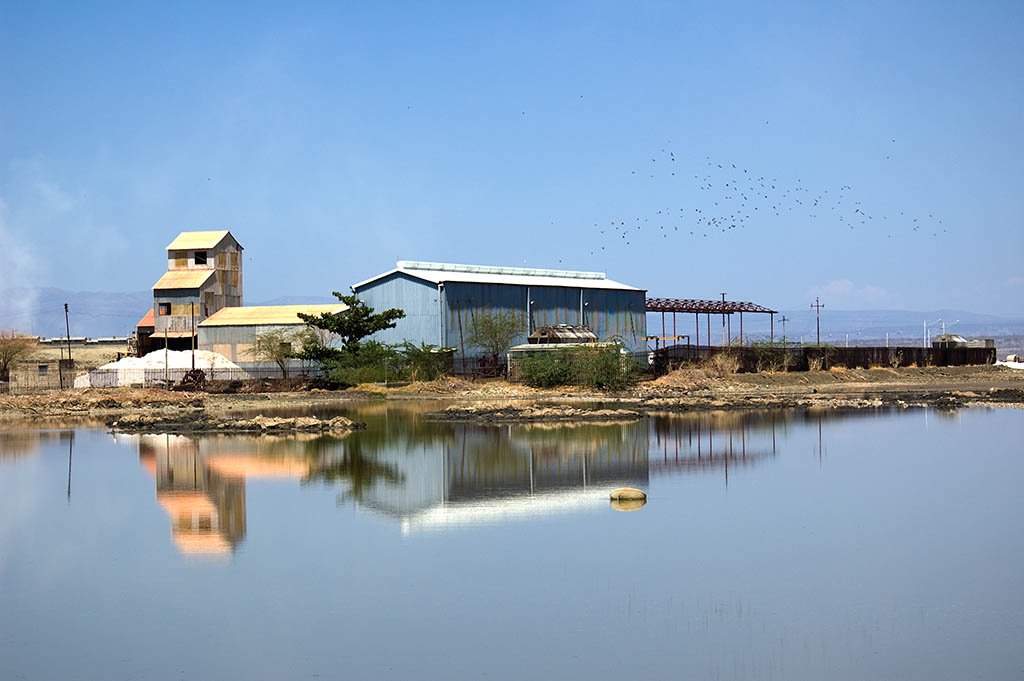
Soda ash plant on the shore of Lake Magadi

Magadi township lies on the lake's east shore, and is home to the Magadi Soda Company, owned by Tata India since December 2005. This factory produces soda ash, which has a range of industrial uses.

The lake is featured in Fernando Meirelles's film The Constant Gardener, which is based on the book of the same name by John le Carré, and is used as a stand-in for Lake Turkana in the north of Kenya, where the book and film are set.

A causeway that crosses the lake provides access to the area west of the lake (Nguruman Escarpment). Recently accommodation for tourists is provided in air conditioned canvas tents.
