= Elmenteita =

- Location within Kenya
- Coordinates: 0.48°S 36.15°E
- Country: Kenya
- Province: Rift Valley Province
- Time zone: UTC+3 (EAT)

Elmenteita is a settlement in Kenya's Rift Valley Province.
