= Lake Elmenteita =

Lake in Kenya

Lake Elementaita
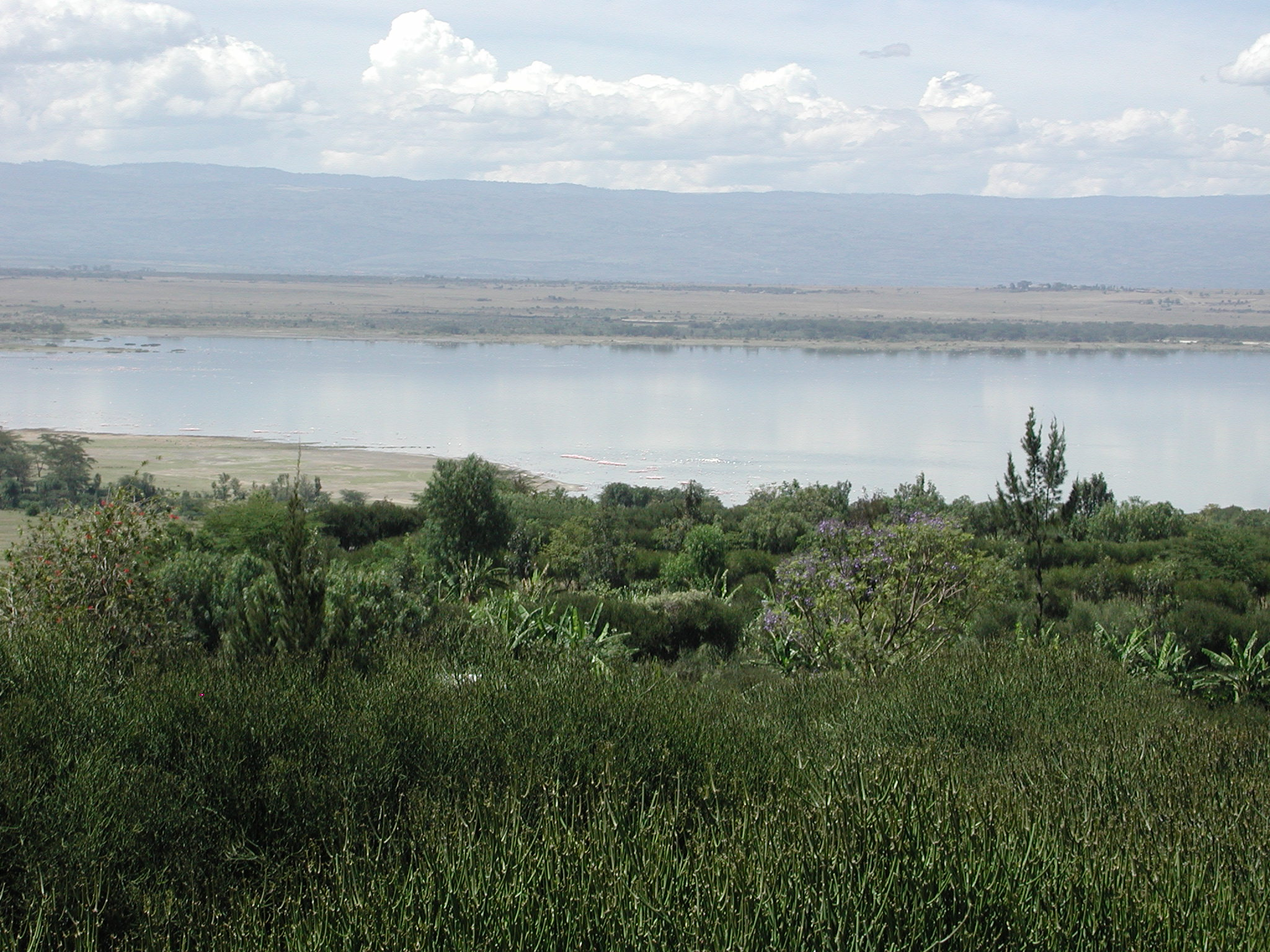

- Location within Kenya Location within Africa
- Coordinates: 0°27′S 36°15′E
- Basin countries: Kenya
- Surface area: 18 km^{2} (6.9 sq mi)
- Surface elevation: 1,670 m (5,480 ft) ASL

Ramsar Wetland
- Designated: 5 September 2005
- Reference no.: 1498

UNESCO World Heritage Site
- Official name: Kenyan Lake System of the Great Rift Valley
- Criteria: Natural: vii, ix, x
- Reference: 1060
- Inscription: 2011 (35th Session)

Lake Elmenteita is a soda lake, in the Great Rift Valley, about 120 km northwest of Nairobi, Kenya.

== Geography ==
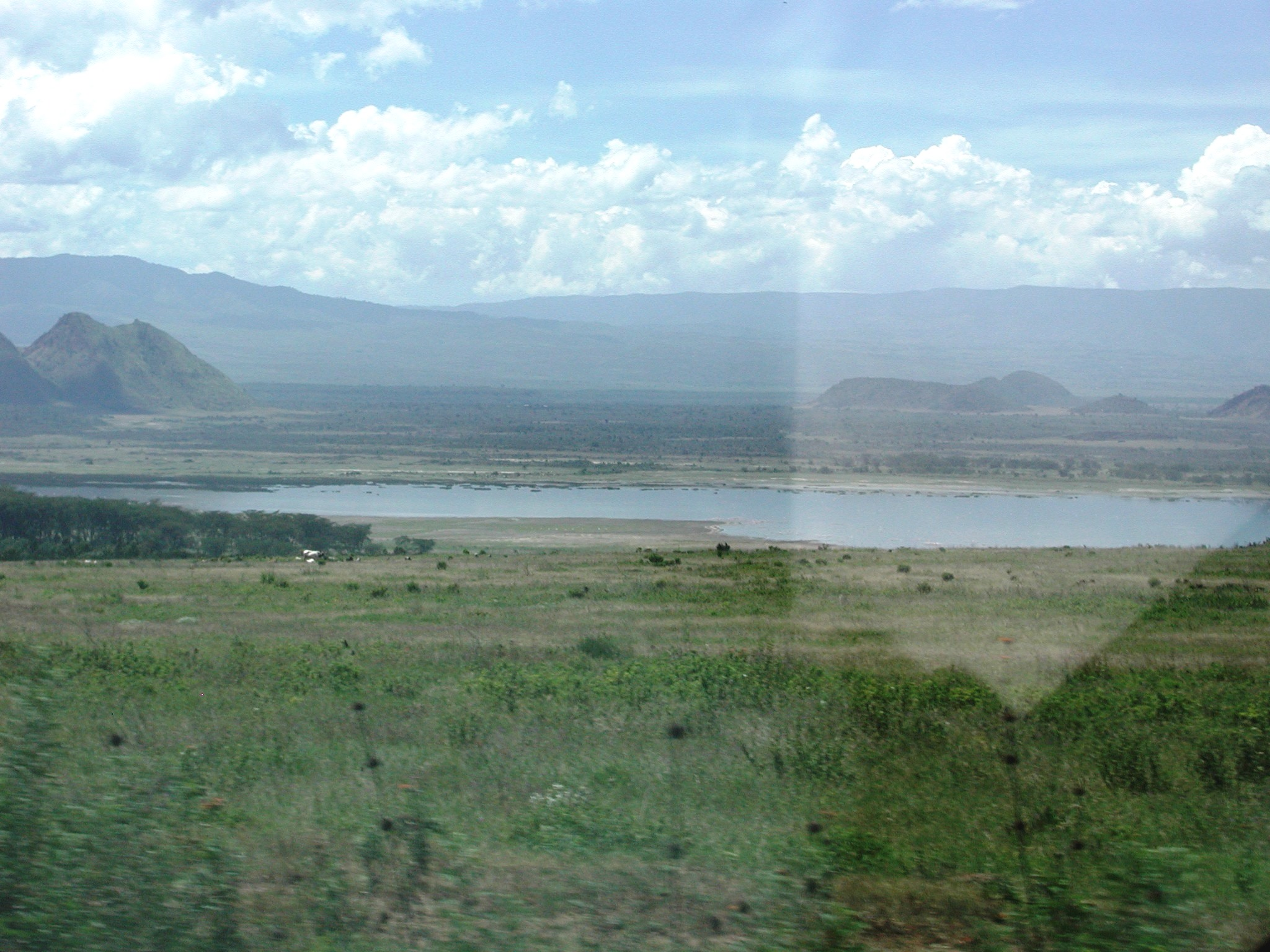
Lake Elmenteita from the Nairobi-Nakuru highway

Elmenteita is derived from the Maasai word muteita, meaning "dust place", a reference to the dryness and dustiness of the area, especially from January to March. The town of Gilgil is near the lake. In the south-to-north sequence of Rift Valley lakes, Elmenteita is between Lake Naivasha and Lake Nakuru. Along the nearby escarpment, the major Nairobi-Nakuru highway (A104 Road) gives motorists a spectacular vista of the lake. Today the lake is a protected area due to its bird life and has been named as a UNESCO World Heritage Site together with Lake Nakuru and Lake Bogoria.

About 10,000 years ago, Lake Elementaita, together with the neighboring Nakuru and Bogoria, formed one single, deep freshwater lake that eventually dried up, leaving the three lakes as remnants.

At the southern end of the lake are the "Kekopey" hot springs, in which an introduced fish, the Lake Magadi tilapia, breed. The reed beds nearby are fishing grounds for night herons and pelicans.

It is a soda lake (high alkalinity, high biodiversity).

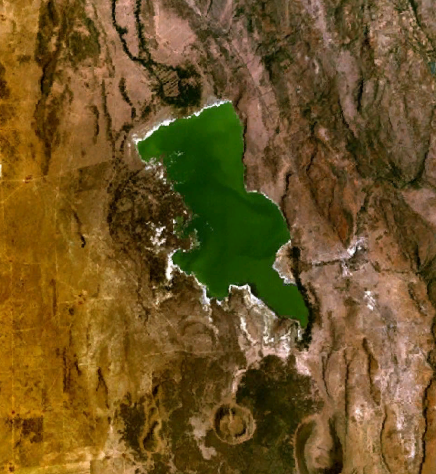
Lake Elmenteita, as seen from space.

== History ==
The Lake Elmenteita area saw its first white settlement when Hugh Cholmondeley, 3rd Baron Delamere (1879−-1931) established the Soysambu ranch on 190-square-kilometre (48,000-acre) of land on the western side of the lake. He gifted land on the other side of the lake to his brother-in-law, Galbraith Lowry Egerton Cole (1881−1929), part of whose Kekopey ranch, where he is buried, is preserved today as the Lake Elementaita Lodge.

The Soysambu ranch, which is still owned by the Delamere family, covers two-thirds of the shoreline and is home to over 12,000 wild animals. The lake itself has been a Ramsar site since 2005.

== Ecology ==
Over 400 bird species have been recorded in the Lake Nakuru/Lake Elmenteita basin. Elmenteita attracts visiting flamingoes, both the greater and lesser varieties, which feed on the lake's crustacean and insect larvae and on its suspended blue-green algae, respectively. Lake Magadi tilapia were introduced to the lake from Lake Magadi in 1962 and since that time the flamingo population has dwindled considerably. The tilapia attract many fish-eating birds that also feed upon the flamingo eggs and chicks. Over a million birds that formerly bred at Elmenteita are now said to have sought refuge at Lake Natron in Tanzania.

The lake's shores are grazed by zebra, gazelle, eland and families of warthog.

The lake is normally very shallow (less than 1 m deep) and bordered by trona-encrusted mudflats during the dry seasons. During the late Pleistocene and early Holocene, Lake Elmenteita was at times united with an expanded Lake Nakuru, forming a much larger dilute lake. Remnants of the former joined lake are preserved as sediments at various locations around the lake basins, including former shorelines.

Recently the lake level and number of flamingoes has receded as increased human activity has dried up catchment areas.

== Associated sites ==
Nearby is the Kariandusi Museum, at an important prehistoric site where stone handaxes and cleavers were discovered in 1928 by Louis Leakey.

Elmenteita Badlands is a lava flow to the south of the lake, covered in bush and including some spectacularly scenic peaks.

== See also ==
- List of World Heritage Sites in Kenya
