= Lake Nakuru =

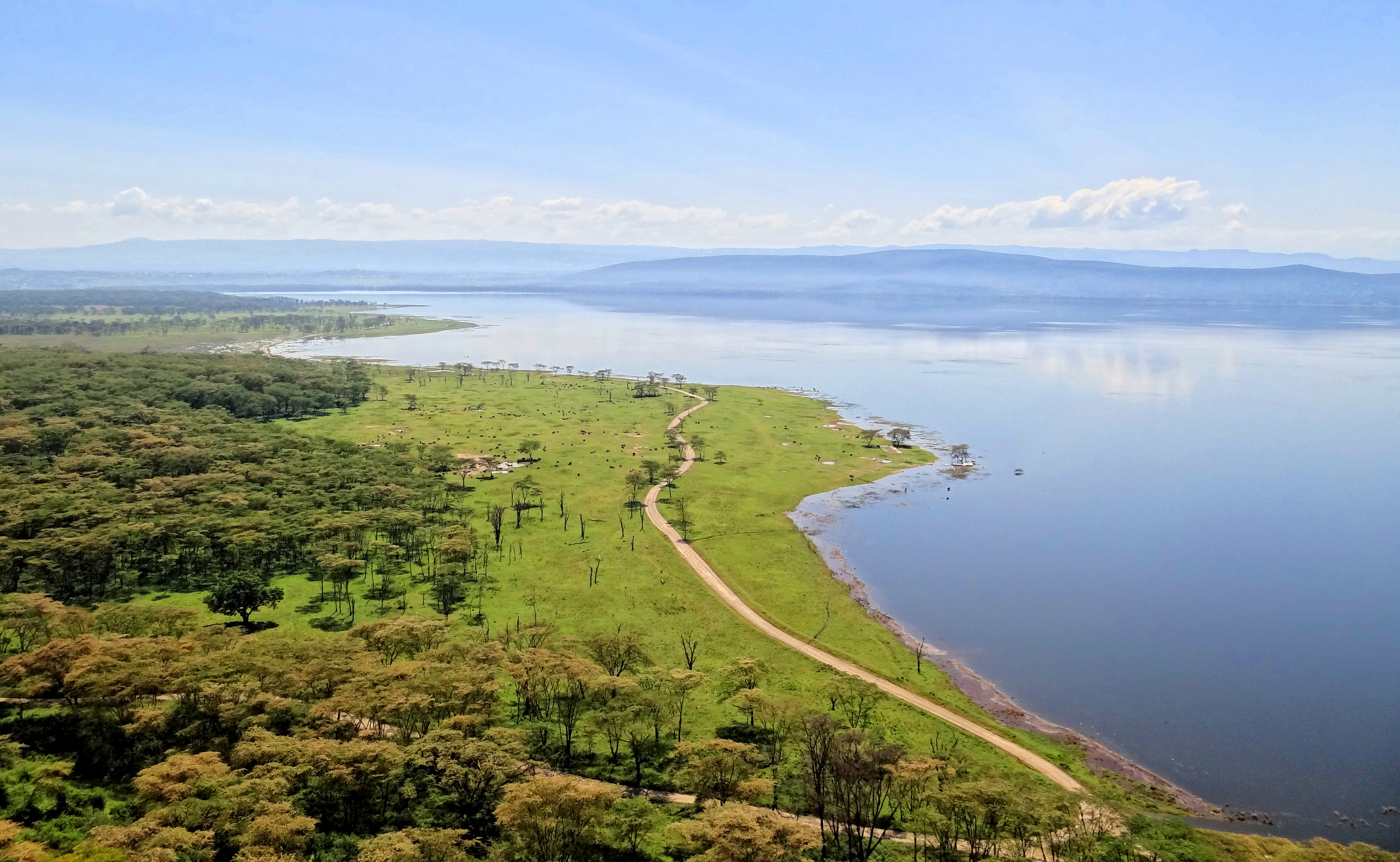
- View of lake from Baboon cliff

- Location within Kenya
- Location: Nairobi
- Coordinates: 0°22′S 36°05′E
- Lake type: alkaline lake
- Primary outflows: Lake Nakuru has no outflow. No rivers or cracks flowing out of Lake Nakuru
- Basin countries: Kenya
- Surface area: 5 to 45 km^{2} (1.9 to 17.4 sq mi)
- Average depth: 1 foot (0.30 m)
- Max. depth: 6 feet (1.8 m)
- Surface elevation: 1,754 m (5,755 ft)
- Frozen: Lake Nakuru is nestled in the vast great Rift Valley. The lake never freezes.

Ramsar Wetland
- Designated: 5 June 1990
- Reference no.: 476

UNESCO World Heritage Site
- Official name: Kenya Lake System of the Great Rift Valley
- Criteria: Natural: vii, ix, x
- Reference: 1060
- Inscription: 2011 (35th Session)
- IUCN category II (national park)

Lake Nakuru is one of the Rift Valley lakes, located at an elevation of 1,754 m (5,755 ft) above sea level. It lies to the south of Nakuru, in the rift valley of Kenya and is protected by Lake Nakuru National Park.

About 10,000 years ago, Lake Nakuru, together with neighboring Lake Elementaita and Lake Bogoria, formed one single, deep freshwater lake that eventually dried up, leaving the three lakes as remnants. In 2011 the three lakes were inscribed by UNESCO as a World Heritage Site, Kenya Lake System of the Great Rift Valley.

Water levels in Lake Nakuru have varied considerably, with the lake almost drying up several times over the past 50 years. A significant drop happened in the early 1990s. In 2013, levels again increased rapidly, leading to the migration of many flamingos to Lake Bogoria in search of food supply. Between 2010 and 2020 Lake Nakuru increased in surface area from 40 to 68 square kilometres (15 to 26 sq mi). 677 households, parts of Nakuru town and some National Park areas had been flooded.

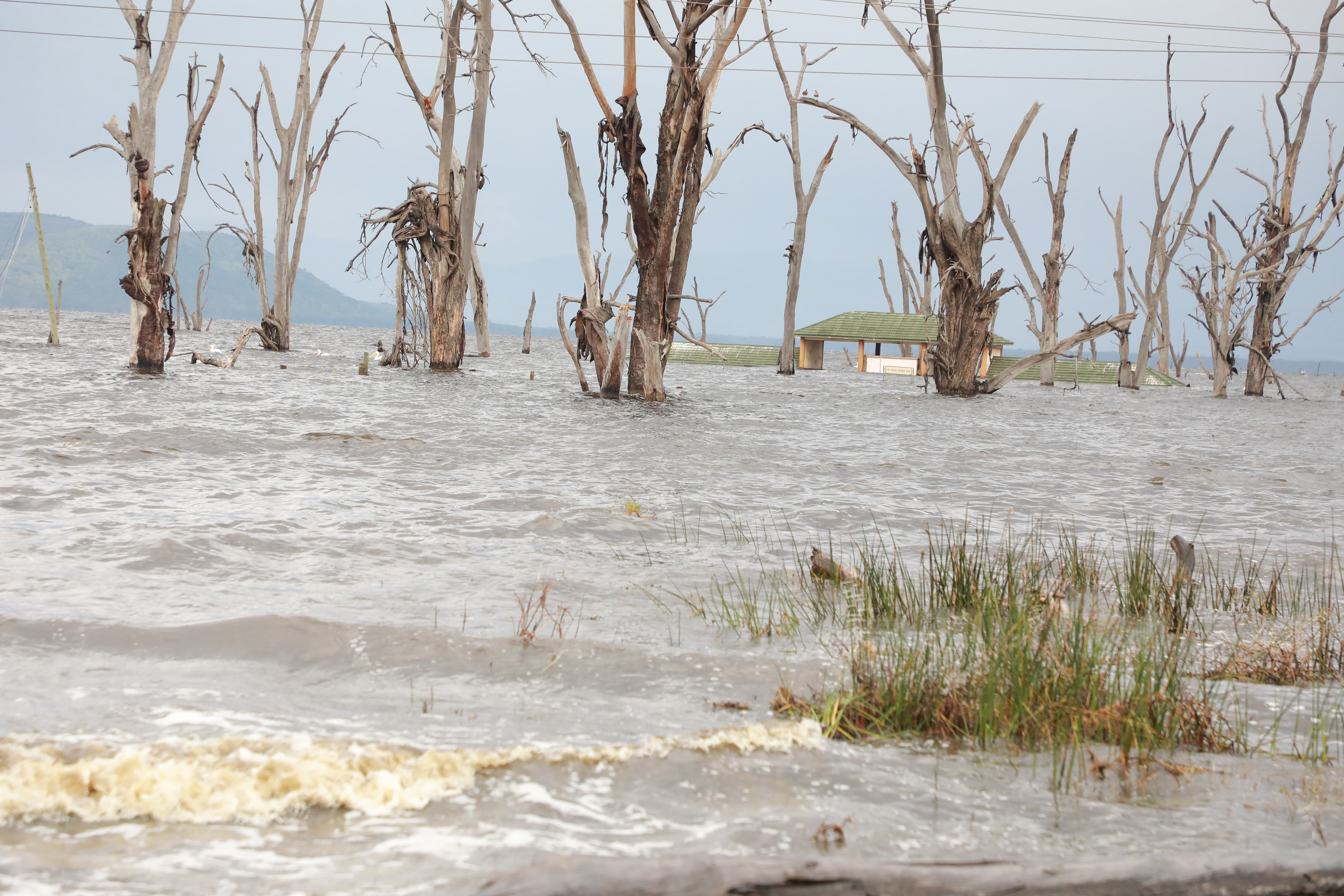
Submersion of the main gate of Lake Nakuru National Park in 2024 due to rising water levels

Since 2021, there has been an alarming increase in the rising water levels at the lake caused by climate change. This upsurge of water levels led to displacement of animals from the park and destruction of property, submersion of the main entrance gate and other park infrastructure. Lake Nakuru's surface area expanded roughly 37% between 2011 and 2021 (from a previous of 43 km^{2} to 68 km^{2}), this was majorly driven by documented shift in Indian Ocean moisture rather than local rainfall alone.

Lake Nakuru is protected under the Ramsar Convention on wetlands.

== Lake Nakuru National Park ==
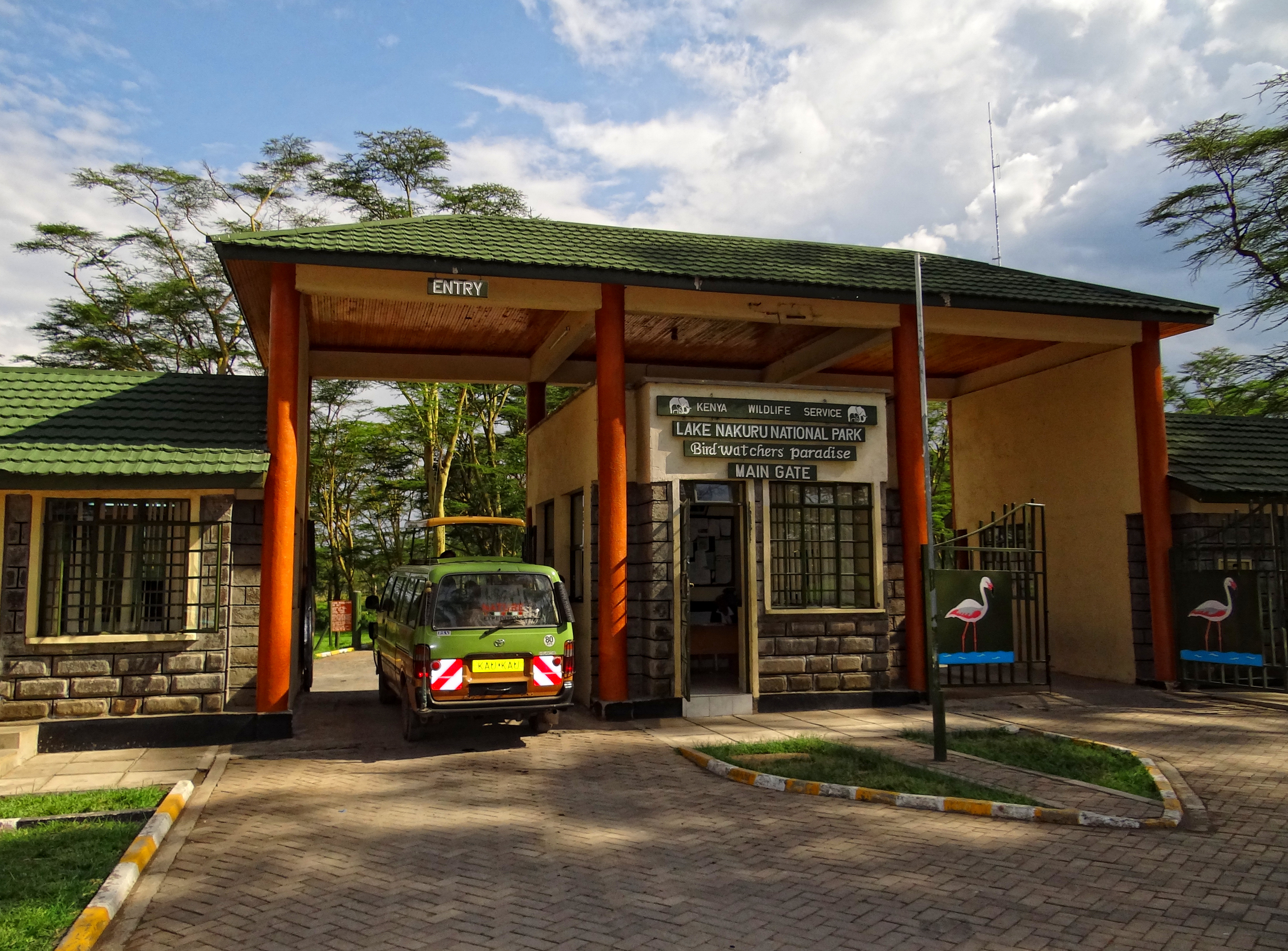
National Park entrance

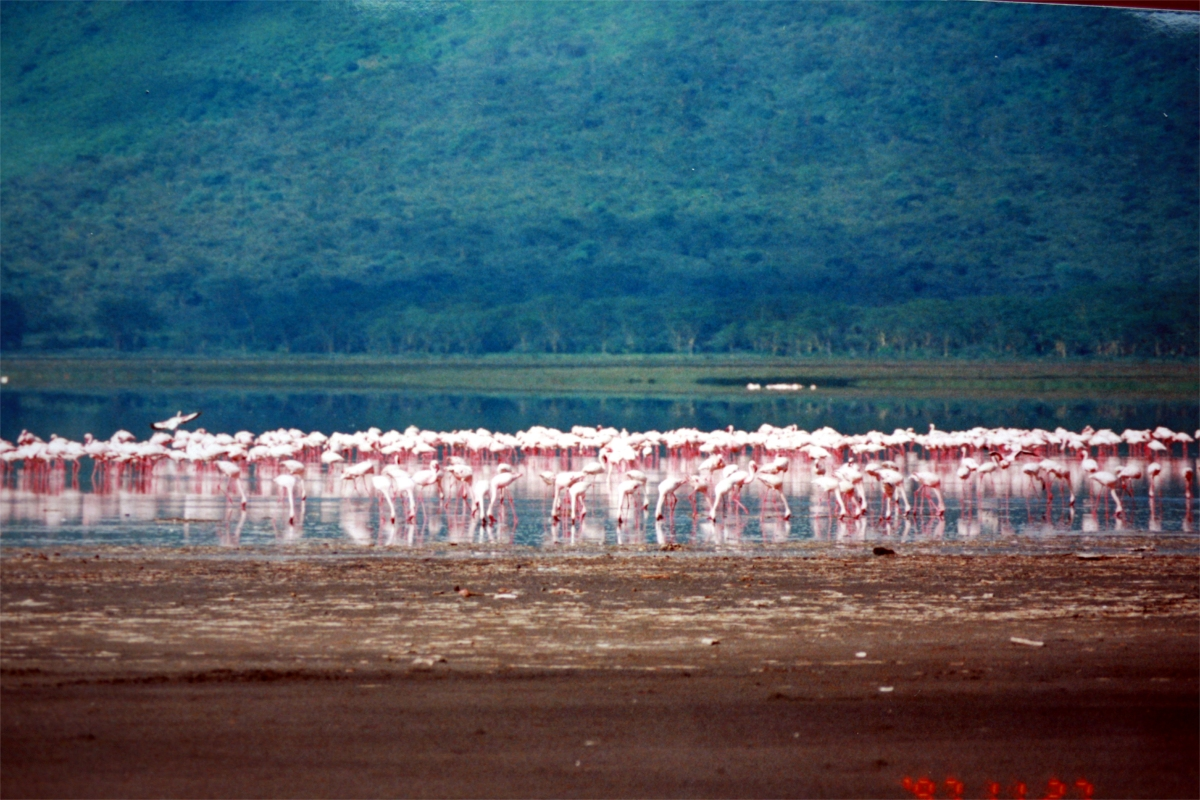
Flamingos feeding at Lake Nakuru in 1997

Lake Nakuru National Park (188 km^{2}, 73 mi^{2}) was created in 1961 around Lake Nakuru, near Nakuru Town. It is best known for its thousands, sometimes millions of flamingos nesting along the shores. The surface of the shallow lake is often hardly recognizable due to the continually shifting mass of pink. The number of flamingos on the lake varies with water and food conditions and the best vantage point is from Baboon Cliff. Also, of interest is an area of 188 km (117 mi) around the lake fenced off as a sanctuary to protect giraffes as well as both black and white rhinos.

The park has recently been enlarged partly to provide a sanctuary for black rhinos. This endeavour has necessitated a fence – to keep out poachers rather than to restrict the movement of wildlife. The park stretches for 12.1 km (7.5 mi) on the south eastern boundary with the Soysambu Conservancy, which represents a possible future expansion of habitat for the rhinos and the only remaining wildlife corridor to Lake Naivasha.

In 2009, the park had more than 25 eastern black rhinoceros, one of the largest concentrations in the country, plus around 70 southern white rhinos. There are also a number of Rothschild's giraffe, again relocated for safety from western Kenya beginning in 1977. Waterbuck are very common and both the Kenyan subspecies are found here. Among the predators are lions, leopards and hyenas, the latter being seen much more frequently in recent times. The park also has large sized pythons that inhabit the dense woodlands, and can often be seen crossing the roads or dangling from trees.

As well as flamingos, there are a myriad of other bird species that inhabit the lake and the area surrounding it, such as African fish eagle, Goliath heron, hamerkop, pied kingfisher and Verreaux's eagle among others of their kind.

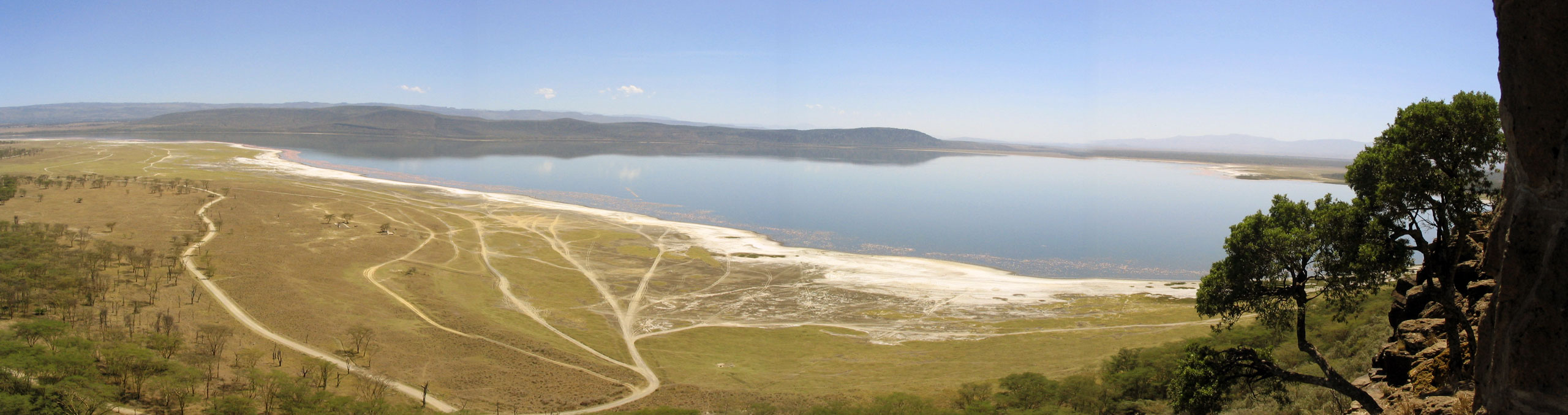
Lake Nakuru panoramic view from Baboon Cliff

== Habitat and wildlife ==
=== At Lake Nakuru ===
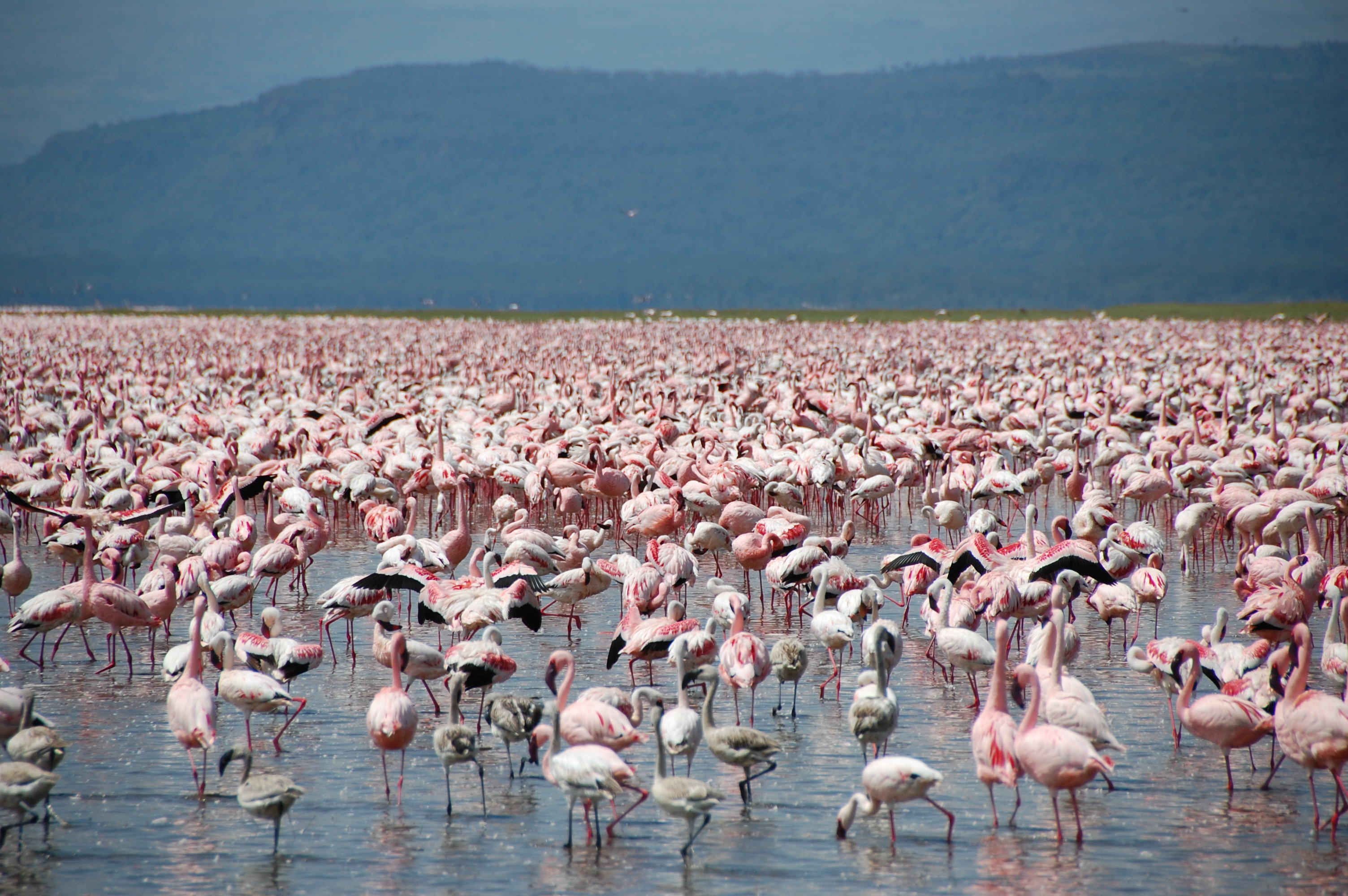
Many Flamingoes on Lake Nakuru, 2007

Lake Nakuru, a small (varying from 5 to 45 square kilometres [1.9 to 17.4 sq mi]) shallow alkaline lake on the southern edge of the town of Nakuru lies about 164 kilometres (102 mi) north of Nairobi. The lake is home to fuchsia pink flamingos, of which there are often more than a million, and sometimes two million. They feed on the abundant algae, which thrives in the warm waters. Scientists reckon that the flamingo population at Nakuru consumes about 250,000 kg (550,000 lb) of algae per hectare of surface area per year.

There are two types of flamingo species: the lesser flamingo (shorter and lighter) and the greater flamingo (taller and darker). The lesser flamingos are more commonly pictured in documentaries mainly because their larger numbers. The number of flamingos has been decreasing recently, possibly due to too much tourism or by pollution resulting from industrial waste dumping into the water sources in the surrounding area – changes in water quality make the lake temporarily inhospitable for flamingoes. Usually, the lake recedes during the dry season and floods during the wet season.

Since 1975, there have been wide variations between the dry and wet seasons' water levels. In the 1990’s, the water level of the site plunged dramatically. Then in 2013, it received a very large increase in water levels. Between 2013 and 2020, its surface area temporarily expanded from 15.4 sq mi (40 sq km) to 26.3 sq mi (68 sq km). This resulted in the flooding of hundreds of park areas and local homes.

It is suspected that these changes are caused by increasing watershed land conversion to intensive crop production and urbanization, both which reduce the capacity of soils to absorb water, recharge ground water and thus increase seasonal flooding.

Pollution and drought destroy the flamingos' food, Cyanobacteria called blue-green algae, causing them to migrate to the nearby Lakes, more recently Lakes Elementaita, Simbi Nyaima and Bogoria.

Local climate changes have also been hypothesized to contribute to the changing environmental conditions in the lakes catchment. Media reports in 1991 indicated increasing concern among stakeholders, as mass flamingo migrations and deaths could spell doom to the tourism industry. In 2024, Kenyan court decisions press on the local water treatment facility and named officials to clean up the discharges that affect Lake Nakuru Basin.

The flamingos feed on algae, created from their droppings into the warm alkaline waters, and plankton. But flamingo are not the only avian attraction; also present are two large fish eating birds, pelicans and cormorants. Despite the tepid and alkaline waters, a diminutive fish, Alcolapia grahami has flourished after being introduced in the early 1960s.

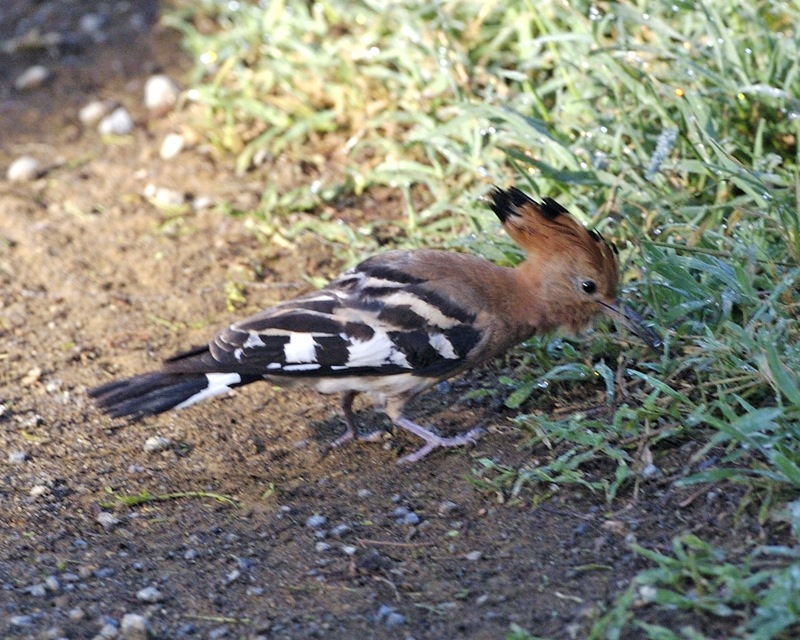
African Hoopoe at Lake Nakuru, 2008

The lake is rich in other bird life too. There are over 400 resident species on the lake and in the surrounding park. Thousands of both little grebes and white winged black terns are frequently seen as are stilts, avocets, ducks, and in the European winter the migrant waders.

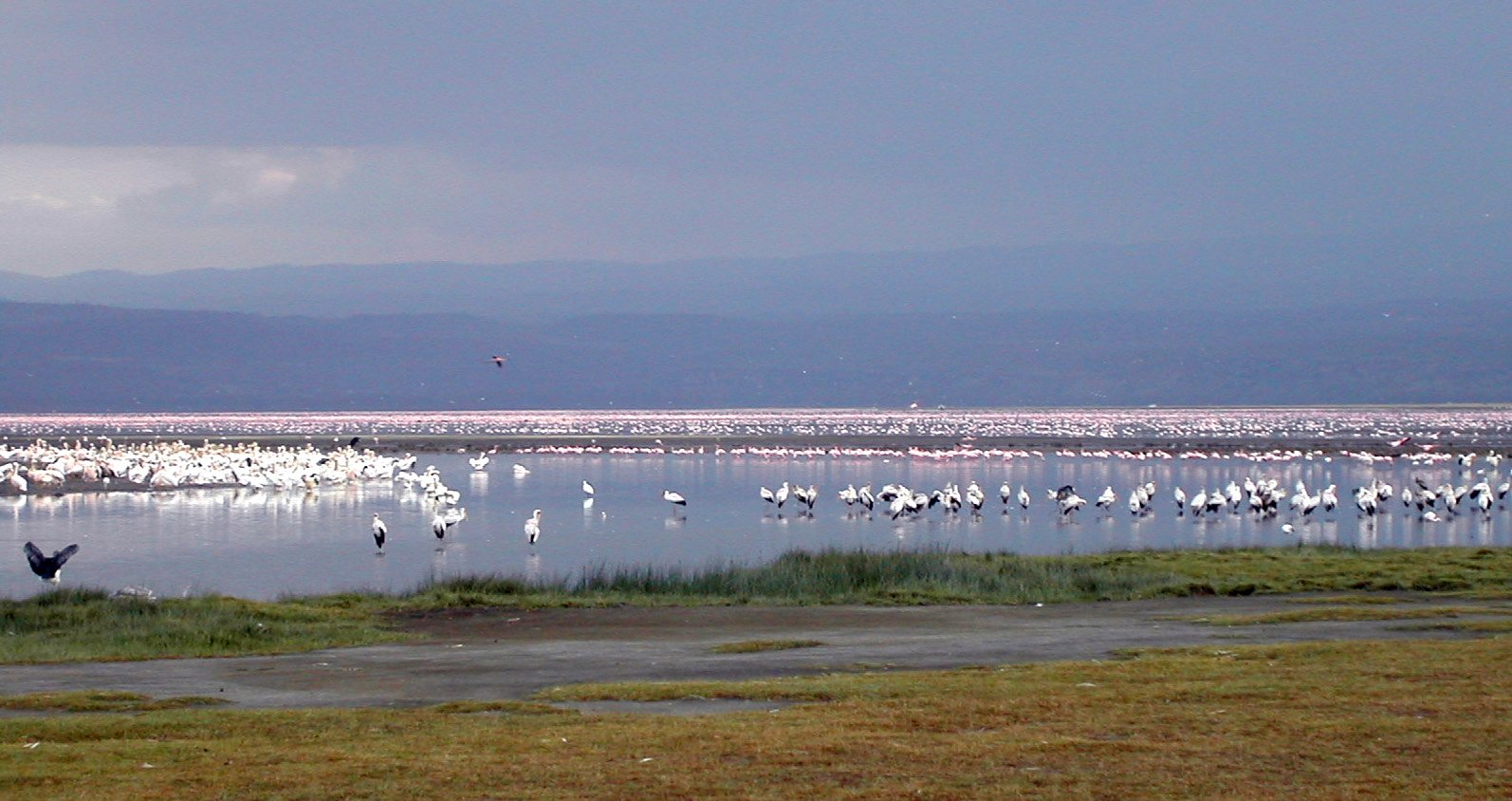
White storks, flamingoes and other birds at Lake Nakuru, 2008

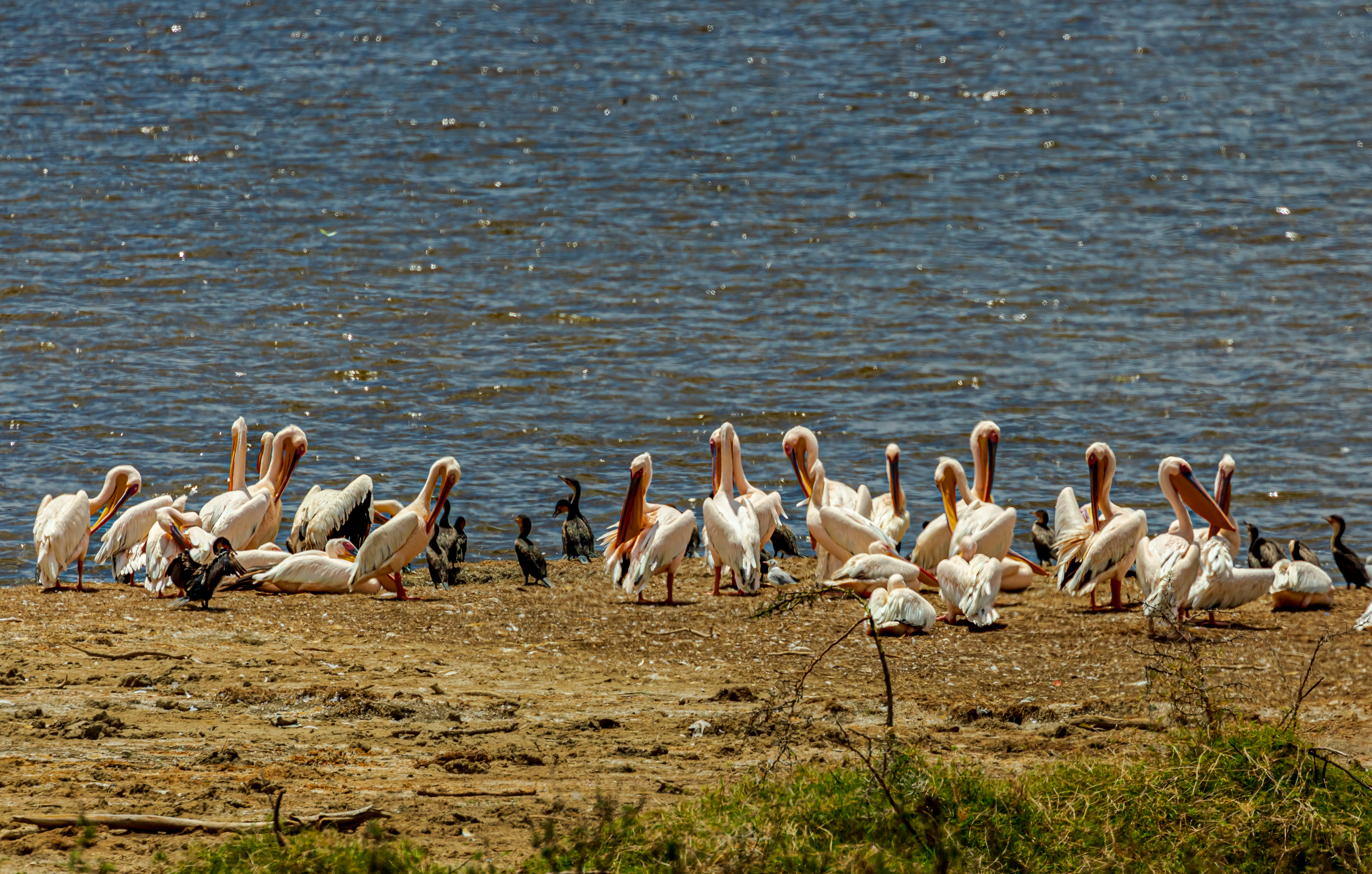
White Pelicans at Lake Nakuru, 2022

Zooplankton are present in this lake, part of the food for birds. The monogonont rotifer species Brachionus sp. Austria (belonging to the Brachionus plicatilis cryptic species complex) occurs in the lake.

=== On land in the park ===
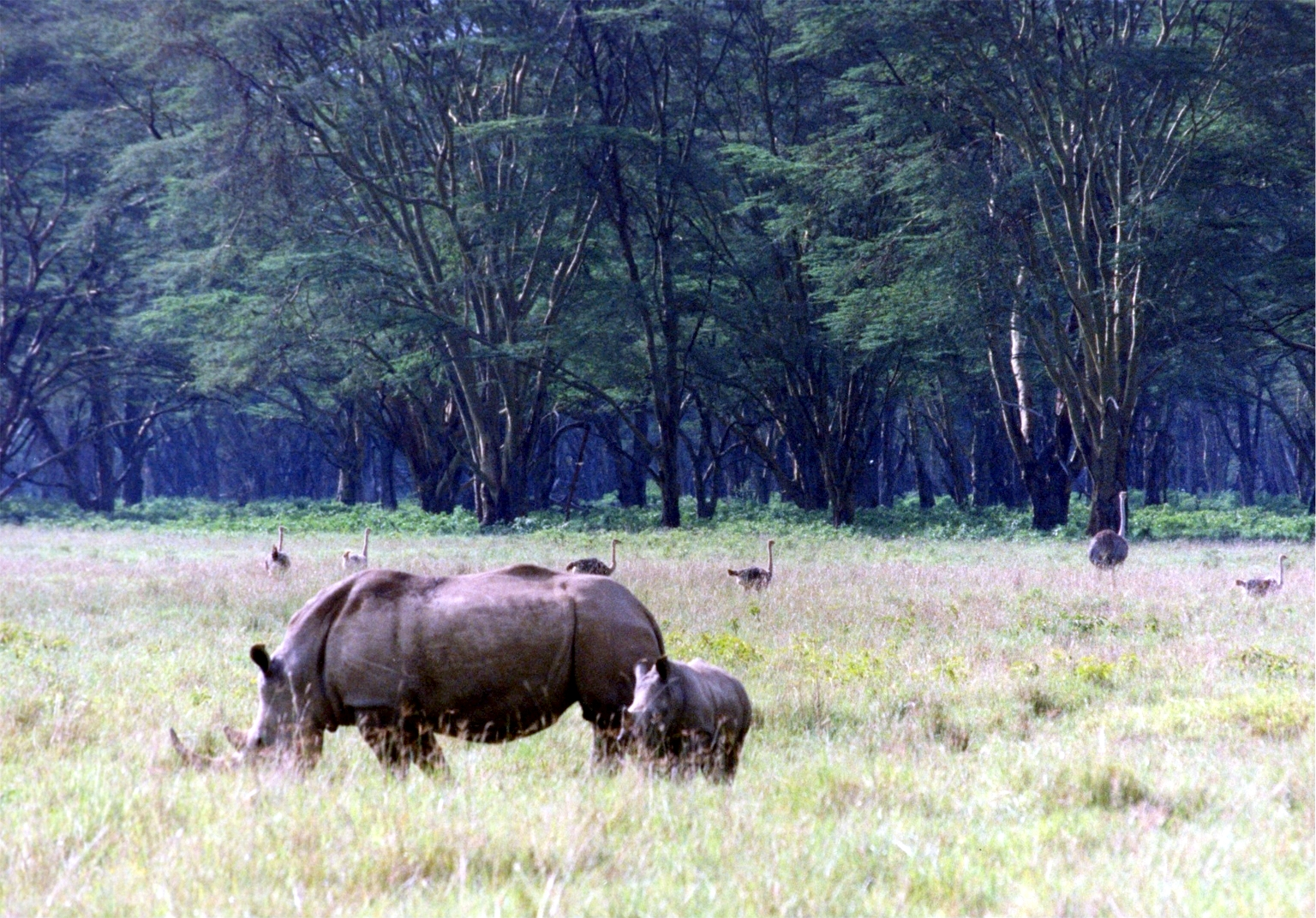
White Rhinos

The land surrounding Lake Nakuru is home to a variety of wildlife, especially species found only on the African continent.

Counts of species began in 1970 to assess the variety and extent of the animals in the park and note declines or increases over time.

Black and white rhinos thrive in the surrounding national park in the reserved area for rhinos. They are fenced to limit poaching. Also seen are Cape buffalo, African wild dog, zebra, eland and waterbuck.

There have been leopard sightings, and of the rare Rothschild’s giraffe. Its acacia and euphorbia forests are havens for animals during the heat of the day. The hippo pool allows viewing of that species.

== See also ==
- List of World Heritage Sites in Kenya
- Rift Valley lakes
- Great Rift Valley
- Rivers of Kenya
- Lake Nshenyi
