= Lake Natron =

Alkaline lake in Arusha Region, Tanzania

Lake Natron (Medusa lake)
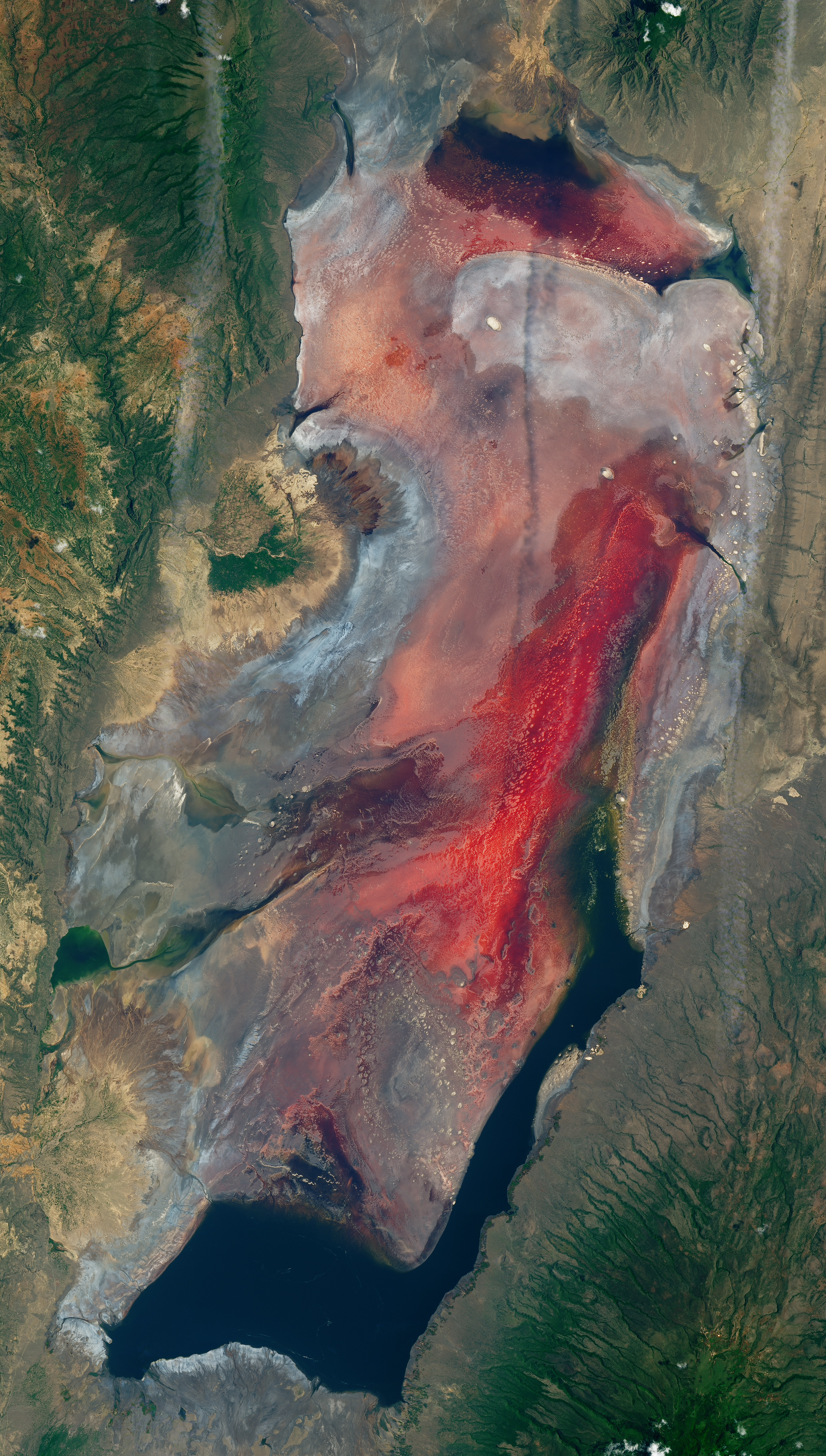
- The lake on 6 March 2017 (satellite image)

- Location within Tanzania
- Location: Ngorongoro District, Arusha Region, Tanzania, Kajiado County, Narok County, Kenya
- Coordinates: 02°25′S 36°00′E
- Lake type: saline
- Basin countries: Tanzania
- Surface area: 850–1,040 km^{2} (330–400 sq mi)
- Surface elevation: 600 metres (2,000 ft)

Ramsar Wetland
- Official name: Lake Natron Basin
- Designated: 4 July 2001
- Reference no.: 1080

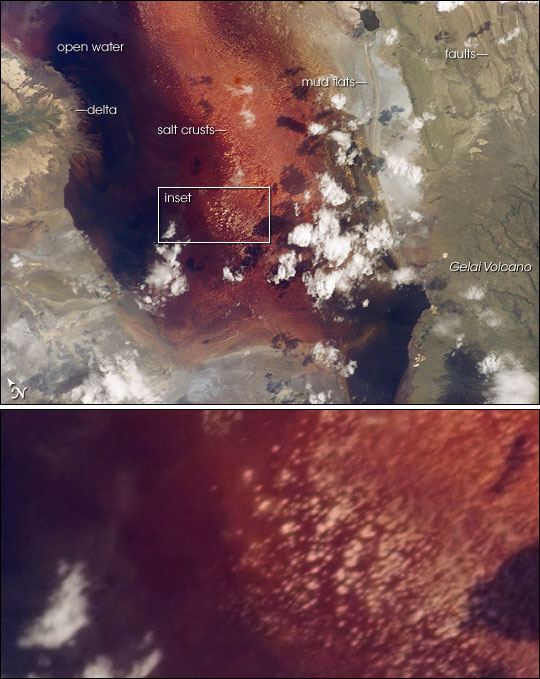
The southern half of Lake Natron (top). Fault scarps and the Gelai Volcano can also be seen. Numerous near-white salt-crust "rafts" pepper the shallowest parts of the lake (inset).

Lake Natron is a highly alkaline salt lake located in north Ngorongoro District of Arusha Region in Tanzania with its far northern end crossing into Kajiado County and Narok County in Kenya. It is in the Gregory Rift, which is the eastern branch of the East African Rift. The lake is within the Lake Natron Basin, a Ramsar Site wetland of international significance.

== Description ==
This lake is fed principally by the Southern Ewaso Ng'iro River, which rises in central Kenya, and by mineral-rich hot springs. It is quite shallow, less than three metres (9.8 ft) deep, and varies in width depending on its water level. The lake is a maximum of 57 kilometres (35 mi) long and 22 kilometres (14 mi) wide. The surrounding area receives irregular seasonal rainfall, mainly between December and May totalling 800 millimetres (31 in) per year. Temperatures at the lake are frequently above 40 °C (104 °F).

High levels of evaporation have left behind natron (sodium carbonate decahydrate) and trona (sodium sesquicarbonate dihydrate). The alkalinity of the lake can reach a pH of greater than 12. According to Live Science, the lake's high alkalinity is caused by sodium carbonate and other minerals that flow into the water from the surrounding environment. The surrounding bedrock is composed of alkaline, sodium-dominated trachyte lavas that were laid down during the Pleistocene period. The lavas have significant amounts of carbonate but low calcium and magnesium levels, which has allowed the lake to concentrate into a caustic alkaline brine. These extreme chemical conditions create a harsh environment where only specialized organisms can survive.

The chemical properties of the water are known to calcify the bodies of any living thing that died in the lake.

== Flora ==
The colour of the lake is characteristic of those where very high evaporation rates occur. As water evaporates during the dry season, salinity levels increase to the point that salt-loving microorganisms begin to thrive. Such halophile organisms include some cyanobacteria that make their own food with photosynthesis as plants do. The red accessory photosynthesizing pigment in the cyanobacteria produces the deep reds of the open water of the lake and the orange colours of the shallow parts of the lake. The alkali salt crust on the surface of the lake is also often coloured red or pink by the halophilic microorganisms that live there. Salt marshes and freshwater wetlands around the edges of the lake also support a variety of plants.

== Fauna ==
Most animals find the lake's high temperature (up to 60 °C [140 °F]) and its high and variable salt content inhospitable. Nonetheless, Lake Natron is home to some endemic algae, invertebrates, and birds. In the slightly less salty water around its margins, some fish can also survive.

The lake is the only regular breeding area in East Africa for the 2.5 million lesser flamingoes, whose status of "near threatened" results from their dependence on this one location. When salinity increases, so do cyanobacteria, and the lake can also support more nests. These flamingoes, the single large flock in East Africa, gather along nearby saline lakes to feed on Spirulina (a blue-green algae with red pigments). Lake Natron is a safe breeding location because its caustic environment is a barrier against predators trying to reach their nests on seasonally forming evaporite islands. Greater flamingoes also breed on the mud flats.

The lake has inspired the nature documentary The Crimson Wing: Mystery of the Flamingos by Disneynature, for its close relationship with the Lesser flamingoes as their only regular breeding area.

Two endemic fish species, the alkaline tilapias Alcolapia latilabris and A. ndalalani, also thrive in the waters at the edges of the hot spring inlets. A. alcalica is also present in the lake, but is not endemic.

== Threats and preservation ==
The area around the salt lake is not inhabited but there is some herding and some seasonal cultivation. Threats to the salinity balance from increased siltation influxes will come from more projected logging in Natron watersheds and a planned hydroelectric power plant on the Ewaso Ng'iro across the border in Kenya. Although development plans include constructions of a dike at the north end of the lake to contain the freshwater, the threat of dilution to this breeding ground may still be serious. There is no formal protection.

A new threat to Lake Natron is the proposed development of a soda ash plant on its shores. The plant would pump water from the lake and extract the sodium carbonate to convert to washing powder for export. Accompanying the plant would be housing for over 1000 workers, and a coal-fired power station to provide energy for the plant complex. In addition, there is a possibility the developers may introduce a hybrid brine shrimp to increase the efficiency of extraction.

According to Chris Magin, the RSPB's international officer for Africa, "The chance of the lesser flamingoes continuing to breed in the face of such mayhem are next to zero. This development will leave lesser flamingoes in East Africa facing extinction". Seventy-five percent of the world's lesser flamingoes are born on Lake Natron. Currently a group of more than fifty East African conservation and environmental institutions are running a worldwide campaign to stop the planned construction of the soda ash factory by Tata Chemicals Ltd of Mumbai, India, and National Development Corporation of Tanzania. The group working under the umbrella name Lake Natron Consultative Group is being co-ordinated by Ken Mwathe, Conservation Programme Manager at BirdLife International's Africa Secretariat.

As per communication in June 2008, Tata Chemicals shall not proceed with the Natron Project and further re-examination of this project will be subject to the Ramsar Wetlands plan, which is currently under preparation.

Because of its unique biodiversity, Tanzania named the Lake Natron Basin to the Ramsar List of Wetlands of International Importance on 4 July 2001. The lake is also the World Wildlife Fund East African halophytics ecoregion.

== Visiting the area ==
There are a number of campgrounds near the lake, which is also the base for climbing Ol Doinyo Lengai. Lake Natron has tourist attraction potentials that are important for ecotourism development. However, lack of a general management plan, inadequate funding at the operational level, lack of mechanisms to secure a fair distribution of ecotourism benefits, and poorly developed tourism infrastructural facilities to support diverse segments of tourists were identified as the main challenges associated with the management of ecotourism in the area. The lake can also be accessed from Shompole Conservancy Kenya.

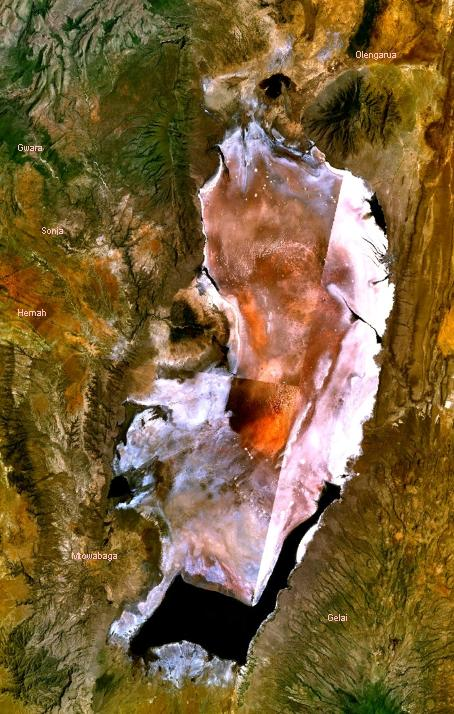
Lake Natron as seen on NASA's World Wind program

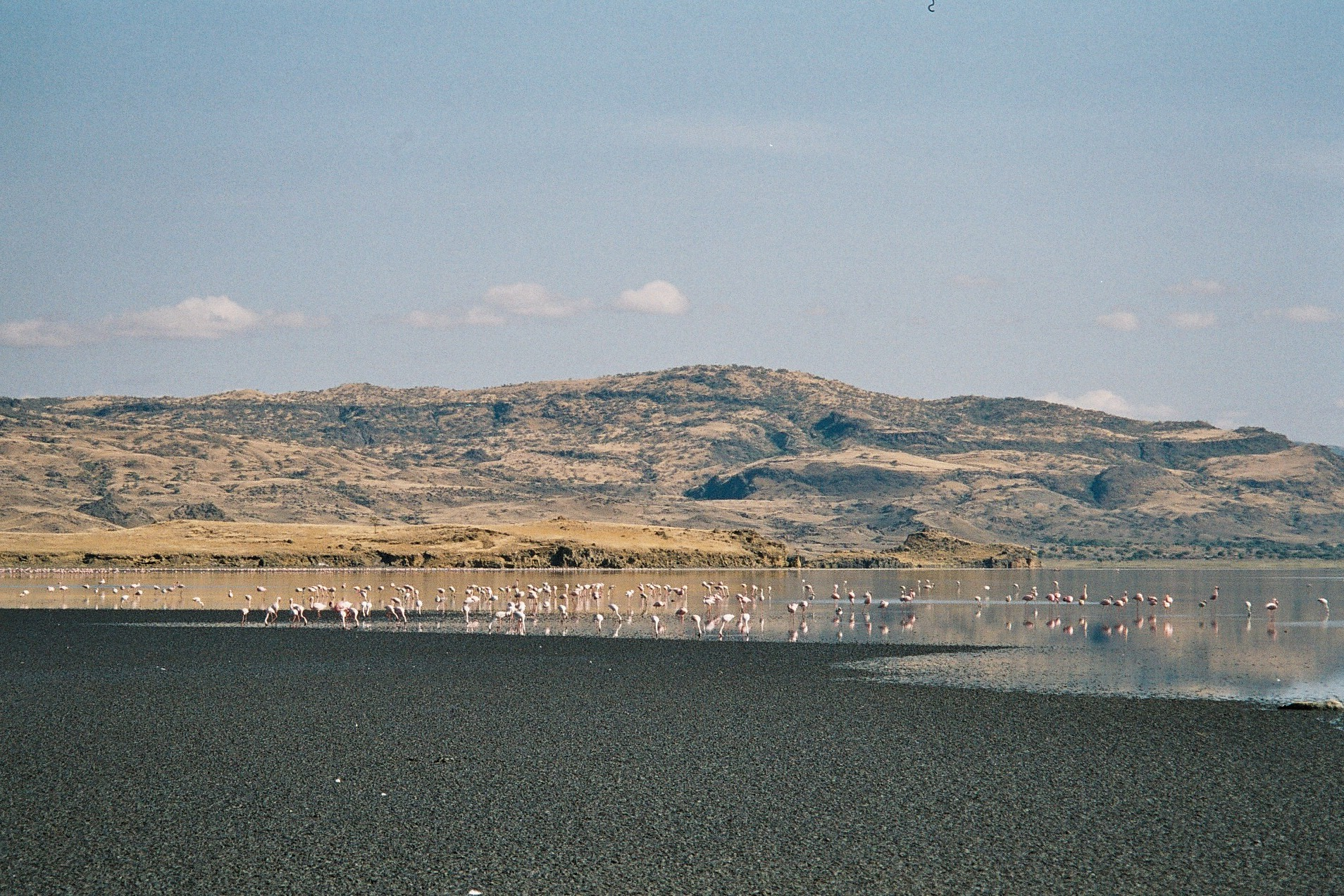
The lake with flamingos

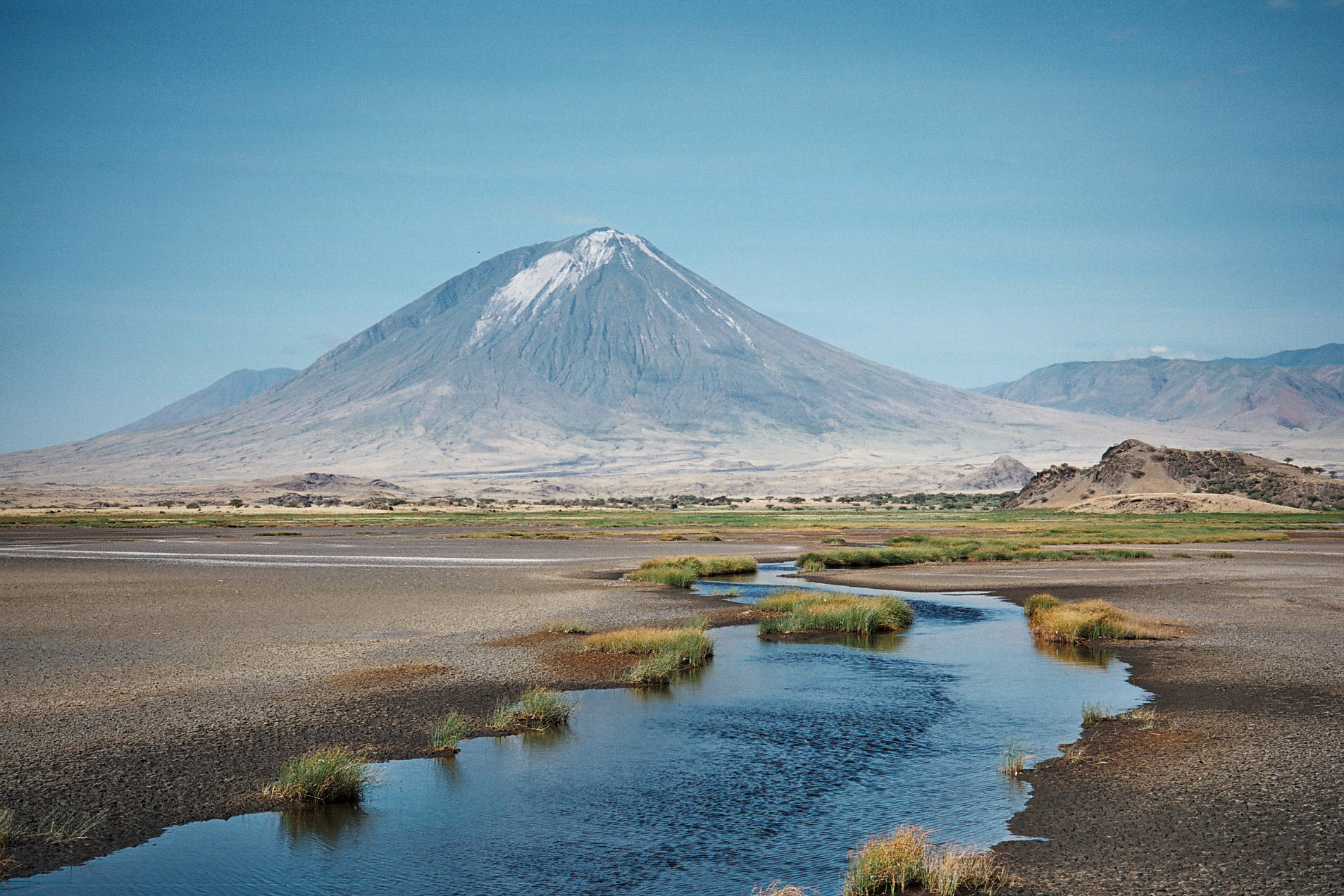
Ol Doinyo Lengai seen from Lake Natron

== See also ==
- Rift Valley lakes
- The Crimson Wing: Mystery of the Flamingos
