= Lake Bogoria =

Meromictic lake in Kenya

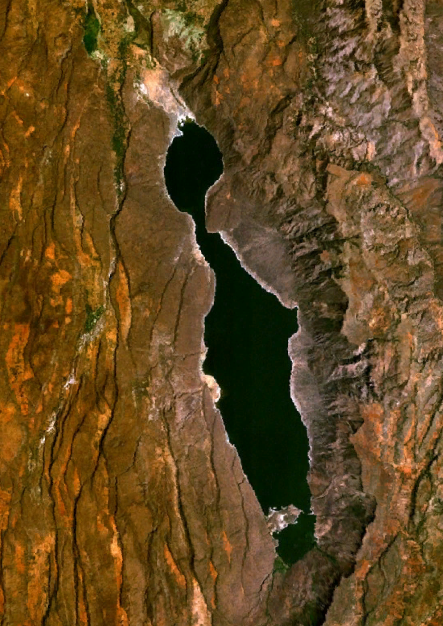
- Satellite image of Lake Bogoria taken from World Wind

- Location within Kenya Location within Africa
- Coordinates: 0°15′N 36°06′E
- Lake type: saline, alkaline, meromictic
- Primary inflows: Sandai and Emsos rivers, springs
- Catchment area: 700 km^{2} (270 sq mi)
- Basin countries: Kenya
- Max. length: 17.6 km (10.9 mi)
- Max. width: 3.6 km (2.2 mi)
- Surface elevation: ~990 m (3,250 ft)

Ramsar Wetland
- Designated: 27 August 2001
- Reference no.: 1097

Lake Bogoria (formerly Lake Hannington) is a saline, alkaline lake that lies in a volcanic region in a half-graben basin south of Lake Baringo, Kenya, a little north of the equator. Lake Bogoria, like Lake Nakuru, Lake Elementeita, and Lake Magadi further south in the Rift Valley, and Lake Logipi to the north, is periodically home to one of the world's largest populations of lesser flamingos. The lake is a Ramsar site and Lake Bogoria National Reserve has been a protected National Reserve since November 29, 1973.

== History ==
The lake was formerly named after Anglican missionary James Hannington who visited in 1885.

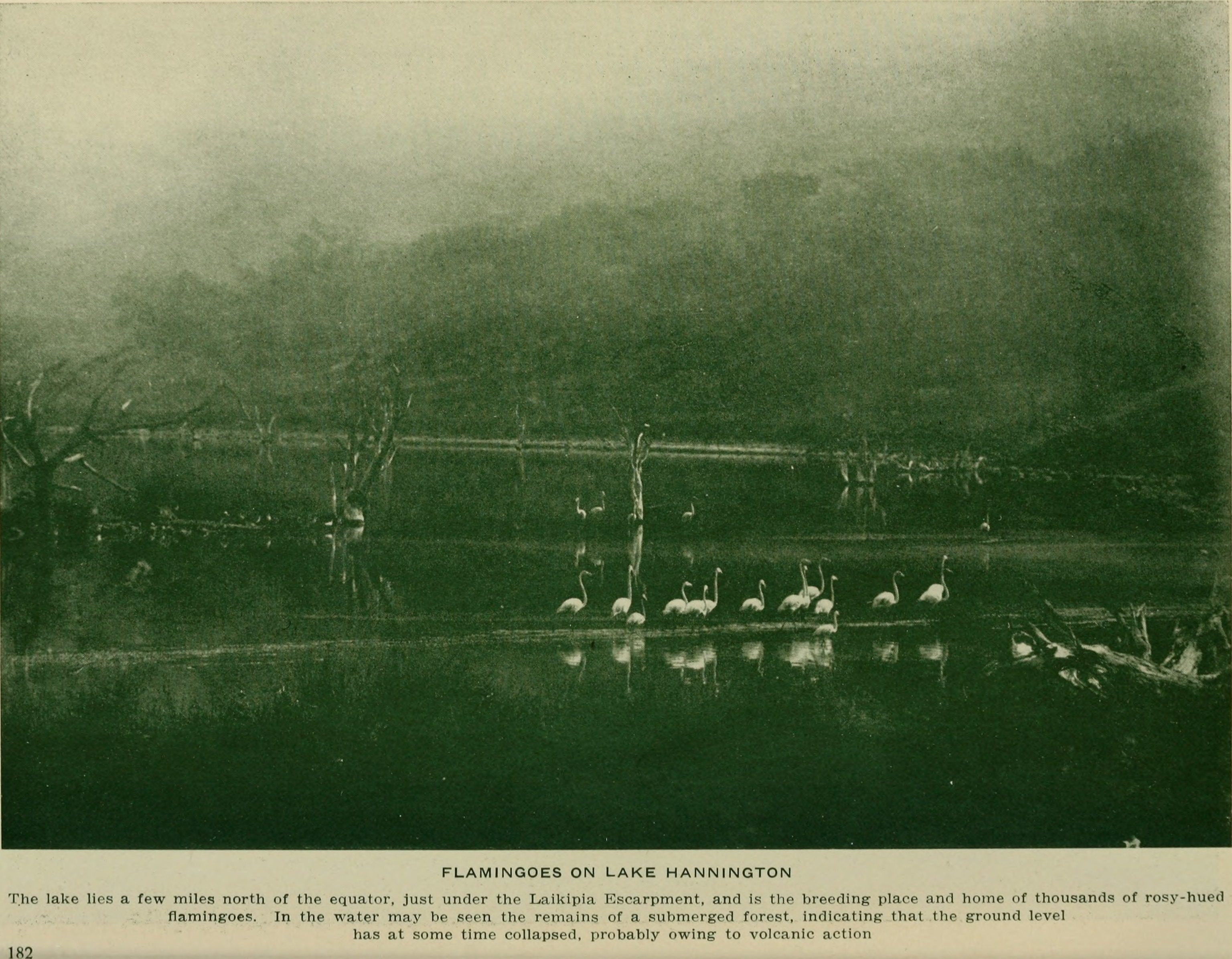
Lake Hannington (early 20th century photo)

== Description ==
Lake Bogoria is located in Baringo County, about 120 km north of Nakuru city and 240 km north of Nairobi. It is in the Gregorian Rift Valley.

It was once part of a larger freshwater lake, joined with the current Lake Baringo.

As shown on the satellite picture at the top of this page, it is divided in three lobes: a large center one and two smaller ones at the north and south extremities. The two narrower areas separating these lobes are shallow, tectonically controlled sills at Nyalibuch and Mwanassis.

There are contradictions regarding its altitude. Unesco's Ramsar gives 963 m (3,159 ft). More precise — and more prudent —, Renaut & Owen 1991 give c. 990 m as of August 1977, but also indicate that the lake's level fluctuates seasonally by 50 to 100 cm; and that it can vary by several meters for short periods, having fluctuated between c. 988 and c. 996 m during the 20th century. Lake-shore terraces around the shoreline, made of coarse angular gravel and angular orthoconglomerates, mark higher lake levels from the Pleistocene and Holocene. They are visible on 45% of the present level, and some are about 9 m above the present shoreline.

In 1991 the maximum length is 17.6 km (10.9 mi) and its width ranges from 0.5 km (0.31 mi) to 3.6 km (2.2 mi).

The drainage basin is 700 km^{2} (270 sq mi). The lowest point of the drainage divide is at 999 m near Loboi village; when the level of the lake reaches that altitude, its waters flow northward in lake Baringo drainage basin.

In 1978 its maximum depth was recorded as 12 m (39 ft) or 11.5 m (38 ft), and Renaut & Owen 1991 precise that this was in the largest sub-basin or lobe; and that the two smaller parts at the north and south extremities were 5.5 m (18 ft) deep at that time. In 2003 its maximum depth is just over 10 m (33 ft) in an area of 3,000 ha (7,400 acres). This is relatively shallow, but nevertheless deeper — and therefore hydrologically more stable — than the other endorheic lakes in Kenya. The Rift Valley lakes undergo regular (and cyclic) changes in water levels mostly in response to precipitation, which is unreliable and unpredictable. In this region, lake Bogoria is the only alkaline lake that has minimal lake water fluctuations, and is used as a refuge for flamigos and other animals when other relatively shallow lakes dry out.

Its surface is generally 3,300 ha (8,200 acres) but this fluctuates, essentially according to the amount of rainfall. Most of the rain falls between April and November, and precipitation ranges average about 700 mm on the Loboi plain and 1200 mm on the adjacent highlands. But El Nino years bring increased rainfall and flooding of the lake shores. For example, in 2020 its area increased to about 4,690 ha (11,600 acres): 2020 was one of the hottest years on record, but despite depressed rainfall in the short-rains season (October to December, or OND) it also saw a wetter than normal January and February because of the strong positive Indian Ocean Dipole index during that period, and enhanced rainfall during the long-rains season (March to May, or MAM) (that year, Lake Victoria rose to a new record level).

However, evaporation rate is above 2500 mm, thus inducing a water deficit and creating semi-arid conditions over most of the lower parts of the Bogoria basin.

=== Wetlands ===
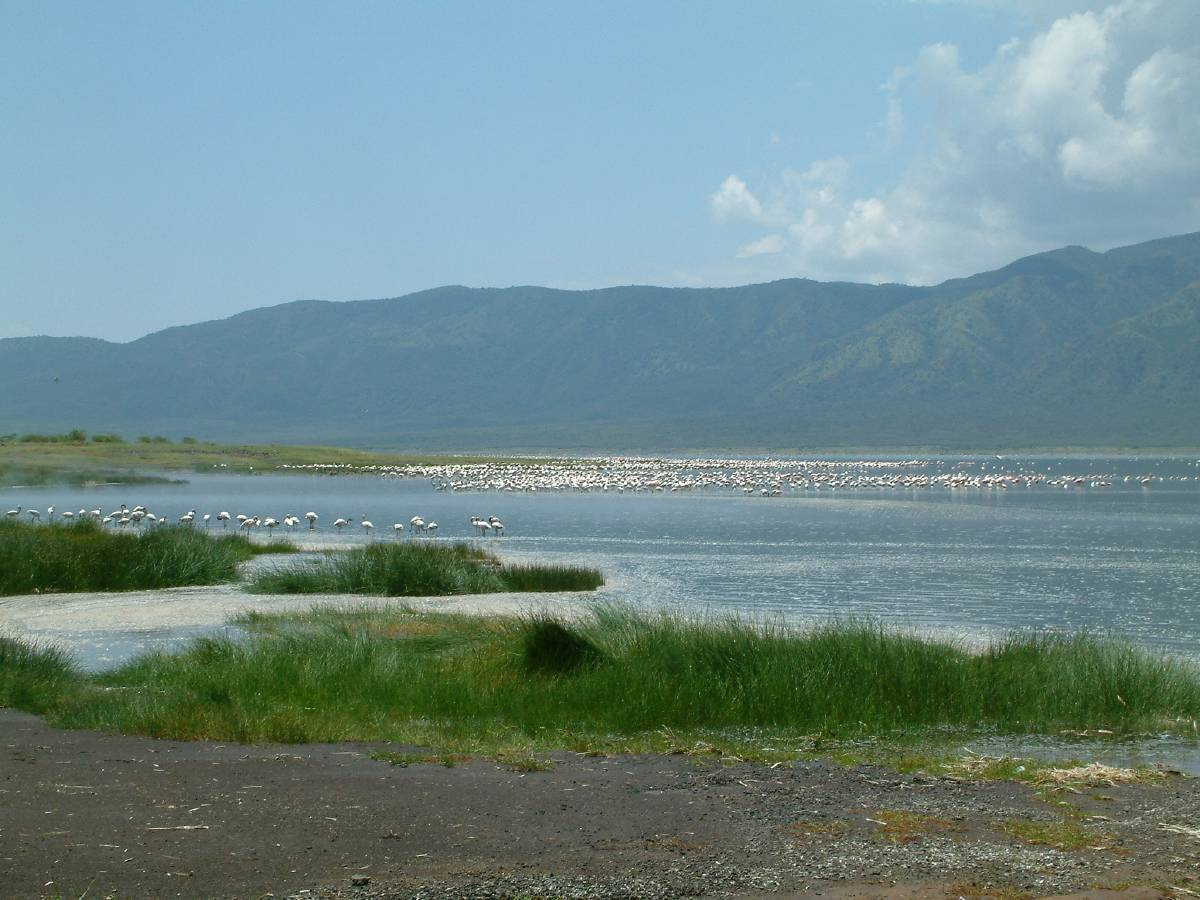
Lake Bogoria

Although the lake is in a semi-arid part of Kenya Rift Valley, it is surrounded by numerous and varied wetlands along its shorelines, along faults where hot, warm and cold springs have developed, and along rivers that run across the rift floor.

==== Types of wetlands ====
Six major types of wetland have been defined around lake Bogoria:

- proximal hot springs, with small streamlets, exposed ground (carbonate and/or siliciclastics), high water temperatures over 40 ◦C that reach up to 99 ◦C at vents, and microbial mats of bacteria and less common diatoms; These are associated with:
  - hot spring marshes, found downstream of the proximal hot springs and adjacent to spring streamlets, and dominated by thick clusters of short reeds, mainly Cyperus laevigatus, that stand through a water layer 2 cm high or less and with temperatures ranging between 30–40 ◦C;
- artesian blister wetlands (Note: For artesian blister wetlands, see Ashley et al. 2002 and Gail Ashley. "Artesian blister wetlands, the intersection of geomorphology and hydrogeology". serc.carleton.edu. Rutgers University, Earth and Planetary Sciences.) associated with cool springs (30–33 ◦C). The circular blister mounds are about 15 m diameter and 1 to 2 m high. They are formed by cool artesian springs that emerge at the surface, creating a sort of water blister of about 1m^{3}.Ashley et al. 2002 They are capped with an arched semi-permeable cover of short graminoids (mostly less than 10 cm high) such as Cyperus laevigatus, Pycreus mundtii and Leersia hexandra. The edges of these 'blister mounds' are dominated by Leersia hexandra mixed with other grasses and sedges. Further around are some Sporobolus spicatus, and downslope of these mounds and of other water seeps are often found small patches of Typha and wet meadows plants.

the graminoid vegetation is interspersed with cyanobacterial and algal mats. Water from the blister mounds, and other seeps and springs, support wet meadows and Typha swamps. The blister mounds and Typha swamps have a more or less neutral pH, low conductivities and total alkalinity.

- Typha and Cyperus papyrus swamps, fed by a mix of surface streams, groundwater seeps or warm springs (25 °C to 30◦C). Where water is shallow and ephemeral, these are dominated by tall Typha domingensis (2 m tall or taller); where water is permanent — usually in broad depressions —, the dominant vegetation is floating Cyperus papyrus;
- floodplain marshes, with seasonal flooding and populated by short grasses;
- hypersaline lake littoral wetlands, found on the lake shores: they are flooded (by more than 10 cm of water), gently sloping, siliciclastic delta margins, often modified by flamingo nesting. Their pH is around 10, with an alkalinity ca. 1000 meq l^{−1}. Hot springs may also feed into some of these sites. There are no macrophytes and few diatoms: cyanobacteria dominate (mainly Spirulina platensis);
- freshwater lake littoral wetlands, forming narrow to extensive fringes around the relatively fresh water Lake Baringo (pH ~8.9, alkalinity ca. 13 meq l^{−1}), dominated by a variety of wetland vegetation.

==== Wetlands areas ====
The marshes to the north of the lake do not feed any river outlet. They are linked to both Lake Bogoria and adjacent Lake Baringo; both lakes are fed by the Waseges river (or Sandai river), the latter bringing a small permanent flow of the diverted Loboi river. These wetlands are fed by ephemeral or perennial streams, and by springs.
In the south, two freshwater springs supply permanent streams. All three (the Wasenge river and the two streams) are used extrensively for drinking, as well as the water from some hot springs streams — some of these being substantially less salty than the lake water. Other streams, such as the Emsos to the south and the Parkirichai to the west, are ephemeral: they flow only after heavy rains.

The Loboi Swamp

This swamp is to the north of the lake. It hugs the base of a horst block (raised fault block bounded by normal faults) oriented north-south. According to radiocarbon datation, it was created only 700 years ago in a former floodplain environment — possibly as a consequence of faulting. In 1969, it spread over 6 km in length; but water was diverted from the Waseges river and by 2001 it was only 3.5 km long and about 0.5 km wide. At least three warm springs, and groundwater inputs, feed it. The Loboi river also contributes to it but that river periodically shifts its bed (avulsions) and that modifies its relative role regarding the swamp. This river is cool and only slightly alkaline. The springs have a similar chemistry but they are warmer, have a higher nitrate content, and are slightly acidic. The resulting waters of the Loboi Swamp are also slightly alkaline, and generally reflect the mixing of fluvial, spring and groundwater inflows.
Its areas of semi-permanent or seasonal standing water are dominated by Typha domingensis and also have some Leersia hexandra, Ipomoea aquatica, and other taxa. These areas surround a wetter area populated by near pure stands of Cyperus papyrus that are rooted or floating in water up to 1.5 m deep. Acacia scrub occurs on an adjacent horst block to the west, with grasses such as Sporobolus spicata on adjacent plains.

The Kesubo floodplain marshes

These are also to the north of the lake, east of the Loboi swamp. They rest at the southern end of an extensive alluvial fan formed by the Sandai river. The Kesubo Floodplain Marshes are seasonally flooded and lie between the rift valley boundary faults, to the east, and a small horst block, to the west. The river waters are slightly alkaline, cool, and have a low total alkalinity. The marshes are similar in their general water chemistry, but are slightly acidic and have a distinctly lower NO3 content. Short grasses are the dominant vegetation type and cattle graze the area.

The Campground Wetlands

These lie near the Lake Bogoria National Reserve entrance, to the south of the Loboi swamp, and at the limit dividing faulted volcanic uplands and colluvial-alluvial sediments. They contain several types of habitats. Ashley et al. 2002 defined them as an 'Artesian Blister Wetland' (see Types of wetlands above), and that wetland also includes slightly acidic, nitrate enriched, warm springs.

The Loburu Delta

This is on the western shore of Lake Bogoria. It is composed of silts and gravels, and shows a variety of fluvial, deltaic, and beach settings. It has active hot springs that feed a series of marshes dominated by Cyperus laevigatus. The springs are alkaline, of the Na-HCO_{3} type, contain a lot of silica and nitrate, and the temperature near the vents is extremely hot (more than 96◦C). The areas immediately adjacent to the vents and in nearby streamlets commonly include microbial mats of Phormidium, Pseudanabaena, Spirulina, Synechococcus and Calothrix, but are devoid of macrophytes.
the Cyperus marshes, which have similar water chemistries, are dominated by short reeds less than 20 cm high. Temperatures range from about 32◦C to about 60◦C near the hot spring streamlets that cross the marshes. There are also algal and cyanobacterial mats. The lake shoreline at Loburu (and other shorelines) does not present many aquatic macrophytes. The lake brine is of Na-CO3-HCO3-Cl composition, with a pH range of 9.3–10.6. Some shallow marginal lagoons have salinities exceeding 100 g l−1. Temperature at the time of sampling ranged between 28 and 33 ◦C, but exceed 60 ◦C at sublacustrine hot spring vents. However, cyanobacteria — mainly Spirulina platensis — are abundant and support up to 2 million flamingoes.

=== Geysers and hot springs ===
Lake Bogoria is in a geothermally active part of the Kenya Rift Valley, and is famous for geysers and hot springs along the bank of the lake and in the lake. There are about 200 hot springs, most of which are distributed along the shoreline. In four locations around the lake can be observed at least 10 geysers, which erupt up to 5 m high. Geyser activity is affected by the fluctuations of lake level, which may inundate or expose some geysers.

Geysers

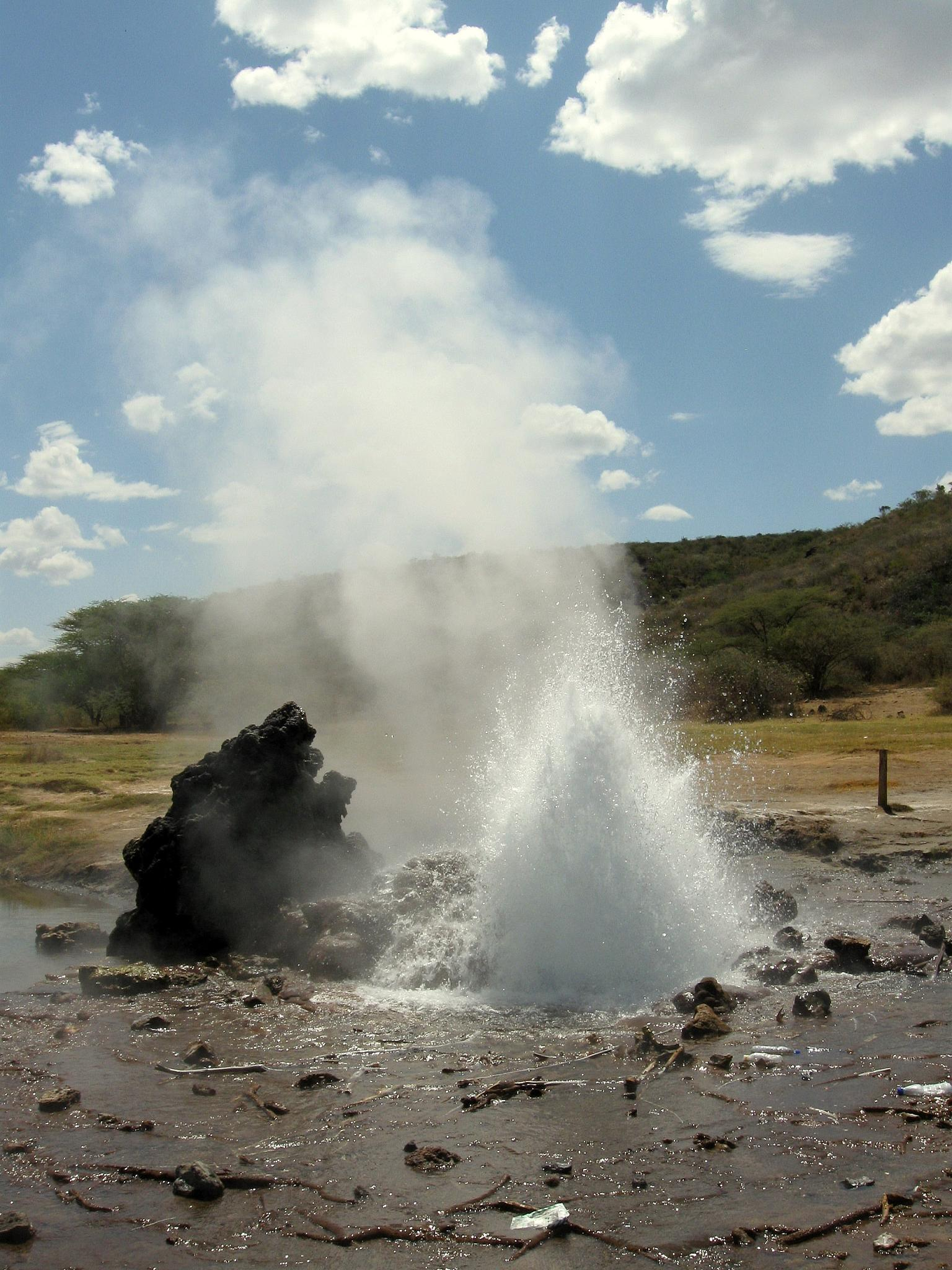

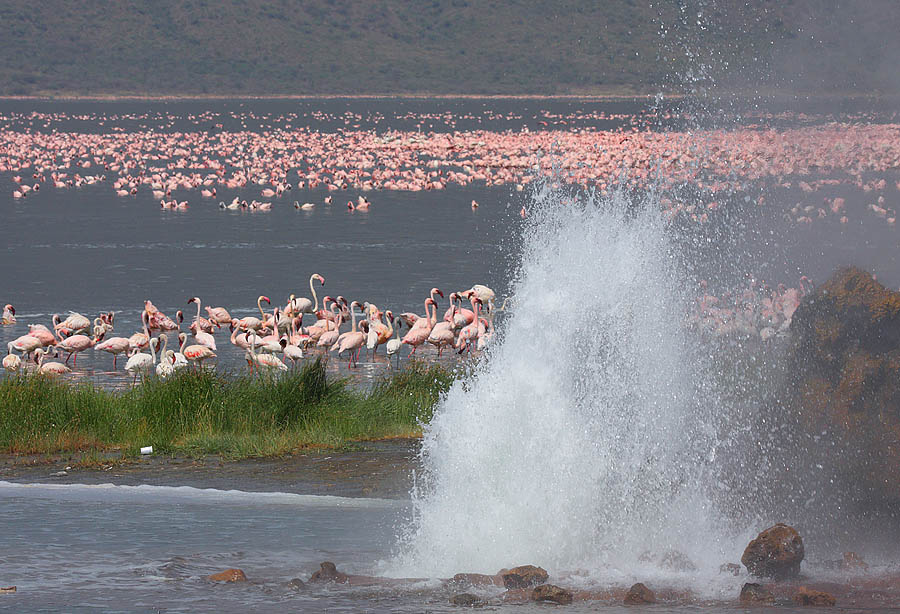

== Geology ==
Lake Bogoria occupies an asymmetric basin approximately 20 km long and 10 km wide, bordered by faults. The east and south borders are marked by a major fault, with steep slopes that prevent wetland development (the Siracho Escarpment, to the east). To the west, trachyphonolites (uncommon extrusive igneous rock) are cut through by numerous gently sloping tilt-blocks; rivers oriented north-south feed delta lobes, where spring-fed wetlands have developed. The north opens on a basin with Quaternary silts, sands and gravels; there, the gently sloping Sandai and Loboi plains gradually rise to a drainage divide that separates lake Bogoria and lake Baringo.

The faults control over 200 hot and cold springs and seeps, which bring a significant water input.

Core analysis of the lake floor has revealed two types of sedimentation: a shallow fan–deltaic clastic zone; and a deeper zone where Organic matters alternate with evaporites. The organic muds were formed during periods of relatively high lake level and high microbial productivity; whereas the evaporites were formed during drier periods. The cores attest of many environmental fluctuations during the past 30 000 years, linked to regional climatic changes and to local tectonic and hydrological conditions.

== Chemistry, hydrology ==
Lake Bogoria is a soda lake: it has no surface outlet, its waters are strongly alkaline (pH:10.5). High salt concentrations are also given (40‰) and this increases when the total amount of water decreases (evapoconcentration). Thus, following an extreme draught from March to October 2009, salt saturation reached 48‰. Soda lakes are highly productive ecosystems.

Its waters contain large concentrations of Na^{+}, HCO_{3}^{−}, CO_{3}^{2−} et Cl^{−} ions. They originate from inflow from the Sandai and Emsos rivers, and from about 200 alkaline hot springs that are present at three onshore sites: Loburu, Chemurkeu, and a southern group (Ng'wasis, Koibobei, Losaramat). Other springs discharge directly from the lake floor. Lake Bogoria also contains the highest concentration of true geysers in Africa (at least 18 have been active in the 35 years before 2008).

The lake is meromictic (stratified) with less dense surface waters lying on a denser more saline bottom waters.

The lake has not always been saline. Sediment cores from the lake floor have shown that freshwater conditions existed for several periods during the past 10,000 years.

Of the ca. 60 hot springs that discharge on Loburu delta plain on the western margin of the lake, travertine appears at 20% of them. Carbonate is actively precipitating at several of these, as shown by calcite-encrusted artefacts. This is unusual, in that this precipitation most probably occurs at temperatures over 80 °C.

The geysers are believed by some to have medicinal value.

== Ecology ==
The terrestrial vegetation that immediately surrounds the lake is mainly a thorny bushland dominated by Acacia, Salvadora, Balanites and Commiphora species. There are also patches of riverine woodland with Ficus capensis, Acacia xanthophloea and Acacia tortilis.

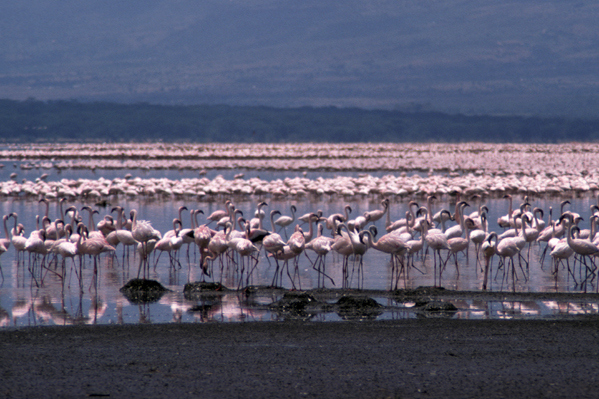
Flamingos nesting on the shoreline of the lake (1988).

=== Phytoplankton ===
One species dominates the phytoplankton: Arthrospira fusiformis, a cyanobacterium spirulina. But all these wetlands see the occurrence of diatoms in at least parts of them; these diatoms vary in diversity, abundance and species composition. The main factors directing these variables are pH, temperature, and specific conductivity; secondary factors are Si and nitrate. Hot springs generally have a low diversity of diatoms, with variable abundance; they commonly include Anomoeoneis sphaerophora var. guntheri, Navicula tenella, Navicula cuspidata, and Nitzschia invisitata. In other wetland types, distinctive diatom floras variously include Fragilaria brevistriata, Gomphonema parvulum, Navicula tenelloides, Nitzschia communis, N. latens, N. sigma, Rhopalodia gibberula, and Stauroneis anceps.

The flamingoes feed on Arthrospira fusiformis. The monogonont rotifer species Brachionus sp. Austria (belonging to the Brachionus plicatilis cryptic species complex) is found in high densities.

A new alkaliphilic purple nonsulfur bacterium was discovered in lake Bogoria; it has been named Rhodobaca bogoriensis.

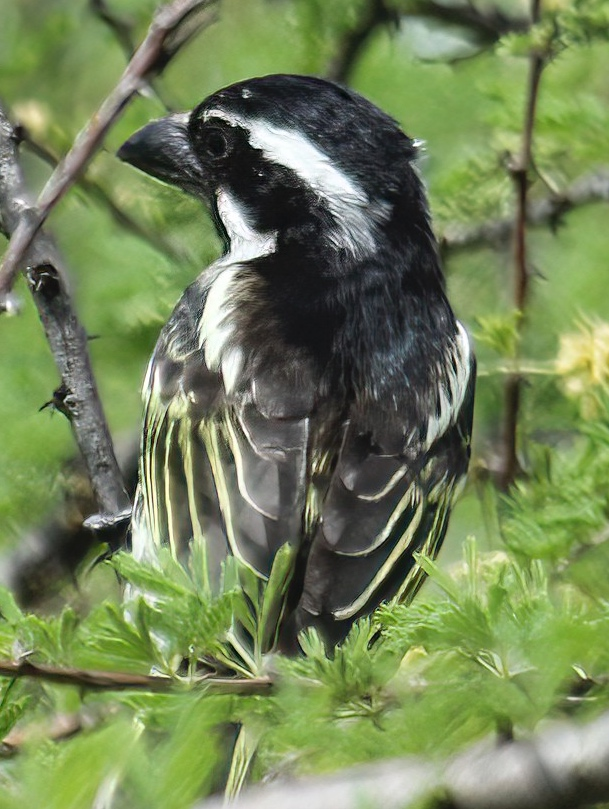
Black-throated barbet

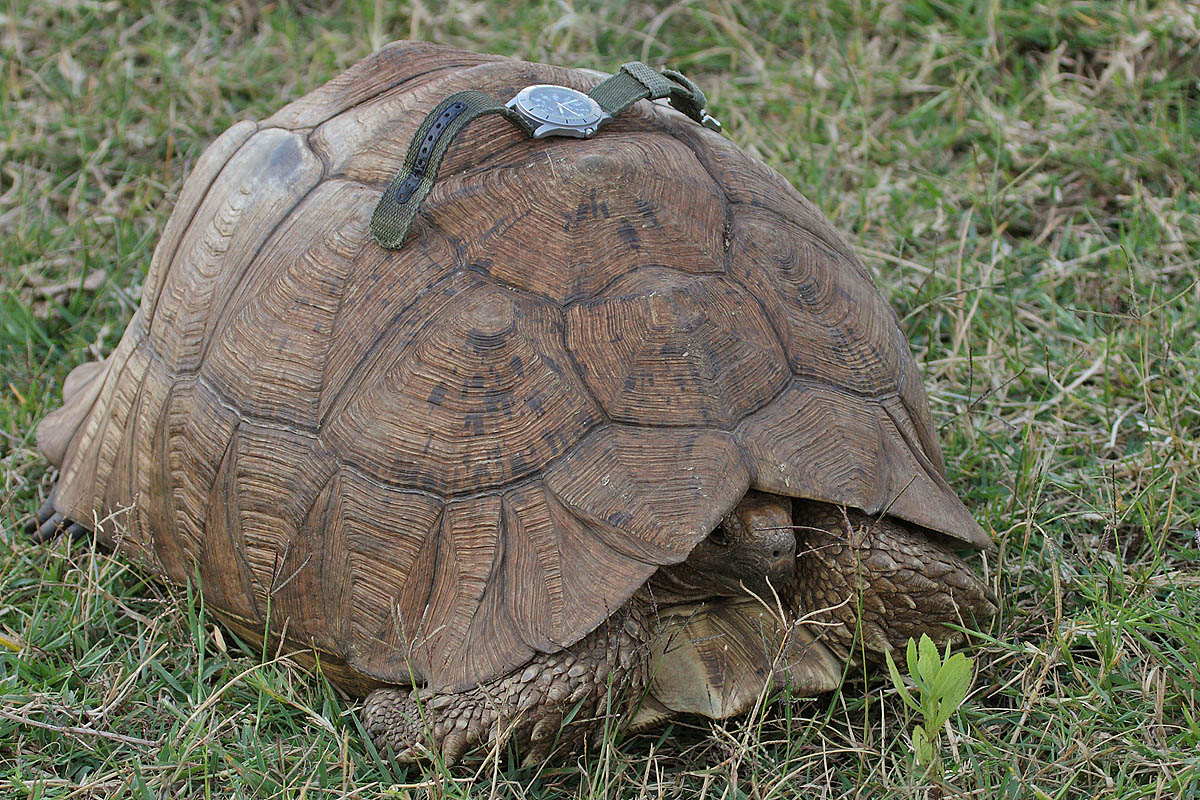
African spurred tortoise

=== Birds ===
The lake supports more than 300 waterbird species. It is an important stopover site for a population of up to 1.5 million migratory birds, notably for the lesser flamingo (Phoeniconaias minor).

In the 1990s, two episodes of mass deaths occurred among flamingos, all starting from Lake Bogoria. The first episode, in 1993–1995, saw about 35,000 flamingos dying between August and November 1993 and about 15,000 dying in August 1995. The second episode occurred in 1999–2000; the number of deaths for 2000 was estimated at around 100,000. In both cases, flamingos were the only water bird species falling victim to this unknown phenomenon. The studies on these events were not conclusive as to the main cause of death. Heavy metal poisoning was suggested but such poisoning does not have a periodic effect: its effect are continuous, and in these cases not compatible with the periodic dying; nor was it coherent with that birds of all ages were concerned, whereas such poisoning affects older individuals more than younger ones (ther older ones have had more time to accumulate poison in their bodies). Food poisoning has also been cited. the main food for lesser flamingo is Spirulina platensis, which is abundantly produced in the lakes of that region; but around the years that saw this heavy mortality toll, there had been an important increase of toxic cyanobacteria, especially during periods of algal blooms; and the symptoms of dying flamingos were similar to those of algal toxicity.

=== Other animals ===
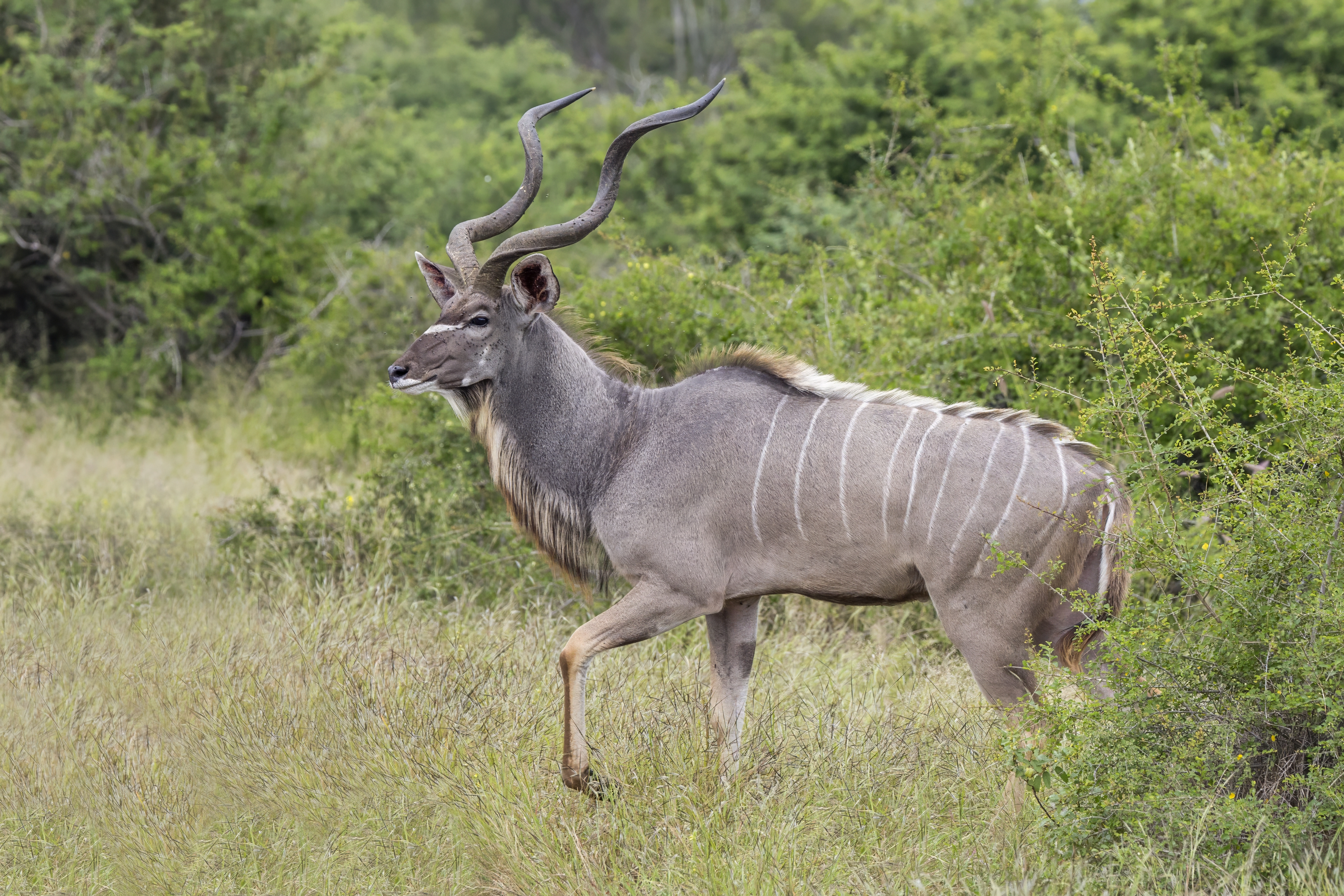
Greater kudu one of the animals at lake bogoria

Its immediate surroundings are a critical habitat for vulnerable species such as the common hippopotamus (Hippopotamus amphibius) and African lion (Panthera leo); another important species is the greater kudu (Tragelaphus strepsiceros). The lake's stable water level makes it doubly important during periods of drought, when water levels in other East African lakes drop.

== Nature protection ==
The Site is a UNESCO World Heritage Site since 2011 and an Important Bird and Biodiversity Area (IBA). The Ramsar site, designated on August 27, 2001, covers the entire National Reserve, with an area of 10,700 ha (26,000 acres), shared between the 3,300 ha lake and 7,400 ha of riparian and terrestrial habitats.

== Human rights: the Endorois people ==
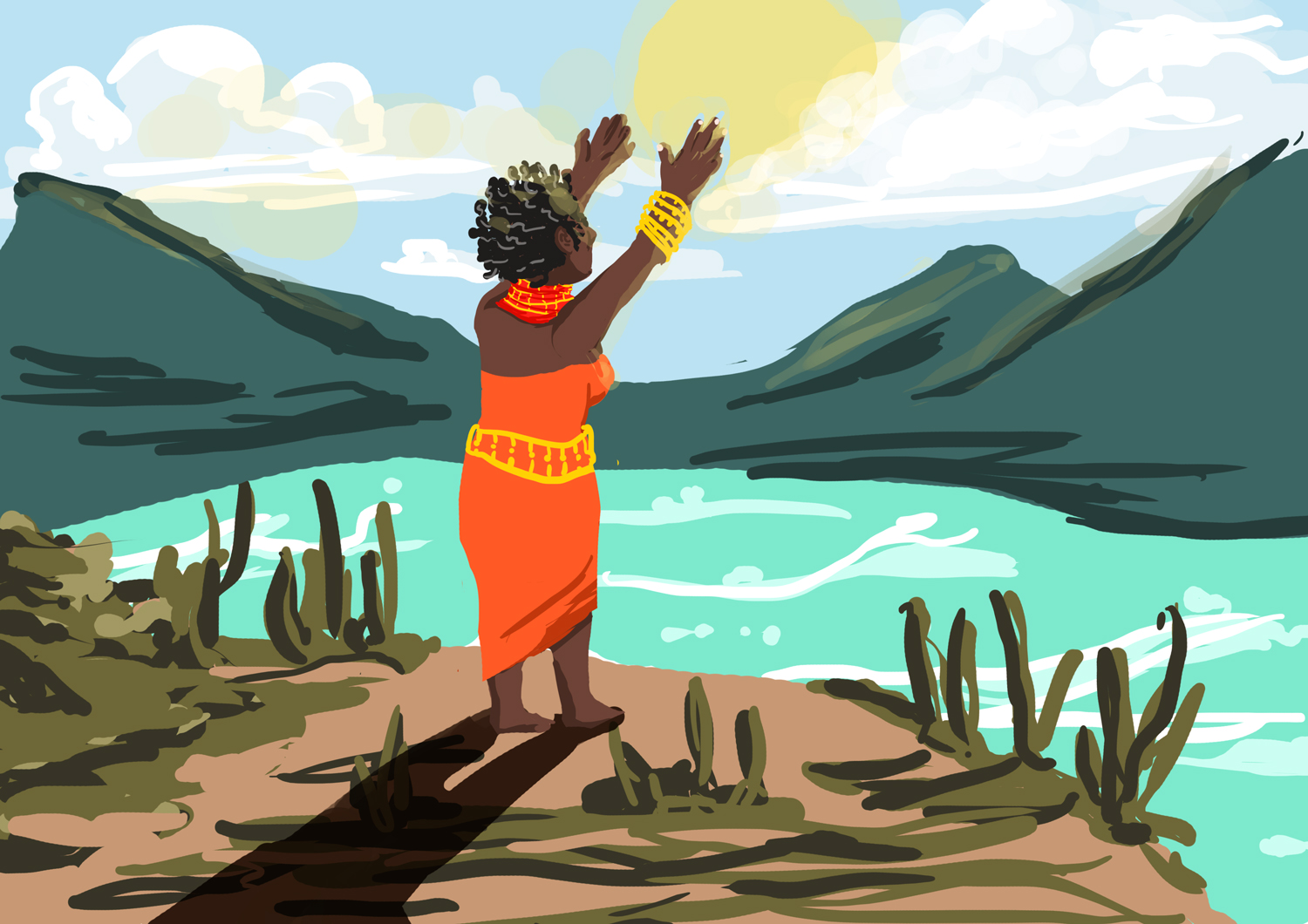
Cheptaleel's Prayer. Contemporary illustration of heroine of Kalenjin folklore

The lake area was the traditional home of the Endorois people, who were forced to leave the area in the 1970s and are now challenging their removal at the African Commission on Human and Peoples' Rights. In 2009 the African Commission on Human and Peoples' Rights (ACHPR) made a landmark ruling, ordering the Kenyan government to restore the Endorois to their historic land, compensate them from losses and sharing with them the profits from the Lake Bogoria game reserve. But in 2022, Minority Rights Group reported that that decision had not yet been implemented and has many Endorois were still consigned to 'severe poverty, illiteracy, poor health and a life of destitution.'
In 2024 the Endorois allied with the Ogiek people — who have themselves been initially evicted in 1920 from their ancestral grounds in the Mau Forest (south-west Kenya) by the British colonial government. In 2017 the Ogiek also won a court case against the Kenian government, whereby the latter was supposed to restitute the Ogiek ancestral land and pay a compensation of 157,000 Kenyan shillings ($1,026) per person. As of 2024, not only the government has so far failed to implement the court's orders as in the case of the Endorois, but has persisted in further evictions imposed in November 2023 by the Kenyan authorities during the visit of Britain's King Charles III.
On 6 February 2024, both ethnies demonstrated together in Nairobi with the support of the International Network for Economic, social and cultural rights to demand the government implement the rulings.

The area is inhabited by Tugen and Jemps pastoralists, and livestock grazing is the main land use in the area.

== Tourism ==
The lake and its surroundings attract 200,000 tourists per year, due to the wildlife, the hot springs, the spectacular cliffs and escarpments and the rich indigenous culture.

Hotel accommodation is available near Loboi village at the north end of the lake. Camping is permitted at the southern end of the lake.

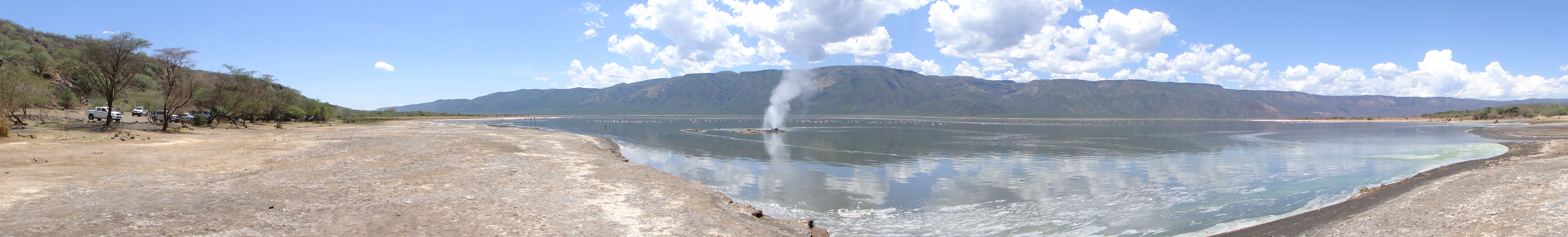
Lake Bogoria panorama: the Loburu delta with proximal hot springs and hot spring marshes

== Related articles ==
- Rift Valley Lakes
- East African Rift
- Rivers of Kenya
- History of the Kalenjin people
- Nilotic settlement in East Africa

== Bibliography ==
- Harper, David M.; Childress, R. Brooks; Harper, Maureen M.; Boar, Rosalind R.; Hickley, Phil; Mills, Suzanne C.; Otieno, Nickson; Drane, Tony; Vareschi, Ekkehard; Nasirwa, Oliver; Mwatha, Wanjiru E.; Darlington, Joanna P.E.C.; Escuté-Gasulla, Xavier (2003). "Aquatic biodiversity and saline lakes: Lake Bogoria National Reserve, Kenya". Hydrobiologia. 500: 259–276.
- Milford, Amy D.; Jung, Deborah O; Madigan, Michael T; Achenbach, Laurie A. (July 2000). "Rhodobaca bogoriensis gen. nov. and sp. nov., an alkaliphilic purple nonsulfur bacterium from African Rift Valley soda lakes". Archives of Microbiology. 174 (1): 18–27. doi:10.1007/s002030000166.
- North Lewis, Marguerita (1998). A Guide to Lake Baringo and Lake Bogoria. Horizon Books. ISBN 9966-868-17-8.
- Owen, R. Bernhart; Renaut, Robin W.; Hover, V.C.; Ashley, G.M.; Muasya, M. (January 2004). "Swamps, springs and diatoms: Wetlands of the semi-arid Bogoria-Baringo Rift, Kenya". Hydrobiologia. 518 (1): 59–78.
- Renaut, Robin W.; Owen, R. Bernhart (1991). "Lake Bogoria". In Anadón, P.; Cabrera, Ll; Kelts, K. R. (eds.). Lacustrine facies analysis. John Wiley & Sons. pp. 175–194. ISBN 0-632-03149-2.
- Renaut, Robin W.; Tiercelin, Jean-Jacques (March 1993). "Lake Bogoria, Kenya: soda, hot springs and about a million flamingoes". Geology Today. 9 (2): 56–61. doi:10.1111/j.1365-2451.1993.tb00981.x.
- Renaut, Robin W.; Tiercelin, Jean-Jacques (1994). "Lake Bogoria, Kenya Rift Valley: a sedimentological overview". In Renaut, Robin W.; Last, William M. (eds.). Sedimentology and Geochemistry of Modern and Ancient Saline Lakes. Society for Sedimentary Geology, Special Publication, vol. 50. pp. 101–123. doi:10.2110/pec.94.50.0101. ISBN 9781565761759.
- Renaut, Robin W.; Owen, R. Bernhart (2005). "The geysers of Lake Bogoria, Kenya Rift Valley, Africa". GOSA Transactions. 9: 4–18.
- Renaut, Robin W.; Owen, R. Bernhart; Jones, Brian; Tiercelin, Jean-Jacques; Tarits, Corinne; Ego, K. John; Konhauser, Kurt O. (February 2013). "Impact of lake-level changes on the formation of thermogene travertine in continental rifts: Evidence from Lake Bogoria, Kenya Rift Valley" (PDF). Sedimentology. 60 (2): 428–468.
- Tiercelin, Jean-Jacques; Vincens, Annie; Barton, C. E. (1987). "Le demi–graben de Baringo–Bogoria, Rift Gregory, Kenya. 30,000 ans d'histoire hydrologique et sédimentaire". Bulletin des Centres de Recherches Exploration-Production Elf-Aquitaine (in French). 11 (2): 249–540. ISSN 0396-2687.
- Tierlin J.J. 1985 Le rift est African vers un nouvel ocean: l'hydrothermalisme marqueur de l'ouverture? Actes 110e Conles nationalize societes sav., 6, 305-316
