= Lake Bogoria National Reserve =

Nature reserve in Kenya

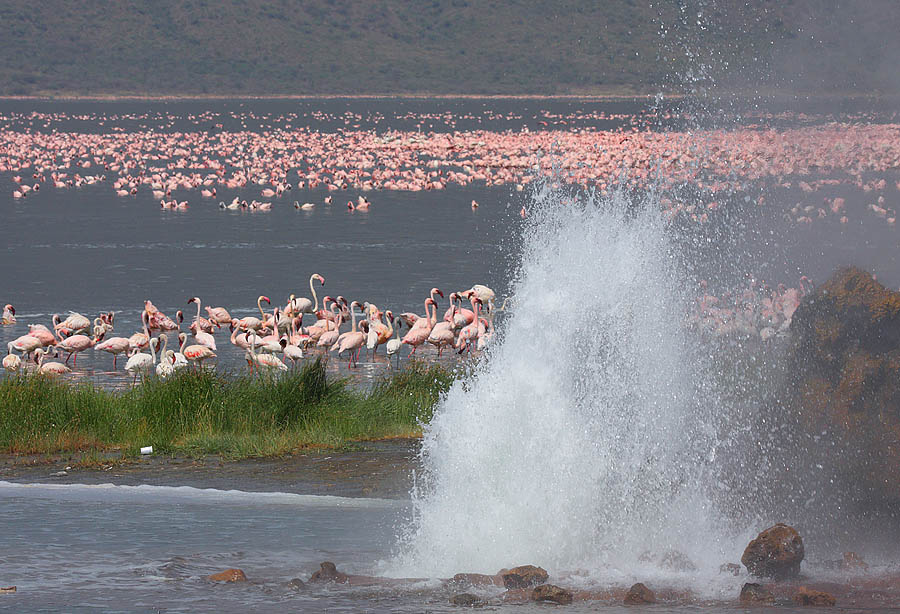
- Flamingos and geyser at Lake Bogoria

- Location within Kenya
- Location: Rift Valley Province, Kenya
- Coordinates: 0°15′N 36°06′E
- Area: 107 square kilometres (41 sq mi)
- Established: November 1970
- Governing body: Kenya Wildlife Service

Lake Bogoria National Reserve is in the Great Rift Valley, Kenya, covering Lake Bogoria and the land immediately surrounding the lake. It is administered by the Kenya Wildlife Service.

== Location ==
The lake lies in a trough below the Ngendelel Escarpment, a sheer wall 600 metres (2,000 ft) high. The lake covers 32 square kilometres (12 sq mi). It is geothermically active on the western shore, with geysers and hot springs. The geologist J.W. Gregory described the lake in 1892 as "the most beautiful view in Africa".

The reserve is in a semi-arid area. The only major river feeding the lake is the Waseges River, which rises on the northern slopes of the Aberdare Range. The Waseges runs through productive agricultural land higher up, through bush and scrub used for grazing, and then through very dry bush before entering the lake at its northern end. The lake is surrounded by grasslands dotted with bushes. There is acacia-ficus woodland to the south, and the north merges into a papyrus swamp.

The park was opened in November 1970. Facilities for tourists include the park lodge, three public campsites and one privately operated campsite. Visitors may also bathe in the hot springs, which form a natural spa. The reserve was submitted as a candidate for World Heritage Site in 1999.

== Ecology ==
The lake is alkaline, feeding blue-green algae which in turn feed flamingoes. At times the number of flamingoes feeding in the lake may be as high as two million. Raptors such as tawny eagles prey on the flamingoes. In total, 135 species of bird have been recorded. They include little grebe, pratincole, swift, little bee-eater, cape wigeon, yellow-billed stork, African spoonbill, augur buzzard, gabar goshawk, water dikkop, great tit, starling, hornbill and crombec.

The reserve has a herd of the relatively uncommon Greater Kudu. Other large mammals include buffalo, zebra, cheetah, baboon, warthog, caracal, spotted hyena, impala and dik-dik.

The Waseges flows through regions of intensive coffee cultivation where heavy use is made of chemical fertilizers and pesticides, which may be polluting the lake. Many visitors are attracted to the hot springs on the western lakeshore, and these cause pollution from solid wastes. Siltation is another threat to biodiversity.

== Sources ==
- "Lake Bogoria National Reserve". AfricaPoint. Archived from the original on 2011-12-22.
- "Lake Bogoria National Reserve". Kenya Wildlife Service. Archived from the original on 2011-11-28.
- "Lake Bogoria National Reserve and Lake Kamnarok National Reserve". ThinkQuest. Archived from the original on 2014-03-12.
- "Lake Bogoria National Reserve". UNESCO.
- Williams, Lizzie (2005). Africa overland. Struik. ISBN 1-77007-187-3.
