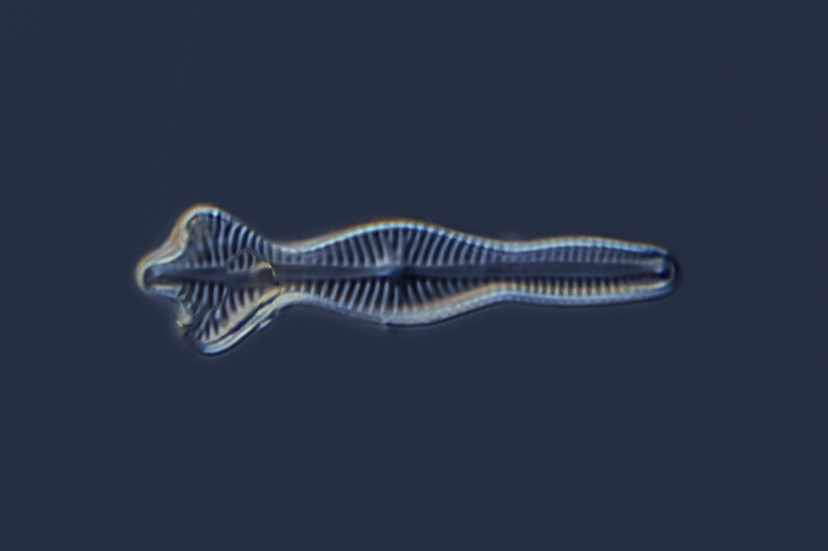
- Diatom Gomphonema

Scientific classification
- Domain: Eukaryota
- Clade: Diaphoretickes
- Clade: Sar
- Clade: Stramenopiles
- Phylum: Gyrista
- Subphylum: Ochrophytina
- Class: Bacillariophyceae
- Order: Cymbellales
- Family: Gomphonemataceae
- Genus: Gomphonema; C.G.Ehrenberg, 1832

= Gomphonema =

Genus of algae

Gomphonema is a genus of diatoms belonging to the family Gomphonemataceae.

The genus has cosmopolitan distribution.

== Species ==
As accepted by WoRMS;

- Gomphonema acceptatum Levkov, Mitic-Kopanja & E.Reichardt, 2016
- Gomphonema acuminatum Ehrenberg, 1832
- Gomphonema adhikarii C.Radhakrishnan, Sudipta K.Das, Kociolek et B.Karthick in Radhakrishnan et al., 2020
- Gomphonema affine Kützing, 1844
- Gomphonema africanum G.S.West, 1907
- Gomphonema alavariense C. Delgado, S. Blanco, L. Gonzalez-Paz & S.F.P. Almeida in Gonzalez-Paz et al., 2020
- Gomphonema angkoricum Cejudo-Figueiras, S.Blanco & Ãlvarez-Blanco, 2012
- Gomphonema angusticapitatum Levkov, Mitic-Kopanja & E.Reichardt, 2016
- Gomphonema angusticlavatum Levkov, Mitic-Kopanja & E.Reichardt, 2016
- Gomphonema angustissimum F.Hustedt
- Gomphonema angustum C.Agardh, 1831
- Gomphonema anjae Lange-Bertalot & Reichardt
- Gomphonema asiaticum Liu & Kociolek, 2013
- Gomphonema augur Ehrenberg, 1840
- Gomphonema auguriforme Levkov, Mitic-Kopanja, Wetzel & Ector in Levkov, Mitic-Kopanja & E.Reichardt, 2016
- Gomphonema auritum A.Braun ex Kützing, 1849
- Gomphonema balatonis Pantocsek
- Gomphonema berggreni
- Gomphonema berggrenii Cleve
- Gomphonema bergii Skvortzov & Meyer
- Gomphonema bicepiformis Wei Zhang & Kociolek, 2018
- Gomphonema bigutianchnensis Y.Li in Liao & Y.Li, 2018
- Gomphonema bohemicum Reichelt & Fricke, 1902
- Gomphonema boreale E.V.Østrup
- Gomphonema brasiliensoide Metzeltin, Lange-Bertalot & García-Rodríguez, 2005
- Gomphonema bukycanyona L.N.Bukhtiyarova, 2013
- Gomphonema californicum Stancheva & Kociolek, 2016
- Gomphonema candelariae J.Frenguelli
- Gomphonema cantalicum J.-J.Brun & Héribaud-Joseph
- Gomphonema capitatum Ehrenberg, 1838
- Gomphonema capitoccultum Reichardt
- Gomphonema capsulare J.A.Ress, E.W.Thomas & Kociolek, 2016
- Gomphonema carolinense Hagelstein, 1939
- Gomphonema catarinensis G.Krasske, 1948
- Gomphonema changyangicum Li, Shi & Lei, 1999
- Gomphonema charcotii M.Peragallo
- Gomphonema chemeron Jeff.R.Stone, Westover & Kociolek
- Gomphonema chinense Liu & Kociolek, 2013
- Gomphonema clavatoides H.P.Gandhi, 1960
- Gomphonema clavatuloides Rimet, D.G. Mann, Trobajo et N. Abarca in Rimet et al., 2018
- Gomphonema clavatum Ehrenberg, 1832
- Gomphonema clerici Frenguelli, 1923
- Gomphonema clevei Fricke, 1902
- Gomphonema confusum Levkov, Mitic-Kopanja & E.Reichardt, 2016
- Gomphonema correntinum Frenguelli, 1933
- Gomphonema dalatica Glushchenko, Kulikovskiy & Kociolek, 2017
- Gomphonema darwinii L.L.Bahls, 2014
- Gomphonema delicatula Skvortzov, 1937
- Gomphonema dharwarensis H.P.Gandhi, 1956
- Gomphonema dichotiforme Z.X.Shi, 2004
- Gomphonema difformum B.Karthick & J.P.Kociolek, 2011
- Gomphonema diminutum B.Karthick & J.P.Kociolek, 2011
- Gomphonema dirangense S.K.Das, C.Radhakrishnan, Kociolek & B.Karthick, 2018
- Gomphonema distincte-striatum Kociolek, J. P. & Woodward, J.
- Gomphonema dojranense Levkov, Mitic-Kopanja & E.Reichardt, 2016
- Gomphonema doonense B.Karthick, R.Nautiyal & Kociolek, 2015
- Gomphonema dubravicense Pantocsek
- Gomphonema eileencoxiae (Bahls, 2017) Bahls, C.E.Wetzel & Ector, 2018
- Gomphonema elegantissimum E.Reichardt & H.Lange-Bertalot, 2011
- Gomphonema elongatum W.Smith, 1855
- Gomphonema eriensioides Kulikovskiy, Kociolek & Solak in Kociolek et al., 2018
- Gomphonema evolutionense L.L.Bahls, 2014
- Gomphonema frequentiformis (Metzeltin & Krammer) C.E.Wetzel & F.F.Almeida in Almeida et al., 2020
- Gomphonema frickei O.Müller, 1905
- Gomphonema gallaudi Héribaud-Joseph
- Gomphonema gandhii B.Karthick & J.P.Kociolek, 2011
- Gomphonema gautieriforme D.Mitic-Kopanja, C.E.Wetzel, L.Ector & Z. Levkov, 2014
- Gomphonema genestoermeri Liu & Kociolek, 2013
- Gomphonema graciledictum E.Reichardt, 2015
- Gomphonema grande B. Karthick, Kociolek, J.C. Taylor & Cocquyt, 2016
- Gomphonema gregarium J.P Kociolek & Jeff Woodward, 2016
- Gomphonema hedinii Hustedt, 1922
- Gomphonema heideni F.Fricke
- Gomphonema helveticum Brun, 1895
- Gomphonema himalayaense Jüttner in Jüttner et al., 2018
- Gomphonema hinziae Levkov, Mitic-Kopanja & E.Reichardt, 2016
- Gomphonema hristovskii Levkov, Mitic-Kopanja & E.Reichardt, 2016
- Gomphonema hubeicum Li, Shi & Lei, 1999
- Gomphonema idsbense Levkov, Mitic-Kopanja & E.Reichardt, 2016
- Gomphonema indistinctum Kociolek, J. P. & Woodward, J.
- Gomphonema innata Skvortzov, 1937
- Gomphonema insigne Gregory, 1856
- Gomphonema insuetum Kociolek in Kociolek et al., 2014
- Gomphonema insularum Kociolek, J. P. & Woodward, J.
- Gomphonema interruptum J.YChen & H.Z.Zhu, 1994
- Gomphonema intricatoides You & Kociolek, 2015
- Gomphonema intricatum Kützing, 1844
- Gomphonema italicum Kützing, 1844
- Gomphonema jablanicense Levkov, Mitic-Kopanja & E.Reichardt, 2016
- Gomphonema jahniana Kulikovskiy, Kociolek & Solak in Kociolek et al., 2018
- Gomphonema johnsonii L.Bahls, 2013
- Gomphonema juettnerii B.Karthick, R.Nautiyal & Kociolek, 2015
- Gomphonema juriljii Levkov, Mitic-Kopanja & E.Reichardt, 2016
- Gomphonema kalahariense Jeff.R.Stone & Kociolek
- Gomphonema kallarense Pardhi et al., 2020
- Gomphonema kaznakowi K.S.Mereschkowsky
- Gomphonema kerguelenensis E.E.Manguin, 1954
- Gomphonema kezlyae Pardhi et al., 2020
- Gomphonema kociolekii R.Jahn & N.Abarca
- Gomphonema kozufense Levkov, Mitic-Kopanja & E.Reichardt, 2016
- Gomphonema lacifrigidum M.Kulikovskiy, J.P.Kociolek & Solak in Kociolek & Guiry, 2018
- Gomphonema lacusrankala Gandhi, 1958
- Gomphonema lacusrankaloides B.Karthick & J.P.Kociolek, 2012
- Gomphonema lacus-victoriense E.Reichardt, 2007
- Gomphonema lagerheimei A.Cleve, 1895
- Gomphonema lagerheimii A.Cleve, 1895
- Gomphonema lapponicum (A.Cleve) Cleve-Euler
- Gomphonema latelanceolatum Levkov, Mitic-Kopanja & E.Reichardt, 2016
- Gomphonema lateripunctatum Reichardt & Lange-Bertalot, 1991
- Gomphonema liebscheri E.Reichardt, 2012
- Gomphonema longiceps Ehrenberg, 1854
- Gomphonema lujanensis E.Reichardt & N.Maidana, 2008
- Gomphonema lychnidum Levkov, Mitic-Kopanja & E.Reichardt, 2016
- Gomphonema magniaqua M.Kulikovskiy, J.P.Kociolek & Solak in Kociolek & Guiry, 2018
- Gomphonema magnifica H.P.Gandhi
- Gomphonema mariovense Levkov & Tofilovska in Levkov, Mitic-Kopanja & E.Reichardt, 2016
- Gomphonema martini F.Fricke
- Gomphonema matanensis D. Kapustin, Kociolek & Kulikovskiy in Kociolek et al., 2018
- Gomphonema mayamae S.K.Das, C.Radhakrishnan, Kociolek & B.Karthick, 2018
- Gomphonema megalobrebissonii D.A.Chudaev, J.P.Kociolek & M.A.Golobova, 2014
- Gomphonema meridionale J.P.Kociolek & E.W.Thomas, 2009
- Gomphonema metzeltinii You & Kociolek, 2015
- Gomphonema microcapitatum Kulikovskiy, Kociolek & Solak, 2018
- Gomphonema microlanceolatum You & Kociolek, 2015
- Gomphonema microlaticollum Kulikovskiy, Kociolek & Solak, 2018
- Gomphonema micropus Kützing, 1844
- Gomphonema minusculum Krasske
- Gomphonema minutum (C.Agardh) C.Agardh, 1831
- Gomphonema modicum Levkov, Mitic-Kopanja & E.Reichardt, 2016
- Gomphonema moniliforme Gandhi, 1960
- Gomphonema mutunensis Ruwer, Ludwig & Rodrigues, 2019
- Gomphonema nagpurense Sarode & Kamat, 1984
- Gomphonema navicelloides Frenguelli, 1942
- Gomphonema naviculoides W. Smith, 1856
- Gomphonema neotropicum N.Abarca & D.Mora
- Gomphonema nesophilum Kociolek, J. P. & Woodward, J.
- Gomphonema obesoccultum Reichardt
- Gomphonema occidentale
- Gomphonema olivaceum (Lyngbye) Desmazières, 1825
- Gomphonema oregonicum Ehrenberg
- Gomphonema oxycephalum Cleve
- Gomphonema paracapitatum Kulikovskiy, Kociolek & Solak, 2018
- Gomphonema paradaphnoides Cejudo-Figueiras, S.Blanco & Ãlvarez-Blanco, 2012
- Gomphonema paraexilissimum Levkov, Mitic-Kopanja & E.Reichardt, 2016
- Gomphonema parapygmaeum Jüttner & Kociolek in Jüttner et al., 2018
- Gomphonema parasundaense Jüttner in Jüttner et al., 2018
- Gomphonema paratergestinum Levkov, Mitic-Kopanja & E.Reichardt, 2016
- Gomphonema parvicapitatum Kociolek in Kociolek et al., 2014
- Gomphonema parvuliforme Levkov, Mitic-Kopanja & E.Reichardt, 2016
- Gomphonema parvulum (Kützing) Kützing, 1849
- Gomphonema pelisteriense Levkov, Mitic-Kopanja & E.Reichardt, 2016
- Gomphonema preliciae Levkov, Mitic-Kopanja & E. Reichardt, 2016
- Gomphonema prespanense Levkov, Mitic-Kopanja & E.Reichardt, 2016
- Gomphonema prowsei Glushchenko, Kulikovskiy & Kociolek, 2017
- Gomphonema pseudacuminatum Kulikovskiy, Kociolek & Solak, 2015
- Gomphonema pseudaffine Levkov, Mitic-Kopanja & E.Reichardt, 2016
- Gomphonema pseudoparvulum Kociolek, J. P. & Woodward, J.
- Gomphonema puiggarianum
- Gomphonema pusillum (Grunow, 1880) Kulikovskiy & Kociolek, 2018
- Gomphonema pygmaeoides You & Kociolek, 2015
- Gomphonema qingyiensis L-X. Zhang, P. Yu & Q-M. You in Zhang et al., 2020
- Gomphonema raraense Jüttner & S.Gurung in Jüttner et al., 2018
- Gomphonema reediae Levkov, Mitic-Kopanja & E.Reichardt, 2016
- Gomphonema resendei A.R.Moura
- Gomphonema rexlowei Liu & Kociolek, 2013
- Gomphonema rhombicum Fricke, 1904
- Gomphonema rimetiana Kulikovskiy, Kociolek & Solak in Kociolek et al., 2018
- Gomphonema ristovskae Levkov & Tofilovska in Levkov, Mitic-Kopanja & E.Reichardt, 2016
- Gomphonema rostellatum (Kützing) G.L.Rabenhorst
- Gomphonema russicum Kulikovskiy, Kociolek & Solak in Kociolek et al., 2018
- Gomphonema saparense S.K.Das, C.Radhakrishnan, Kociolek & B.Karthick, 2018
- Gomphonema saravathense Gandhi, 1970
- Gomphonema scardicum D.Mitic-Kopanja, C.E.Wetzel, L.Ector & Z.Levkov, 2014
- Gomphonema semiapertum Grunow, 1880
- Gomphonema shanghaiensis Zhang & Kociolek, 2016
- Gomphonema shiwania Y.Liu, Kulikovskiy & Kociolek in Zhang et al., 2020
- Gomphonema sichuanenesis Y.Li & J.P.Kociolek, 2010
- Gomphonema sichuanensis Li & Kociolek in Li et al., 2010
- Gomphonema sierrianum Stancheva & Kociolek, 2016
- Gomphonema sphaerophorum Ehrenberg, 1845
- Gomphonema spicula Gandhi, 1958
- Gomphonema spiculoides H.P.Gandhi
- Gomphonema spirkovskae Levkov & Mitic-Kopanja in Levkov, Mitic-Kopanja & E.Reichardt, 2016
- Gomphonema stauroneiforme Grunow
- Gomphonema staurophorum (Pantocsek) Cleve-Euler, 1955
- Gomphonema subapicatum F.E.Fritsch & M.F.Rich
- Gomphonema subclavatum (Grunow) Grunow, 1884
- Gomphonema subinsigniforme L.Ge, Y.Liu & J.P.Kociolek, 2014
- Gomphonema sublaticollum Levkov, Mitic-Kopanja & E.Reichardt, 2016
- Gomphonema submalayense Gandhi, 1970
- Gomphonema subnaviculoides Levkov, Mitic-Kopanja & E.Reichardt, 2016
- Gomphonema subodhii Jüttner & S.Gurung in Jüttner et al., 2018
- Gomphonema subramosum C.A.Agardh
- Gomphonema subtile Ehrenberg, 1843
- Gomphonema svalbardense E.Pinseel, K.Kopalová & Van der Vijver, 2014
- Gomphonema tamilense B.Karthick & J.P.Kociolek, 2012
- Gomphonema tenoccultum Reichardt
- Gomphonema tenuis Gandhi, 1960
- Gomphonema tergestinum (Grunow in Van Heurck) Fricke, 1902
- Gomphonema truncatum Ehrenberg, 1832
- Gomphonema tumens Kociolek & Stoermer, 1991
- Gomphonema turgidum Ehrenberg, 1854
- Gomphonema undulans I.Ãlvarez-Blanco, C.Cejudo-Figueiras & S.Blanco, 2013
- Gomphonema validum Cleve, 1894
- Gomphonema vardarense Levkov, Mitic-Kopanja & E.Reichardt, 2016
- Gomphonema variabilis A.Jurilj, 1957
- Gomphonema varioreduncum Jüttner, Ector, E. Reichardt, Van de Vijver & E.J.Cox, 2013
- Gomphonema vastum F.Hustedt
- Gomphonema ventricosum Gregory, 1856
- Gomphonema vibrio Ehrenberg, 1843
- Gomphonema vidarbhense Sarode & Kamat, 1984
- Gomphonema williamsii Kociolek & Liu, 2013
- Gomphonema witkowskii Kociolek & Liu, 2013
- Gomphonema wuyiensis W.Zhang & Kociolek in Zhang et al., 2018
- Gomphonema xiantaoicum Z.X.Shi & N.Li in Z.X.Shi, 2014
- Gomphonema xinjiangianum You & Kociolek, 2015
- Gomphonema yangtzensis Li in Li, Gong, Xie & Shen, 2006
- Gomphonema yaominae Li, 2012
- Gomphonema yberiense Frenguelli, 1933
- Gomphonema yunnaniana Y.Liu et Kociolek in Liu et al., 2020

== Fossils ==
Several species are fossils.

- Gomphonema jianghanense Y.L.Li, Z.J.Gong, P.Xie & J.Shen, 2007 †
- Gomphonema jianghanensis Li, Gong, Xie & Shen, 2007 †
- Gomphonema jilinense Huang in Huang et al., 1983 †
