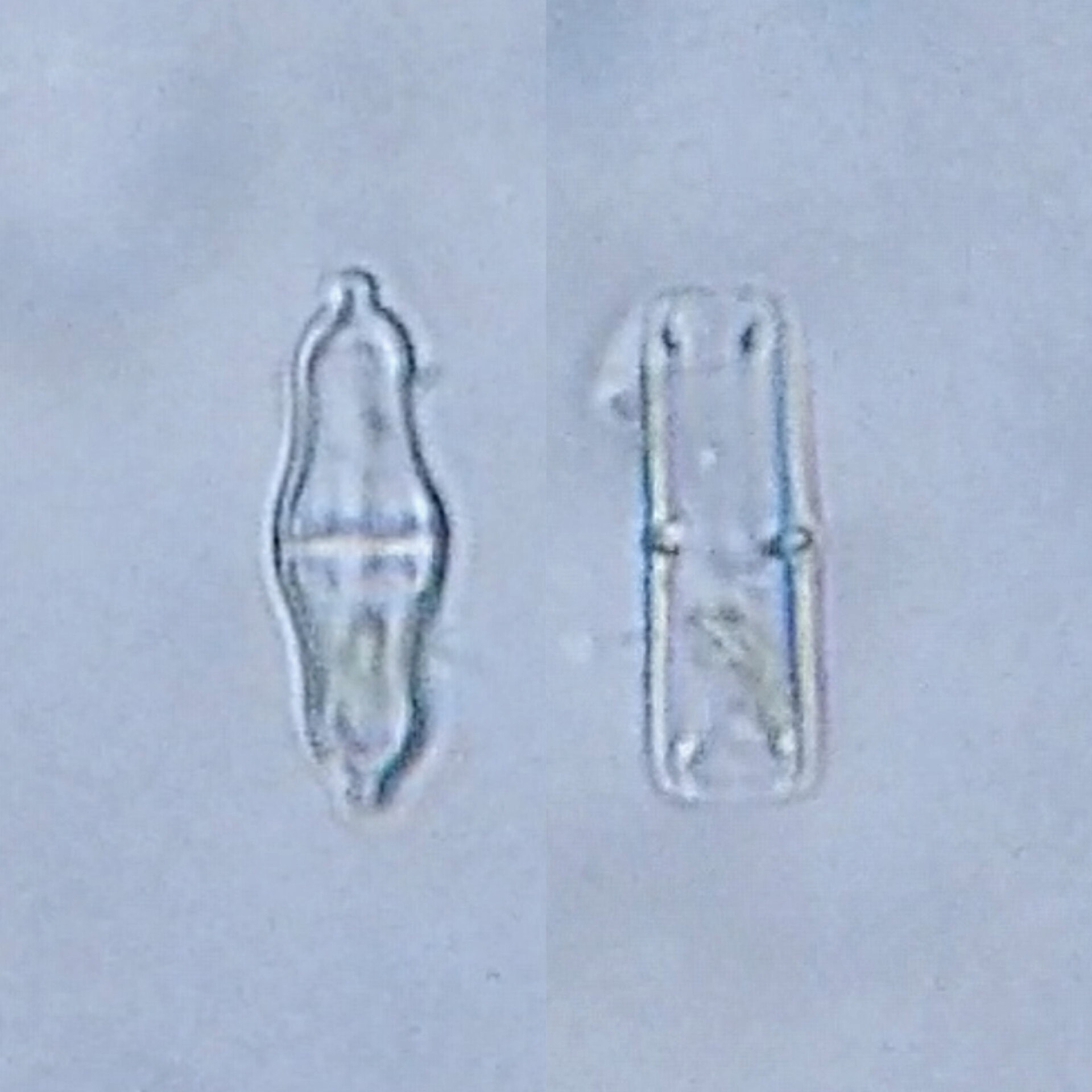
- Stauroneis smithii

Scientific classification
- Domain: Eukaryota
- Supergroup: Stramenopiles
- Division: Ochrophyta
- Clade: Bacillariophyta
- Class: Bacillariophyceae
- Order: Mastogloiales
- Family: Stauroneidaceae
- Genus: Stauroneis; Ehrenberg, 1843

Type species
- Stauroneis phoenicenteron (Nitzsch) Ehrenberg

Species
- Almost 600, See below

= Stauroneis =

Genus of diatoms

Stauroneis is a genus of diatoms (Bacillariophyta) with species that occur in fresh and marine water.

== Subtaxa ==
Species, forms and varieties include:

- Stauroneis abbottii Chlonoky & G.G.Claus
  - Stauroneis abbottii f. curta Compère
- Stauroneis absaroka Bahls
- Stauroneis accedens Lange-Bertalot, Cavacini, Tagliaventi & Alfinito
- Stauroneis achnanthoides A.Cleve
- Stauroneis acidobionta Lange-Bertalot & Wydrzycka
- Stauroneis acidoclinata Lange-Bertalot & Werum
- Stauroneis acidoclinatopsis Van de Vijver & Lange-Bertalot
- Stauroneis acidojarensis Zidarova, Kopalová & Van de Vijver
- Stauroneis acuta W.Smith
  - Stauroneis acuta f. inflata (Frenguelli) Hustedt
  - Stauroneis acuta f. tenuis Schaarschmidt
  - Stauroneis acuta var. americana H.Heiden
  - Stauroneis acuta var. densestriata Østrup
  - Stauroneis acuta var. tenuis E.A.Gonzalves & H.P.Gandhi
  - Stauroneis acuta var. tenuis f. thermalis J.Thomas & E.A.Gonzalves
  - Stauroneis acuta var. undulata Cleve
- Stauroneis acutissima Mann
- Stauroneis acutiuscula M.Peragallo & Héribaud-Joseph
- Stauroneis adamsiana Metzeltin, Lange-Bertalot & García-Rodríguez
- Stauroneis aerophila J.B.Petersen
- Stauroneis aethiopica Ehrenberg
- Stauroneis aethiopum Ehrenberg
- Stauroneis africana Cleve
- Stauroneis africana Amossé
  - Stauroneis africana var. acuminata Grunow
- Stauroneis agrestiformis Van de Vijver, Ledeganck & Lange-Bertalot
- Stauroneis agrestis J.B.Petersen
  - Stauroneis agrestis var. inflata H.Kobayasi & K.Ando
- Stauroneis akamina Bahls
- Stauroneis akrosoensis Foged
- Stauroneis alpina Hustedt
  - Stauroneis alpina var. cuneata Messikommer
- Stauroneis altaica Vozzhennikova
- Stauroneis americana H.Heiden
- Stauroneis amica Lange-Bertalot, Cavacini, Tagliaventi & Alfinito
- Stauroneis amicula Lange-Bertalot, Cavacini, Tagliaventi & Alfinito
- Stauroneis amphiacantha Ehrenberg
- Stauroneis amphibia Lange-Bertalot, Cavacini, Tagliaventi & Alfinito
- Stauroneis amphicephala Kützing
- Stauroneis amphicephaloides Metzeltin & Lange-Bertalot
- Stauroneis amphirhynchus Ehrenberg
- Stauroneis amphisbaena Ehrenberg
- Stauroneis amplipora Lange-Bertalot, Cavacini, Tagliaventi & Alfinito
- Stauroneis anceps Ehrenberg
  - Stauroneis anceps f. capitata H.P.Gandhi
  - Stauroneis anceps f. crassa Østrup
  - Stauroneis anceps f. elliptica Rabenhorst
  - Stauroneis anceps f. elongata Cleve
  - Stauroneis anceps f. extrema A.Mayer
  - Stauroneis anceps f. fossilis (Cleve) Hustedt
  - Stauroneis anceps f. gracilis Rabenhorst
  - Stauroneis anceps f. indica H.P.Gandhi
  - Stauroneis anceps f. intermedia J.Schaarschmidt
  - Stauroneis anceps f. langirostris (H.Kobayasi) H.Kobayasi & K.Ando
  - Stauroneis anceps f. lata Font.
  - Stauroneis anceps f. lata Fontell
  - Stauroneis anceps f. linearis Rabenhorst
  - Stauroneis anceps f. major Pantocsek & P.Greguss
  - Stauroneis anceps f. maxima Istvanfy
  - Stauroneis anceps f. minor Héribaud-Joseph
  - Stauroneis anceps f. obtusa (Grunow) Hustedt
  - Stauroneis anceps f. producta E.A.Gonzalves & H.P.Gandhi
  - Stauroneis anceps f. robusta Foged
  - Stauroneis anceps f. subcapitata Østrup
  - Stauroneis anceps f. tenuicollis Schaarschmidt
  - Stauroneis anceps var. abnormis Frenguelli
  - Stauroneis anceps var. affinis Van Heurck
  - Stauroneis anceps var. alaskana Foged
  - Stauroneis anceps var. amphicephala Kützing
    - Stauroneis anceps var. amphicephala f. elongata (Cleve) Ant.Mayer
    - Stauroneis anceps var. amphicephala f. extrema Ant.Mayer
  - Stauroneis anceps var. amphilepta Markov
  - Stauroneis anceps var. ampliata Frenguelli
  - Stauroneis anceps var. anceps Ehrenberg
  - Stauroneis anceps var. arctica R.M.Patrick & L.R.Freese
  - Stauroneis anceps var. argentina (Cleve) Cleve
  - Stauroneis anceps var. asiatica Skvortzov
  - Stauroneis anceps var. baikalensis Skvortzov
  - Stauroneis anceps var. birostris (Ehrenberg) Cleve
  - Stauroneis anceps var. constricta Manguin
  - Stauroneis anceps var. crassa Østrup
  - Stauroneis anceps var. derasa Grunow
  - Stauroneis anceps var. elliptica Østrup
  - Stauroneis anceps var. elliptica J.-J.Brun
  - Stauroneis anceps var. elliptica Unknown authority
  - Stauroneis anceps var. elongata Cleve
  - Stauroneis anceps var. fennica A.Cleve
  - Stauroneis anceps var. gallica (M.Peragallo & Héribaud) A.Cleve
  - Stauroneis anceps var. genuina Ant.Mayer
  - Stauroneis anceps var. hankensis Skvortzov
  - Stauroneis anceps var. hinganica Skvortzov
  - Stauroneis anceps var. hustedtii H.P.Gandhi
  - Stauroneis anceps var. javanica Hustedt
  - Stauroneis anceps var. lanceolata Cleve
  - Stauroneis anceps var. lata Ant.Mayer
  - Stauroneis anceps var. lata F.E.Fritsch & M.F.Rich
  - Stauroneis anceps var. lata West
  - Stauroneis anceps var. leiostauron A.Cleve
  - Stauroneis anceps var. linearis (Ehrenberg) J.-J.Brun
  - Stauroneis anceps var. longirostris H.Kobayasi
  - Stauroneis anceps var. oblonga Skvortzov
  - Stauroneis anceps var. orientalis Skvortzov
  - Stauroneis anceps var. producta Lagerstedt
  - Stauroneis anceps var. prominula Grunow
  - Stauroneis anceps var. pusilla A.Cleve
  - Stauroneis anceps var. recta Cleve
  - Stauroneis anceps var. rhomboidalis Mayer
  - Stauroneis anceps var. semiaperta Manguin
  - Stauroneis anceps var. subrostrata E.E.Gaiser & J.Johansen
  - Stauroneis anceps var. undulata P.Pero
  - Stauroneis anceps var. ussuriensis Skvortzov
- Stauroneis ancepsfallax Bahls
- Stauroneis ancepsopsis Lange-Bertalot, Cavacini, Tagliaventi & Alfinito
- Stauroneis ancestralis K.S.Mereschkowsky
- Stauroneis angulare E.A.Gonzalves & H.P.Gandhi
- Stauroneis angulata C.Johnston
- Stauroneis angusta Ehrenberg
- Stauroneis angustevittata Reichardt
- Stauroneis angustilancea Lange-Bertalot & Metzeltin
- Stauroneis antadiluviana Héribaud-Joseph
- Stauroneis arctica Hustedt
- Stauroneis arctorussica Van de Vijver & Lange-Bertalot
- Stauroneis atacamae Hustedt
  - Stauroneis atacamae f. major Frenguelli
  - Stauroneis atacamai var. fuegensis A.Cleve
- Stauroneis atlantica Ehrenberg
- Stauroneis attenuirostris R.M.Patrick & Freese
- Stauroneis aueri (Krasske) Lange-Bertalot
- Stauroneis australis Greville
- Stauroneis australobtusa Zidarova, Kopalová & Van de Vijver
- Stauroneis baccata G.Leuduger-Fortmorel
- Stauroneis baikalensis Skvortzow [Skvortsov]
- Stauroneis baileyi Ehrenberg
- Stauroneis balatonis Pantocsek
- Stauroneis barrowiana R.M.Patrick & Freese
- Stauroneis bathurstensis M.H.Giffen
- Stauroneis beeskovea Bahls
- Stauroneis beltranii Metzeltin, Lange-Bertalot & García-Rodríguez
- Stauroneis bertrandii Van de Vijver & Lange-Bertalot
- Stauroneis beyensii Van de Vijver & Lange-Bertalot
- Stauroneis bicuneata Metzeltin & Lange-Bertalot
- Stauroneis bifissa Østrup
- Stauroneis binodis Ehrenberg
- Stauroneis biundulata A.Cleve
- Stauroneis blanda Metzeltin & Lange-Bertalot
- Stauroneis blazenciciae Levkov, Tofilovska, Jovanovska, Cvetkoska & Metzeltin
- Stauroneis bolonensis Barinova
- Stauroneis borgei Manguin
- Stauroneis borrichii (J.B.Petersen) J.W.G.Lund
  - Stauroneis borrichii var. subcapitata (J.B.Petersen) J.W.G.Lund
- Stauroneis boryana Pantocsek
- Stauroneis bottnica A.Cleve
- Stauroneis boudetii M.Persoon
- Stauroneis bovbjergii Reimer
- Stauroneis boyntoniae Bahls
- Stauroneis brasiliensis Metzeltin & H-Lange-Bertalot
- Stauroneis brebissonii F.S.Castracane degli Antelminelli
- Stauroneis brevirostris Ehrenberg
- Stauroneis brevis (Dippel) Metzeltin & Lange-Bertalot
- Stauroneis bryocola Van de Vijver & Lange-Bertalot
- Stauroneis bulla J.R.Carter & P.Denny
- Stauroneis calcuttensis Skvortzov
- Stauroneis capensis Ehrenberg
- Stauroneis capitata (Ehrenberg) Kützing
- Stauroneis capula J.R.Carter & P.Denny
- Stauroneis carinata H.Heiden
- Stauroneis cataractae Gerd Moser
- Stauroneis catharinae Van de Vijver & Lange-Bertalot
- Stauroneis catharinella Van de Vijver & Lange-Bertalot
- Stauroneis cavalcantei Tremarin, Tusset & T.Ludwig
- Stauroneis charcotii M.Peragallo
- Stauroneis charlesreimeri Lange-Bertalot & Metzeltin
- Stauroneis charrua Metzeltin, Lange-Bertalot & García-Rodríguez
- Stauroneis chasei Cholnoky
- Stauroneis chilensis Frenguelli
- Stauroneis chinensis Skvortzow [Skvortzov]
  - Stauroneis chilensis f. elliptica Frenguelli
- Stauroneis cimbebasiae Cholnoky
- Stauroneis circumborealis Lange-Bertalot & Krammer
- Stauroneis circumborealoides Van de Vijver & Lange-Bertalot
- Stauroneis claasseniae Cholnoky
- Stauroneis clandestina Lange-Bertalot & Van de Vijver
- Stauroneis clarkii Bahls
- Stauroneis concapta B.J.Chlonoky
- Stauroneis conspicua Metzeltin & Lange-Bertalot
- Stauroneis constricta Cleve
- Stauroneis constricta Ehrenberg
- Stauroneis cornuta G.Leuduger-Fortmorel
- Stauroneis correntina Frenguelli
- Stauroneis costaricana Metzeltin & Lange-Bertalot
- Stauroneis costata O'Meara
- Stauroneis crassula Van de Vijver & Lange-Bertalot
- Stauroneis crumenifera A.Mayer
- Stauroneis cuneata Manguin
- Stauroneis dahomensis Hustedt
- Stauroneis dakariensis Guermeur
- Stauroneis decora Greville
- Stauroneis decurrens Ehrenberg
- Stauroneis delicata Zidarova, Kopalová & Van de Vijver
- Stauroneis delicatula G.Leuduger-Fortmorel
- Stauroneis demdrobates (Ehrenberg) Ralfs
- Stauroneis demerarae Cleve
- Stauroneis dendrobates (Ehrenberg) Ralfs
- Stauroneis densestriata Hustedt
- Stauroneis deperdita Manguin
- Stauroneis desiderata Cleve
  - Stauroneis desiderata f. rostrata Kisselev
- Stauroneis dicephala Ehrenberg
- Stauroneis didacta J.R.Carter & P.Denny
- Stauroneis dilatata Ehrenberg
  - Stauroneis dilatata f. baicalensis Skvortzov & K.I.Mey.
  - Stauroneis dilatata var. minutissima Manguin
- Stauroneis distinguenda Hustedt
  - Stauroneis distinguenda var. capitata Krasske
  - Stauroneis distinguenda var. ventricosa Krasske
- Stauroneis dorsiventralis Kulikovskiy, Metzeltin & Lange-Bertalot
- Stauroneis dracomontana Cholnoky
- Stauroneis dubia W.Gregory
- Stauroneis dubitabilior Metzeltin & Lange-Bertalot
- Stauroneis edgarii Kociolek
- Stauroneis ehrenbergii Ralfs
- Stauroneis eichhornii J.Schumann
- Stauroneis elegantula Østrup
- Stauroneis elenae Kulikovskiy, Lange-Bertalot & A.Witkowski
- Stauroneis elisa Lange-Bertalot, Cavacini, Tagliaventi & Alfinito
- Stauroneis emorsa Pantocsek
- Stauroneis engelbrechtii Cholnoky
- Stauroneis erythraea Grunow
- Stauroneis euglypta Ehrenberg
- Stauroneis eurysoma (Ehrenberg) Ehrenberg
- Stauroneis eurysoma Ehrenberg
- Stauroneis excellens J.A.M.Perty
- Stauroneis exilissima M.H.Giffen
- Stauroneis explicata J.A.M.Perty
- Stauroneis fenestra Ehrenberg
  - Stauroneis fenestra var. amphirhynchus P.Petit
- Stauroneis finlandia Bahls
- Stauroneis flexuosa M.M.Salah
- Stauroneis fluminea R.M.Patrick & Freese
  - Stauroneis fluminea var. alaskaensis Foged
- Stauroneis fluminopsis Van de Vijver & Lange-Bertalot
- Stauroneis folium Ehrenberg
- Stauroneis fonticola Hustedt
- Stauroneis francisci-josefi Van de Vijver & Lange-Bertalot
- Stauroneis franconica A.Mayer
- Stauroneis frauenfeldiana (Grunow) Cleve
- Stauroneis frickei H.Heiden
  - Stauroneis frickei var. angusta C.S.Boyer
- Stauroneis fridericiana Lange-Bertalot
- Stauroneis fuegiana Casa & Van de Vijver
- Stauroneis fulmen Brightwell
  - Stauroneis fulmen var. capitata Heiden
- Stauroneis fusiformis K.E.Lohman & G.W.Andrews
- Stauroneis gaiserae Metzeltin & Lange-Bertalot
- Stauroneis galapagica Ehrenberg
- Stauroneis gallica M.Peragallo & Héribaud-Joseph
- Stauroneis gelida Van de Vijver & Lange-Bertalot
- Stauroneis gibbosa Ehrenberg
- Stauroneis gieskesii Cholnoky
- Stauroneis glacialis F.S.Castracane degli Antelminelli
- Stauroneis glacialis H.Heiden
- Stauroneis glangeaudii Héribaud-Joseph
- Stauroneis gossmanniae Metzeltin & Lange-Bertalot
- Stauroneis graciliopsis Metzeltin & Lange-Bertalot
- Stauroneis gracilior E.Reichardt
- Stauroneis gracilis Ehrenberg
  - Stauroneis gracilis f. bicapitellata A.Cleve
  - Stauroneis gracilis var. argentina Cleve
  - Stauroneis gracilis var. argentina Cleve
- Stauroneis gracillima Hustedt
- Stauroneis grani E.G.Jørgensen
- Stauroneis granulata (Ehrenberg) Ralfs
- Stauroneis gregoryi Ralfs
  - Stauroneis gregori var. hankensis Skvortzov
  - Stauroneis gregorii f. linearis Hustedt
  - Stauroneis gregorii var. densestriata Hustedt
  - Stauroneis gregorii var. obtusiuscula Grunow
- Stauroneis gremmenii Van de Vijver & Lange-Bertalot
- Stauroneis groenlandica Østrup
- Stauroneis grunowii G.Rabenhorst
- Stauroneis guslyakovii Genkal & Yarushina
- Stauroneis halmei K.Mölder
- Stauroneis hannae R.M.Patrick & L.R.Freese
- Stauroneis harrisonii Cholnoky
  - Stauroneis harrisonii var. triangularis Cleve
- Stauroneis hartzii Østrup
- Stauroneis hasta Metzeltin & Lange-Bertalot
- Stauroneis heidenii Forti
- Stauroneis heimii P.Guermeur & Manguin
- Stauroneis heinii Lange-Bertalot & Krammer
- Stauroneis hercynica Krasske
  - Stauroneis hercynica var. major R.M.Patrick & Freese
- Stauroneis heribaudii A.Lauby
- Stauroneis heufleri (Grunow) Grunow
- Stauroneis hickeni Frenguelli
- Stauroneis hochstetteri Ehrenberg
- Stauroneis hologramma Ehrenberg
- Stauroneis hustedtii Simonsen ex Hustedt
- Stauroneis husvikensis Van de Vijver & Lange-Bertalot
- Stauroneis huttonii J.Inglis
- Stauroneis hyalina Juhlin-Dannfelt
- Stauroneis hyi Héribaud-Joseph
- Stauroneis hyperborea Lange-Bertalot & Krammer
- Stauroneis ignorata Hustedt
  - Stauroneis ignorata var. rupestris (Skvortzov) C.W.Reimer
- Stauroneis impenda J.R.Carter & P.Denny
- Stauroneis inaequalis Ehrenberg
- Stauroneis inanis J.A.M.Perty
- Stauroneis incisa Voigt
- Stauroneis incurvata Rochoux d'Aubert
- Stauroneis indianopsis Bahls
- Stauroneis indica Ehrenberg
- Stauroneis indistincta Cholnoky
- Stauroneis inflata Heiden
- Stauroneis intricans van de Vijver & Lange-Bertalot
- Stauroneis irinae Kulikovskiy, Lange-Bertalot & Metzeltin
- Stauroneis italica Lange-Bertalot, Cavacini, Tagliaventi & Alfinito
- Stauroneis jamesrossensis Zidarova, Kopalová & Van de Vijver
- Stauroneis janischii Rabenhorst
- Stauroneis jarensis Lange-Bertalot, Cavacini, Tagliaventi & Alfinito
- Stauroneis javanica (Grunow) Cleve
  - Stauroneis javanica var. arvernense Héribaud-Joseph
  - Stauroneis javanica var. kerguelensis H.Heiden
  - Stauroneis javanica var. oblonga Østrup
  - Stauroneis javanica var. truncata Østrup
- Stauroneis johanseni A.H.Mackay
- Stauroneis joignerezii Fusey
- Stauroneis karelica K.Mölder
- Stauroneis karstenii Hustedt
- Stauroneis karstica Tusset, Tremarin & T.Ludwig
- Stauroneis kingstonii Burge, Marsico & Edlund
- Stauroneis kirtikarii P.T.Sarode & N.D.Kamat
- Stauroneis kishinena Bahls
- Stauroneis kochiae Metzeltin & Lange-Bertalot
- Stauroneis koeltzii Metzeltin, A.Witkowski & Lange-Bertalot
- Stauroneis koniamboensis (Manguin ex Kociolek & Reviers) Gerd Moser
- Stauroneis kootenai Bahls
- Stauroneis krasskei Cholnoky
- Stauroneis kriegeri R.M.Patrick
  - Stauroneis kriegeri f. lanceolata H.Kobayasi & K.Ando
  - Stauroneis kriegeri f. undulata Hustedt
- Stauroneis kryophila Grunow
- Stauroneis kuelbsii Lange-Bertalot
- Stauroneis lacunae Cholnoky
- Stauroneis lacusvulcani P.Rioual
- Stauroneis lanceolata Kützing
- Stauroneis lapidicola J.B.Petersen
- Stauroneis lardonii Van de Vijver
- Stauroneis laterostrata Hustedt
- Stauroneis laticeps Hustedt
  - Stauroneis laticeps var. constricta F.Meister
- Stauroneis latistauros Van de Vijver & Lange-Bertalot
- Stauroneis lecohui Van de Vijver & Lange-Bertalot
- Stauroneis legeri Hustedt
- Stauroneis legumen (Ehrenberg) Kützing
  - Stauroneis legumen f. parva Grunow
  - Stauroneis legumen var. balatonis Pantocsek
  - Stauroneis legumen var. elliptica H.Kobayasi & K.Ando
  - Stauroneis legumen var. integra Manguin
  - Stauroneis legumen var. nipponica (Skvortzov) H.Kobayasi & K.Ando
  - Stauroneis legumen var. parva H.Peragallo
- Stauroneis leguminiformis Lange-Bertalot & Krammer
- Stauroneis leguminopsis Lange-Bertalot & Krammer
- Stauroneis leonardii Compère
- Stauroneis lepchae N.Wadmare, S.Roy, Kociolek & B.Karthick
- Stauroneis lesothensis F.R.Schoeman
- Stauroneis lewisii Bahls
- Stauroneis lignitica Hustedt
- Stauroneis limnetica Kociolek
- Stauroneis lindigiana (Grunow) Cleve
- Stauroneis lineolata Ehrenberg
- Stauroneis liostauron Ehrenberg
- Stauroneis livingstonii C.W.Reimer
- Stauroneis lorami Frenguelli
- Stauroneis lucida J.-J.Brun
- Stauroneis lundii Hustedt
- Stauroneis lychnidis A.Jurilj
- Stauroneis mackintoshii O'Meara
- Stauroneis macrocephala Kützing
- Stauroneis madagascariensis Metzeltin & Lange-Bertalot
- Stauroneis maeotica Pantocsek
  - Stauroneis maeotica var. minor Pantocsek
- Stauroneis manguini Guermeur
- Stauroneis margaritorae Lange-Bertalot, Cavacini, Tagliaventi & Alfinito
- Stauroneis marina Hustedt
- Stauroneis maunakeaensis J.Massey
- Stauroneis medioasiatica Metzeltin, Lange-Bertalot & Nergui
- Stauroneis mediterranea Lange-Bertalot & Van de Vijver
- Stauroneis megaphyllodes Metzeltin & Lange-Bertalot
- Stauroneis melchiori Frenguelli & Orlando
- Stauroneis meniscus J.Schumann
- Stauroneis mesogongyla (Ehrenberg) Ralfs
- Stauroneis mesopachya (Ehrenberg) Ehrenberg
  - Stauroneis mesopachya f. minor A.Lauby
- Stauroneis microbtusa Reichardt
- Stauroneis microproducta Van de Vijver & Lange-Bertalot
- Stauroneis minima Voigt
- Stauroneis minor (Østrup) Cleve-Euler
- Stauroneis minuta Kützing
- Stauroneis minutissima Lagerstedt
- Stauroneis minutula Kützing
- Stauroneis minutula Hustedt
  - Stauroneis minutula var. linearis Hustedt
- Stauroneis miyakoensis A.Tuji
- Stauroneis modestissima Metzeltin, Lange-Bertalot & García-Rodríguez
- Stauroneis mongoliarum Metzeltin & Lange-Bertalot
- Stauroneis monogramma Ehrenberg
- Stauroneis monotica Cholnoky
- Stauroneis muriella J.W.G.Lund
  - Stauroneis muriella f. capitata J.W.G.Lund
  - Stauroneis muriella f. linearis J.W.G.Lund
  - Stauroneis muriella f. triundulata J.W.G.Lund
- Stauroneis nathorstii Foged
- Stauroneis navrongensis Foged
- Stauroneis nebulosa (Krasske) Lange-Bertalot
- Stauroneis neo-ebudica Manguin
- Stauroneis neobudica Manguin
- Stauroneis neocaledonica Manguin
- Stauroneis neofossilis Lange-Bertalot & Metzeltin
- Stauroneis neohyalina Lange-Bertalot & Krammer
- Stauroneis neosiberica Metzeltin & Lange-Bertalot
- Stauroneis neotropica Metzeltin & Lange-Bertalot
- Stauroneis nikolayi Zidarova
- Stauroneis nobilis Schumann
  - Stauroneis nobilis f. alabamae (Heiden) A.Cleve
  - Stauroneis nobilis f. densestriata H.Kobayasi & K.Ando
  - Stauroneis nobilis f. rostrata (H.Heiden) H.Kobayasi
  - Stauroneis nobilis var. baconiana (Stodder) C.W.Reimer
  - Stauroneis nobilis var. capitata H.Kobayasi
  - Stauroneis nobilis var. gracilis H.Kobayasi
  - Stauroneis nobilis var. minima Foged
- Stauroneis nodulosa H.Heiden
- Stauroneis nonotica Cholnoky
- Stauroneis nugsuagensis Foged
- Stauroneis nugsuaquensis Foged
- Stauroneis obesa Greville
- Stauroneis oblonga Grunow
- Stauroneis oblongella H.Heiden
- Stauroneis obscura T.Marsson
- Stauroneis obtusa Lagerstedt
  - Stauroneis obtusa f. indica E.A.Gonzalves & H.P.Gandhi
  - Stauroneis obtusa var. catarinensis Krasske
  - Stauroneis obtusa var. chemburiana E.A.Gonzalves & H.P.Gandhi
  - Stauroneis obtusa var. lapponica f. minor Krasske
  - Stauroneis obtusa var. medioundata Manguin
  - Stauroneis obtusa var. minor V.Zanon
  - Stauroneis obtusa var. nagpurensis P.T.Sarode & N.D.Kamat
- Stauroneis obtuserostrata (Hustedt) M.Poulin
- Stauroneis okamurae Skvortzov
  - Stauroneis okamurae var. lanceolata Skvortzov
- Stauroneis olympica Hustedt
- Stauroneis ovalis W.Gregory
- Stauroneis ovata (Grunow) Cleve
- Stauroneis pacifica F.S.Castracane degli Antelminelli
  - Stauroneis pacifica var. minor H.F.Van Heurck
- Stauroneis pallida T.Marsson
- Stauroneis paludosa Kulikovskiy, Lange-Bertalot, Witkowski & Dorofeyuk
- Stauroneis paludosa Kulikovskiy, Lange-Bertalot, A.Witkowski & N.I.Dorofeyuk
- Stauroneis panduriformis Østrup
- Stauroneis parajavanica Lange-Bertalot, Cavacini, Tagliaventi & Alfinito
  - Stauroneis parajavanica var. mongolica Metzeltin, Lange-Bertalot & S.Nergui
- Stauroneis parallela H.Heiden
- Stauroneis parallelistriata H.Kobayasi
- Stauroneis parasubgracilis Metzeltin & Lange-Bertalot
- Stauroneis parathermicola Lange-Bertalot
- Stauroneis partabgarhensis H.P.Gandhi
- Stauroneis parva (Ehrenberg) Kützing
  - Stauroneis parva var. gracilior Kützing
- Stauroneis parviporis Metzeltin & Lange-Bertalot
- Stauroneis parvula (Grunow) Cleve
  - Stauroneis parvula f. major J.B.Petersen
  - Stauroneis parvula f. subcapitata Østrup
  - Stauroneis parvula var. attenuata D.McCall
  - Stauroneis parvula var. capitata Østrup
  - Stauroneis parvula var. lanceolata Skvortzov
  - Stauroneis parvula var. ruptestris Skvortzov
  - Stauroneis parvula var. undulata T.F.Vozzhennikova
- Stauroneis parvulissima Krammer & Lange-Bertalot
- Stauroneis paucicostata (Rabenhorst) Ralfs
- Stauroneis pax Bahls
- Stauroneis peckii (G.Rabenhorst) Ralfs
- Stauroneis pellucida Cleve/Stodder
  - Stauroneis pellucida f. arctica Cleve
  - Stauroneis pellucida f. mediterranea Cleve
  - Stauroneis pellucida var. contracta Østrup
  - Stauroneis pellucida var. cuneata Østrup
  - Stauroneis pellucida var. orientalis Skvortzov
  - Stauroneis pellucida var. pleurosigmoidea Østrup
- Stauroneis peregrins (Ehrenberg) Ralfs
- Stauroneis perexilis Østrup
- Stauroneis pergracilis Van de Vijver & Lange-Bertalot
- Stauroneis perlucens Østrup
- Stauroneis perminuta Grunow
- Stauroneis perpusilla Grunow
  - Stauroneis perpusilla var. obtusiuscula Grunow
- Stauroneis phoenicenteron (Nitzsch) Ehrenberg - type species
  - Stauroneis pheonicenteron var. baicalensis Skvortzov & K.I.Meyer
  - Stauroneis phoenicenteron f. alaskana Foged
  - Stauroneis phoenicenteron f. angulata Hustedt
  - Stauroneis phoenicenteron f. baicalensis Skvortzov & K.I.Meyer
  - Stauroneis phoenicenteron f. brevis (Dippel) Hustedt
  - Stauroneis phoenicenteron f. brunii (M.Peragallo & Héribaud) M.Voigt
  - Stauroneis phoenicenteron f. capitata E.A.Gonzalves & H.P.Gandhi
  - Stauroneis phoenicenteron f. crassa M.Peragallo & Héribaud-Joseph
  - Stauroneis phoenicenteron f. curta Skvortzov
  - Stauroneis phoenicenteron f. dippelii N.Woodhead & R.D.Tweed
  - Stauroneis phoenicenteron f. genuina Hustedt
  - Stauroneis phoenicenteron f. gracilis Hustedt
  - Stauroneis phoenicenteron f. hankensis Skvortzov
  - Stauroneis phoenicenteron f. intermedia Dippel
  - Stauroneis phoenicenteron f. lanceolata (Kützing) Hustedt
  - Stauroneis phoenicenteron f. minima Foged
  - Stauroneis phoenicenteron f. minor Rabenhorst
  - Stauroneis phoenicenteron f. nipponica Skvortzov
  - Stauroneis phoenicenteron f. oblongella (Skvortzov) H.Kobayasi
  - Stauroneis phoenicenteron f. producta H.P.Gandhi
  - Stauroneis phoenicenteron f. producta West
  - Stauroneis phoenicenteron f. truncata Dippel
  - Stauroneis phoenicenteron var. gracilis A.Mann
  - Stauroneis phoenicenteron var. agapica N.A.Skabichevskaja
  - Stauroneis phoenicenteron var. angustior Pantocsek
  - Stauroneis phoenicenteron var. baileyi (Ehrenberg) Cleve
  - Stauroneis phoenicenteron var. ceylonica Skvortzov
  - Stauroneis phoenicenteron var. correntina Frenguelli
  - Stauroneis phoenicenteron var. elegans G.A.Prowse
  - Stauroneis phoenicenteron var. genuina Cleve
  - Stauroneis phoenicenteron var. genuina f. lanceolata (Kützing) Ant.Mayer
  - Stauroneis phoenicenteron var. gracilis Brun & M.Peragallo
  - Stauroneis phoenicenteron var. gracilis Dippel
  - Stauroneis phoenicenteron var. hankensis Skvortzov
  - Stauroneis phoenicenteron var. hattorii Tsumura
  - Stauroneis phoenicenteron var. intermedia (Dippel) A.Cleve
  - Stauroneis phoenicenteron var. lanceolata (Kützing) Cleve
  - Stauroneis phoenicenteron var. lanceolata (Kützing) J.-J.Brun
  - Stauroneis phoenicenteron var. lanceolata f. major Héribaud-Joseph
  - Stauroneis phoenicenteron var. latestriata A.Cleve
  - Stauroneis phoenicenteron var. linearis (Ehrenberg) Hustedt
  - Stauroneis phoenicenteron var. oblongella Skvortzov
  - Stauroneis phoenicenteron var. prolongata A.Cleve
  - Stauroneis phoenicenteron var. signata F.Meister
  - Stauroneis phoenicenteron var. vulgaris f. hankensis Skvortzov
  - Stauroneis phoenicenteron var. vulgaris f. intermedia Dippel
  - Stauroneis phoenicenteron var. vulgaris Dippel
  - Stauroneis phoenicenteron var. yberiana Frenguelli
- Stauroneis phyllodes Ehrenberg
  - Stauroneis phyllodes var. intermedia A.Amossé
  - Stauroneis phyllodes var. obtusa Østrup
  - Stauroneis phyllodes var. obtusa f. minor A.Cleve
- Stauroneis pikuni Bahls
- Stauroneis placentula Ehrenberg
- Stauroneis platalea (Ehrenberg) Ehrenberg
- Stauroneis platystoma Ehrenberg
- Stauroneis playfairiana Skvortzov
- Stauroneis plicata C.Brockmann
- Stauroneis polymorpha Lagerstedt
- Stauroneis polynesiae (J.-J.Brun) Hustedt
- Stauroneis poretzkii Popova
- Stauroneis producta Grunow
  - Stauroneis producta f. minor Foged
- Stauroneis prominula (Grunow ex Cleve) Hustedt
- Stauroneis pseudagrestis Lange-Bertalot & Werum
- Stauroneis pseudoagrestis Lange-Bertalot & Werum
- Stauroneis pseudomuriella Van de Vijver & Lange-Bertalot
- Stauroneis pseudoschimanskii Van de Vijver & Lange-Bertalot
- Stauroneis pseudoseptata T.A.Bond
- Stauroneis pseudosmithii Van de Vijver & Lange-Bertalot
- Stauroneis pseudosubobtusoides H.Germain
- Stauroneis pseudotenera H.Kobayasi & K.Ando
- Stauroneis pseudothermicola Cholnoky
- Stauroneis pteroidea Ehrenberg
- Stauroneis pumila Kützing
- Stauroneis punensis Lange-Bertalot & U.Rumrich
- Stauroneis pusilla Ehrenberg
- Stauroneis pusilla Grunow
- Stauroneis pygmea Castracane
  - Stauroneis pygmaea f. undulata Hustedt
  - Stauroneis pygmaea var. africana Cholnoky
  - Stauroneis pygmaea var. densestriata Cholnoky
- Stauroneis quadrata Héribaud-Joseph
- Stauroneis quadripedis (Cleve-Euler) Hendey
- Stauroneis quadripedis A.Cleve
- Stauroneis quarnerensis Grunow
- Stauroneis rabenhorstii Ralfs
- Stauroneis radissonii M.Poulin & A.Cardinal
- Stauroneis recondita Krasske
- Stauroneis regina Bahls
- Stauroneis reichardtii Lange-Bertalot, Cavacini, Tagliaventi & Alfinito
- Stauroneis reichardtiopsis Zidarova, Kopalová & Van de Vijver
- Stauroneis reicheltii Heiden
- Stauroneis resoluta Gerd Moser
- Stauroneis respectabilis Lange-Bertalot, Cavacini, Tagliaventi & Alfinito
- Stauroneis retrostauron (A.Mann) F.Meister
- Stauroneis rex Bahls
- Stauroneis rhombica O'Meara
- Stauroneis rhombus Østrup
- Stauroneis robusta Petit
- Stauroneis roraimae (Ehrenberg) Ralfs
- Stauroneis rostrata (Hustedt) Metzeltin & Lange-Bertalot
- Stauroneis rostrifera E.Reichardt
- Stauroneis rotundata Greville
- Stauroneis ruacanae Cholnoky
- Stauroneis rupestris Skvortzow [Skvortzov]
- Stauroneis rusticula Van de Vijver & Lange-Bertalot
- Stauroneis sacajaweae Bahls
- Stauroneis sagitta Cleve
- Stauroneis salebrosa V.A.Nikolajev
- Stauroneis salsa R.M.Patrick & Freese
  - Stauroneis salsa var. elliptica R.M.Patrick & L.R.Freese
- Stauroneis saprophila M.Rybak, T.Noga & L.Ector
- Stauroneis scandinavica Lagerstedt
- Stauroneis scaphulaeformis Greville
- Stauroneis schimanskii Krammer
- Stauroneis schinzii (Brun) Cleve
  - Stauroneis schinzii var. argentina Frenguelli
  - Stauroneis schinzii var. maxima Frenguelli
  - Stauroneis schinzii var. nyassensis O.Müller
- Stauroneis schmidiae R.Jahn & N.Abarca
- Stauroneis schroederi Hustedt
  - Stauroneis schroederi f. capitata I.Szalai
- Stauroneis schulzii Jousé
- Stauroneis semen Ehrenberg
- Stauroneis semiaperta (Manguin) Metzeltin & Lange-Bertalot
- Stauroneis senegalensis Guermeur
- Stauroneis separanda Lange-Bertalot & Werum
- Stauroneis siberica (Grunow) Lange-Bertalot & Krammer
  - Stauroneis siberica var. papilionacea Van de Vijver & Lange-Bertalot
- Stauroneis sieboldii Ehrenberg
- Stauroneis sigma Ehrenberg
- Stauroneis signata (F.Meister) Skvortzov
  - Stauroneis signata f. gracilis Skvortzov
- Stauroneis signata Frenguelli
- Stauroneis sikkimensis N.Wadmare, S.Roy, Kociolek & B.Karthick
- Stauroneis silvahassiaca Lange-Bertalot & Werum
- Stauroneis similaris R.Hagelstein
- Stauroneis simulans (Donkin) R.Ross
- Stauroneis singula J.R.Carter & P.Denny
- Stauroneis skabitschewskyi Kulikovskiy, Lange-Bertalot & Metzeltin
- Stauroneis slateri Foged
- Stauroneis smithiana Grunow
- Stauroneis smithii Grunow
  - Stauroneis smithii f. acuminata Cleve-Euler
  - Stauroneis smithii f. fontinalis Foged
  - Stauroneis smithii var. borgei (Manguin) Hustedt
  - Stauroneis smithii var. elliptica Hustedt
  - Stauroneis smithii var. incisa Pantocsek
  - Stauroneis smithii var. karelica Wislouch & Kolbe
  - Stauroneis smithii var. minima Haworth
  - Stauroneis smithii var. minor P.Fusey
  - Stauroneis smithii var. perlucens (Østrup) M.E.K.Møller
  - Stauroneis smithii var. rhombica F.Meister
  - Stauroneis smithii var. smithii Grunow
- Stauroneis sofia Van de Vijver & Lange-Bertalot
- Stauroneis sonyae Kulikovskiy, Lange-Bertalot, Witkowski & Dorofeyuk
- Stauroneis soodensis (Krasske) Cholnoky
- Stauroneis spauldingiae Bahls
- Stauroneis sphaerophora Ehrenberg
- Stauroneis sphaerophoron Ehrenberg
- Stauroneis sphagnicola Krasske
- Stauroneis sphagnophila Krasske
  - Stauroneis sphagnophila f. usterii Krasske
- Stauroneis spicula Cleve & Grunow
- Stauroneis staurolineata C.W.Reimer
  - Stauroneis staurolineata var. japonica H.Kobayasi & K.Ando
- Stauroneis staurophaena Ehrenberg
- Stauroneis stellae Lange-Bertalot, Cavacini, Tagliaventi & Alfinito
- Stauroneis stodderi Greenleaf
  - Stauroneis stodderi var. japonica H.Kobayasi
- Stauroneis strelnikovae Lange-Bertalot & Van de Vijver
- Stauroneis subalpina J.R.Carter
- Stauroneis subaustralis Van de Vijver & Lange-Bertalot
- Stauroneis subborealis Bahls
- Stauroneis subdahomensis Guermeur
  - Stauroneis subdahomensis var. lanceolata Guermeur
- Stauroneis subgracilis Lange-Bertalot & Krammer
- Stauroneis subgraclior Lange-Bertalot, Cavacini, Tagliaventi & Alfinito
- Stauroneis subhyperborea Van de Vijver & Lange-Bertalot
- Stauroneis submarginalis Bahls
- Stauroneis submarina Hustedt
- Stauroneis subobtusa Hustedt
- Stauroneis subtilis Manguin
- Stauroneis subtropica Cholnoky
- Stauroneis subula Ehrenberg
- Stauroneis sulcata Cleve
- Stauroneis superacuta Lange-Bertalot, Metzeltin & Van de Vijver
- Stauroneis supergracilis Van de Vijver & Lange-Bertalot
- Stauroneis superhyperborea Van de Vijver, Beyens & Lange-Bertalot
- Stauroneis superkuelbsii Bahls
- Stauroneis suranii Metzeltin Lange-Bertalot & Nergui
- Stauroneis svalbardensis Van de Vijver & Lange-Bertalot
- Stauroneis sylviabonillae Metzeltin, Lange-Bertalot & García-Rodríguez
- Stauroneis szontaghii Pantocsek
- Stauroneis tackei (Hustedt) Krammer & Lange-Bertalot
- Stauroneis tamnaeana Guermeur
- Stauroneis tatrica R.Gutwinski
- Stauroneis tenera Hustedt
- Stauroneis tenuis H.P.Gandhi
- Stauroneis tenuissima Hustedt
- Stauroneis terryi D.B.Ward ex T.C.Palmer
- Stauroneis thaitiana Castracane
  - Stauroneis thaitiana var. polynesiae J.-J.Brun
- Stauroneis thermicola (J.B.Petersen) J.W.G.Lund
  - Stauroneis thermicola var. elongata J.W.G.Lund
- Stauroneis thermicoloides Van de Vijver & Lange-Bertalot
- Stauroneis thienemanni Hustedt
- Stauroneis thienemannii Hustedt
- Stauroneis thompsonii Bahls
- Stauroneis tibestiana Guermeur
- Stauroneis tibetica K.S.Mereschkowsky
- Stauroneis triundulata Cholnoky
- Stauroneis tropicalis Guermeur
  - Stauroneis tropicalis var. undulata Guermeur
- Stauroneis truncata (Rabenhorst) Ralfs
- Stauroneis truncata H.P.Gandhi
- Stauroneis tumida J.Schumann
- Stauroneis tumidula Grunow
- Stauroneis turfosa Tarnavschi & Jitariu
  - Stauroneis turfosa var. reimeri P.Rivera
- Stauroneis tylophora H.Reichelt
- Stauroneis tyrrhenica Lange-Bertalot, Cavacini, Tagliaventi & Alfinito
- Stauroneis undata Hustedt
- Stauroneis undosa Ehrenberg
- Stauroneis undulata Hilse
- Stauroneis ursamaioris Lange-Bertalot & Van de Vijver
- Stauroneis valderostrata Metzeltin & Lange-Bertalot
- Stauroneis valeriana Metzeltin, Lange-Bertalot & García-Rodríguez
- Stauroneis vandevijveri Bahls
- Stauroneis ventriosus Metzeltin & Lange-Bertalot
  - Stauroneis ventricosa var. explicata (J.A.M.Perty) G.Rabenhorst
- Stauroneis verbania G.De Notaris
- Stauroneis vesca K.E.Lohman & G.W.Andrews
- Stauroneis vibrio Ehrenberg
- Stauroneis virginica Ehrenberg
- Stauroneis visenda Brown
- Stauroneis vixacuta Lange-Bertalot & Metzeltin
- Stauroneis vladivostokensis Skvortzov
- Stauroneis washingtonia A.Mann
- Stauroneis wipplingeri Cholnoky
- Stauroneis wislouchi Poretzky & Anisimova
  - Stauroneis wislouchii f. parva V.S.Poretzky & Anisimova
- Stauroneis zackenbergensis Van de Vijver & Lange-Bertalot
- Stauroneis zairensis Compère
