= Waseges River =

River in Kenya

- Mouth location in Kenya

Physical characteristics
- Source
  - coordinates: 0.015836°S 36.222267°E
- Mouth
  - coordinates: 0.342698°N 36.078147°E

The Waseges River, or Sandai River, is a river in Kenya. Its source is on the slopes of the Nyandarua Plateau below the Aberdare Range; it ends its course in Lake Bogoria.

In 2002 rubies were found in the region of the Waseges River.

== Course ==
The river flows north, then west and south to enter Lake Bogoria in the Great Rift Valley from the north after passing through the Kesubo swamp.

In its upper reaches, the Waseges flows through regions of intensive coffee cultivation where heavy use is made of chemical fertilizers and pesticides. Lower down it flows through bush and scrub used for grazing, and then through very dry bush before entering the lake at its northern end. The river is seasonal, and is the main affluent of the lake. The inertial flow of the river may generate counter-clockwise currents in the lake.

== Chemistry ==
Its water pH is 8, a mild alkaline level.

== Irrigation scheme ==
The Waseges is an important source of irrigation water. With rising populations, by 1985 the Tugen people of Sandai were sometimes refusing to allow their neighbors, the Camus people, to use water from the river. The Sandai farmers had been in the habit of cultivating two or three out of six cultivated areas each year. A given area would be farmed for three or four years, then left fallow for up to four years. All the areas are fed by canals from the Waseges, but half the canals will be blocked at any time. Use of the irrigated farm areas involved agreements between the Tugen and Camus people.

An irrigation scheme carried out by the Baringo District Provincial Irrigation Unit (PIU), funded and given technical support by Dutch Aid, aimed to improve the usage of the river waters. The planned irrigation scheme was based on a single large concrete-lined canal feeding just one area. Scheduled for launch in 1983, there were delays due to protests from the local people, and the project was not completed until the 1987/1988 season. The project introduced a less flexible system, created tensions between the Tugen and Camus people, and tensions among the Tugen.

Before 2003 the river was illegally diverted for irrigation upstream in the Subukia area, causing it to dry up downstream during a period of drought. In 2003 the Ministry of Water Management and Development proposed to establish river basin catchment committees and water user associations to manage the use of the river.

== Sources ==
- Hughes, R. H.; Hughes, J. S. (1992). A directory of African wetlands. IUCN. ISBN 2-88032-949-3.
- Karua (June 17, 2003). "Diversion of River Waseges". Parliamentary Debates.
- "Lake Bogoria National Reserve". UNESCO.
- Little, Peter D. (1992). The elusive granary: herder, farmer, and state in northern Kenya. Cambridge University Press. ISBN 0-521-40552-1.
- Renaut, Robin W.; Owen, R. Bernhart (1991). "Lake Bogoria". In Anadón, P.; Cabrera, Ll; Kelts, K. R. (eds.). Lacustrine facies analysis. John Wiley & Sons. pp. 175–194. ISBN 0-632-03149-2.
- Owen, R. Bernhart; Renaut, Robin W.; Hover, V.C.; Ashley, G.M.; Muasya, M. (January 2004). "Swamps, springs and diatoms: Wetlands of the semi-arid Bogoria-Baringo Rift, Kenya". Hydrobiologia. 518 (1): 59–78. doi:10.1023/B:HYDR.0000025057.62967.2c.
- "An overview of ruby". RMC Gems.
