= Nakuru =

- City
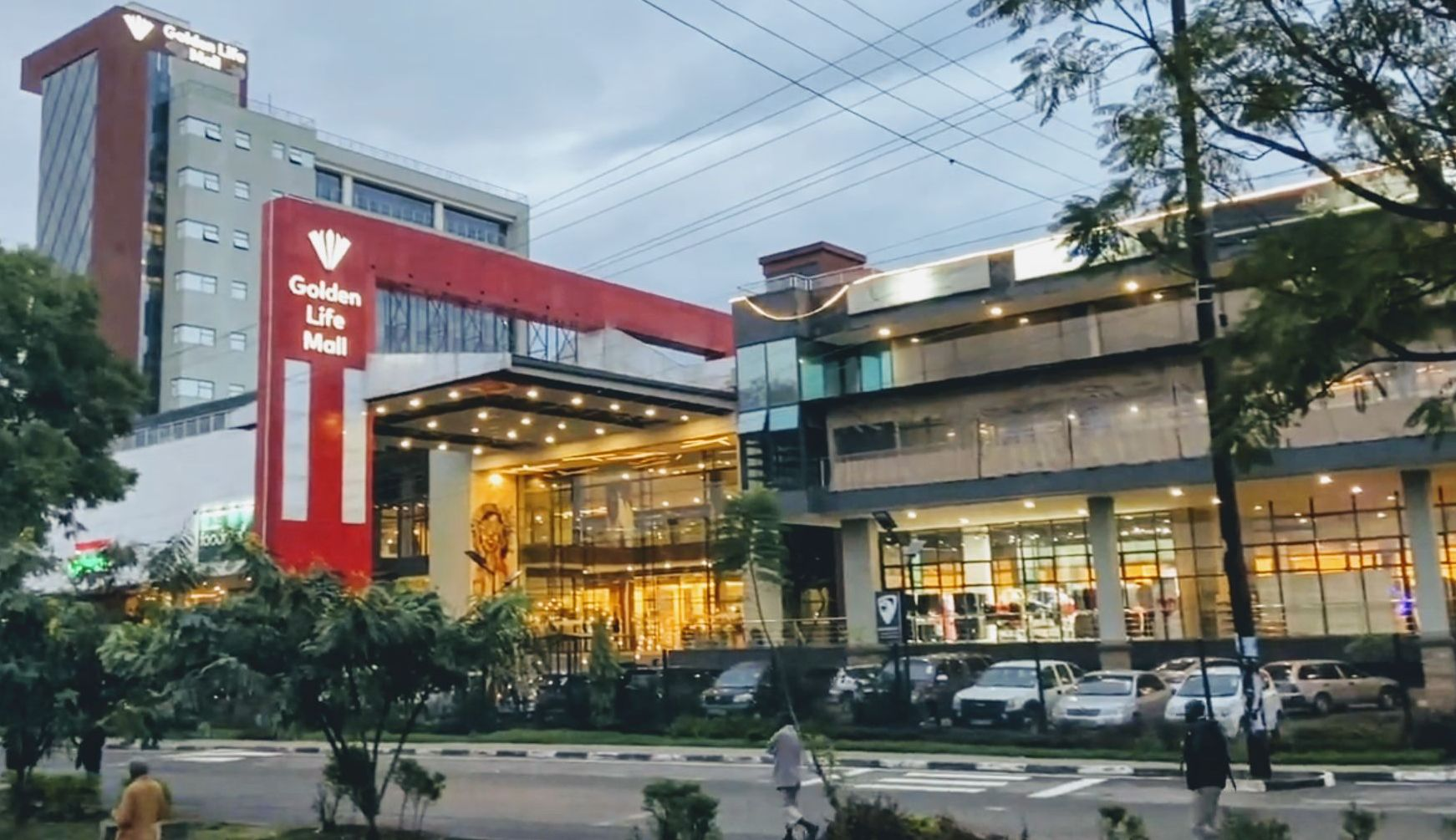
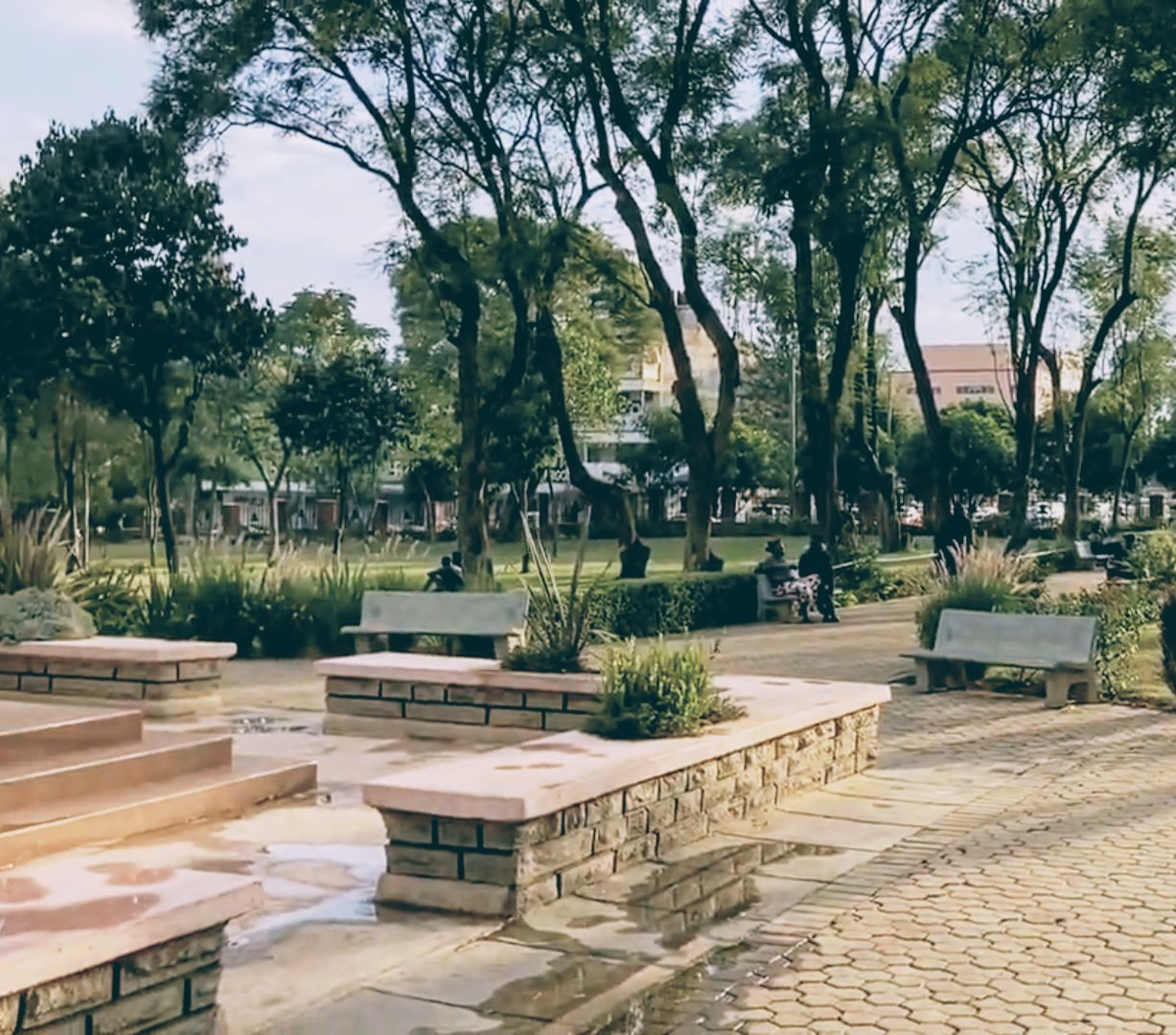
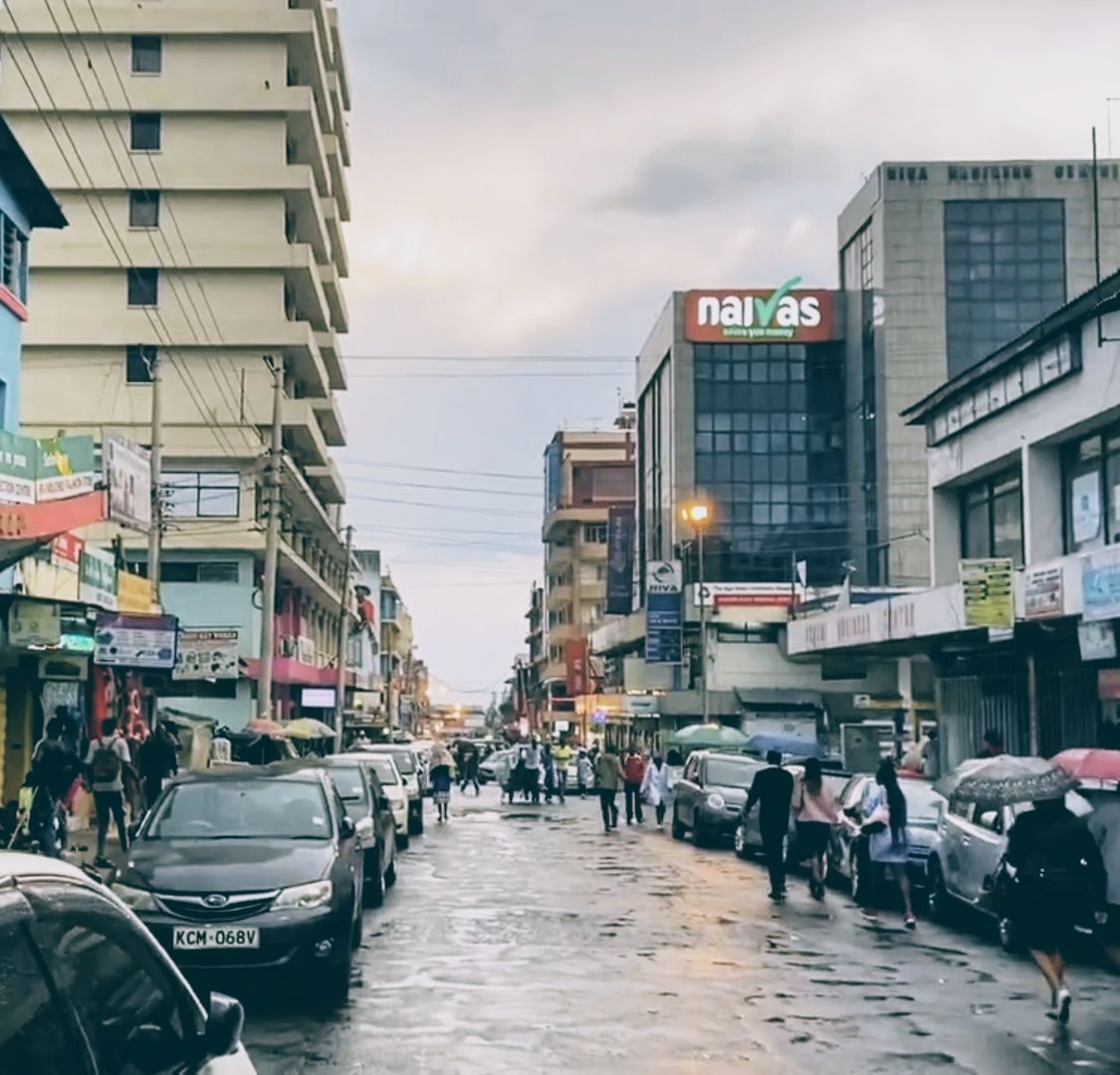
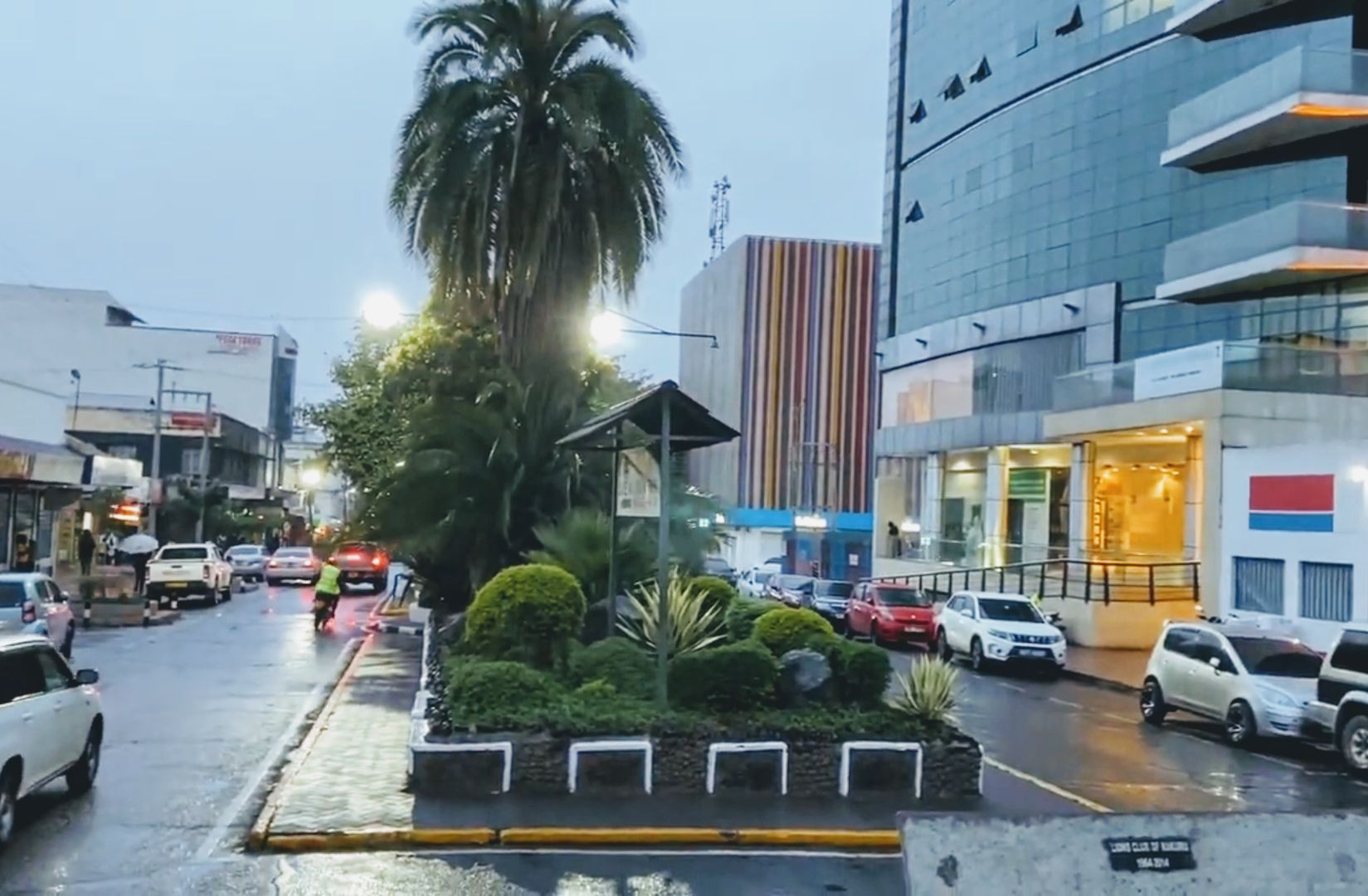
- Clockwise from top: Golden Life Mall, Pundit Nehru Road, Moi Road, Uhuru Gardens

- Location within Kenya
- Coordinates: 0°18′S 36°4′E
- Country: Kenya
- County: Nakuru County
- Founded: 1904

Government
  - Type: County Government
  - Body: County Assembly
  - Governor: Susan Kihika
- Elevation: 1,850 m (6,070 ft)

Population
  - Urban: 570,674

GDP (PPP) Metro
  - Total: ▲$13.979 billion (3rd)(2022)
  - Per Capita: ▲$6,080 (2022) (7th)

GDP (NOMINAL) Metro
  - Total: ▲$5.133 billion (2022) (3rd)
  - Per Capita: ▲$2,233 (2022) (7th)
- Time zone: UTC+3 (EAT)

Nakuru, sometimes referred to as Nakuru City, is the capital and largest city of Nakuru County, Kenya. As of 2019, Nakuru had an urban population of 570,674. The city lies along the Nairobi–Nakuru Highway, 160 kilometres (99 mi) from Nairobi, the capital city of Kenya. In December 2021, Nakuru City became the fourth urban area in Kenya to be assigned the status of "city".

By virtue of being within Nakuru County, the city is variously considered to be part of either the Mount Kenya region or the Great Rift Valley region, although neither region is an official administrative nor governmental subdivision of Kenya. Nakuru City is the largest urban area (by population) of both the Mount Kenya region and the Great Rift Valley region.

== History ==
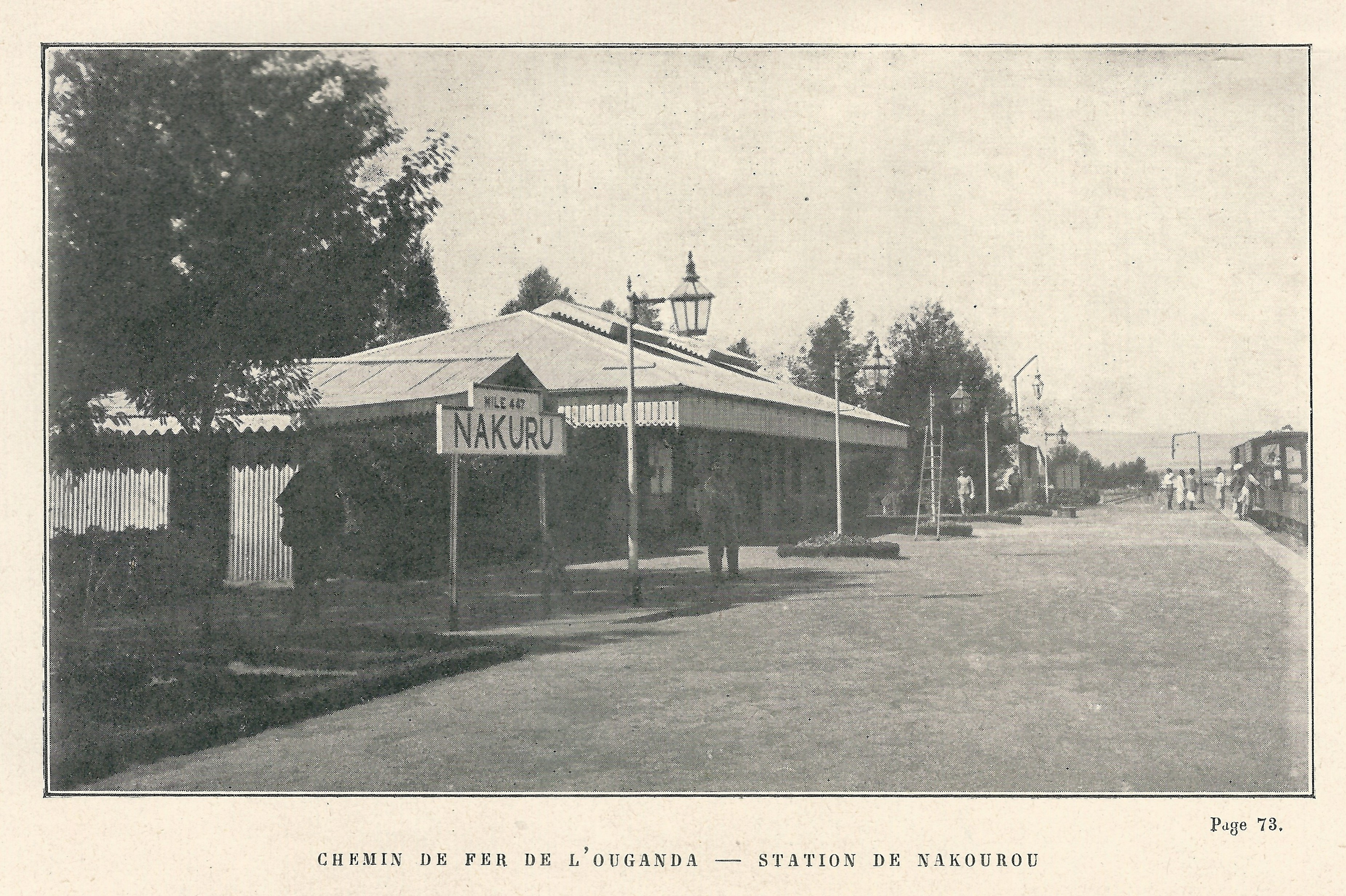
Nakuru in 1913

Archaeological discoveries were located about 8 kilometres (26,000 ft) from the Central Business District at Hyrax Hill.

The city was incepted on 28 January 1904 when a local area one mile away from the railway station's main entrance was proclaimed to be a township by the British authorities. The name of the town was derived from the Maasai-speaking people of Kenya.

During the colonial era, the British established Nakuru as part of the White Highlands and it became a municipality in 1952.

After the founding of the Republic of Kenya, the first and second presidents of Kenya, Jomo Kenyatta and Daniel Arap Moi respectively, had their semi-official residences. The city had been known for Kenyan politics and was home to politicians such as Kariuki Chotara, Kihika Kimani, Mirugi Kariuki, and Koigi Wamwere.

During the 2007 post-election violence, dozens of buildings in Nakuru were burnt to the ground.

On 3 June 2021, Nakuru was no longer a municipality after the Kenyan Senate voted that its status was adequate enough to be a city. Following the Senate of Kenya's approval in June, the President of the Republic of Kenya chartered Nakuru on 1 December 2021. It is the fourth urban centre in Kenya to be declared a city after Nairobi, Mombasa, and Kisumu.

== Geography ==
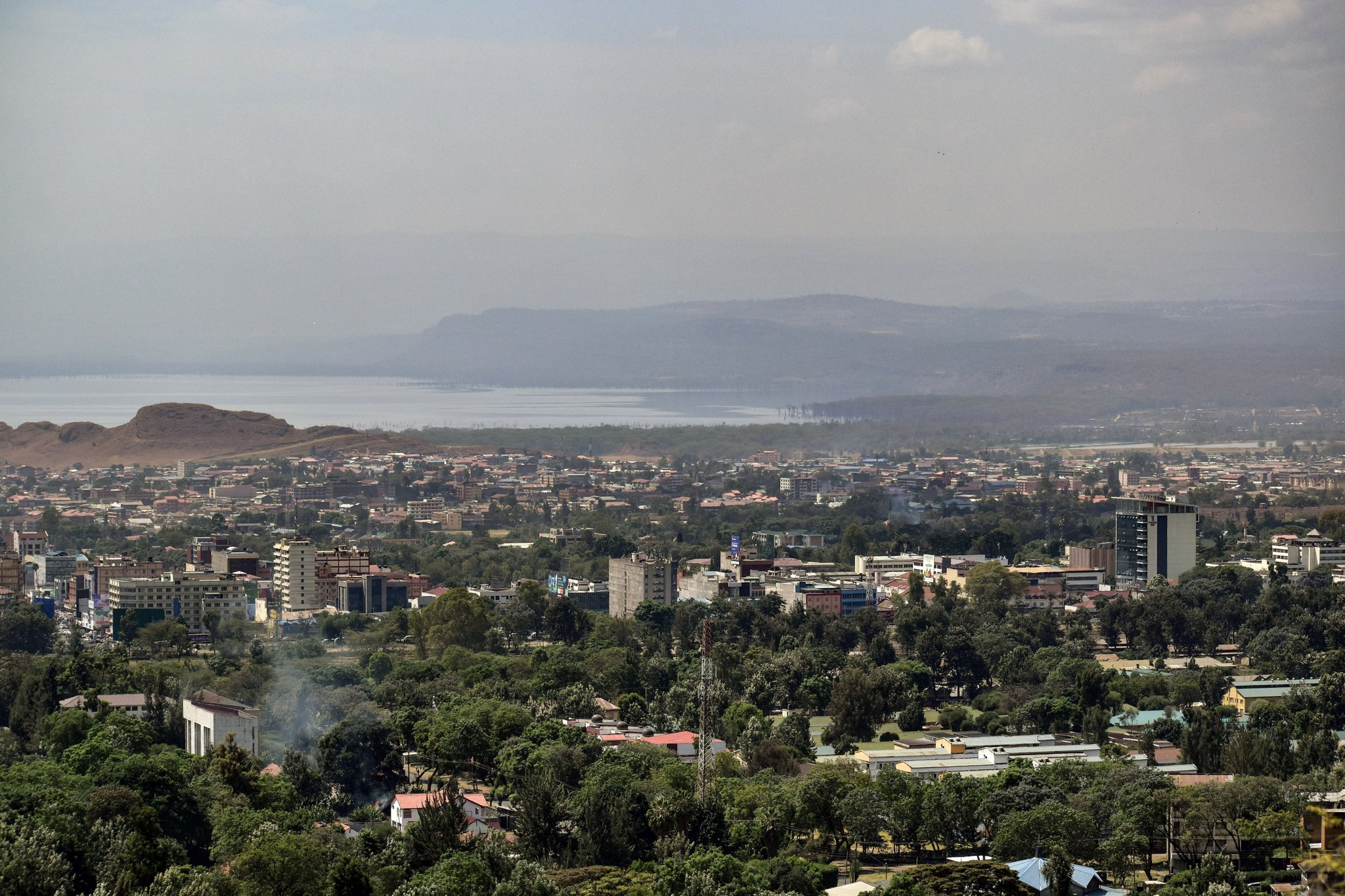
View of Nakuru City and Lake Nakuru from Milimani area

The city of Nakuru is situated in Nakuru County, Kenya. It lies 1,850 metres above sea level.

Nakuru County holds four of the Rift Valley lakes, Lake Solai, Lake Nakuru, Lake Elementaita, and Lake Naivasha.

=== Climate ===
Nakuru has temperate and subtropical highland climates (known as Csb); temperatures fall significantly at night and between June and August.

Climate data for Nakuru, elevation 1,901 m (6,237 ft), (1981–2008 normals)
Month	Jan	Feb	Mar	Apr	May	Jun	Jul	Aug	Sep	Oct	Nov	Dec	Year
Mean daily maximum °C (°F)	26.2 (79.2)	27.4 (81.3)	26.9 (80.4)	24.6 (76.3)	24.0 (75.2)	23.6 (74.5)	22.9 (73.2)	23.5 (74.3)	24.7 (76.5)	24.2 (75.6)	23.3 (73.9)	24.6 (76.3)	24.7 (76.4)
Daily mean °C (°F)	19.4 (66.9)	20.0 (68.0)	20.2 (68.4)	19.3 (66.7)	18.8 (65.8)	18.3 (64.9)	17.8 (64.0)	18.0 (64.4)	18.3 (64.9)	18.2 (64.8)	18.0 (64.4)	18.5 (65.3)	18.7 (65.7)
Mean daily minimum °C (°F)	12.5 (54.5)	12.6 (54.7)	13.4 (56.1)	14.0 (57.2)	13.7 (56.7)	13.0 (55.4)	12.6 (54.7)	12.4 (54.3)	11.9 (53.4)	12.2 (54.0)	12.7 (54.9)	12.4 (54.3)	12.8 (55.0)
Average precipitation mm (inches)	29 (1.1)	45 (1.8)	69 (2.7)	141 (5.6)	130 (5.1)	79 (3.1)	92 (3.6)	105 (4.1)	89 (3.5)	70 (2.8)	70 (2.8)	44 (1.7)	963 (37.9)
Average precipitation days	6	6	9	17	15	11	12	14	11	12	13	6	132
Average relative humidity (%)	56.7	51.7	57.7	72.0	73.6	71.8	71.8	71.6	67.3	70.0	72.8	63.9	66.7
Source 1: World Meteorological Organization
Source 2: IEM

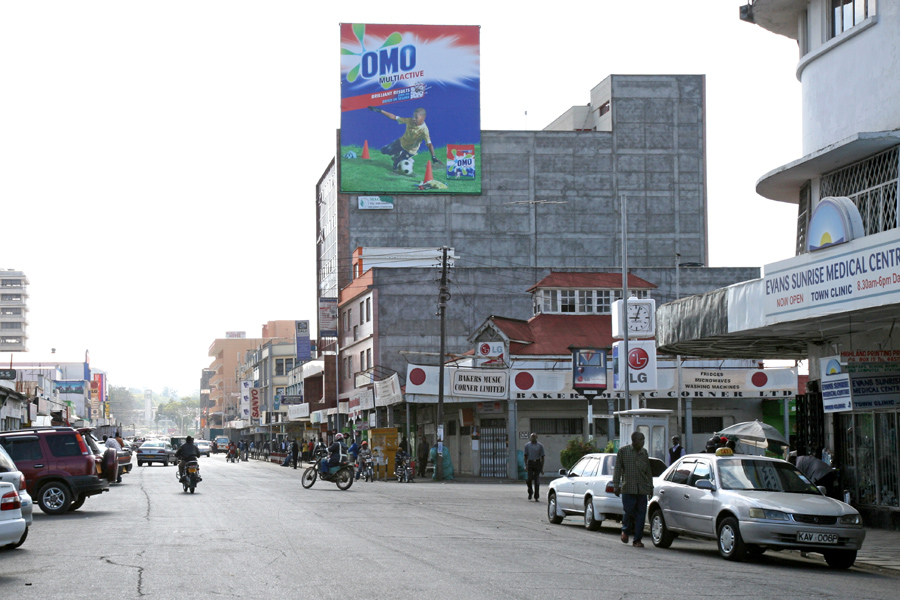
Kenyatta Avenue, Nakuru

Nyayo Gardens

=== Gardens ===
The Nyayo Gardens are located along Kenyatta Avenue in Nakuru.

== Economy ==
Agriculture, manufacturing and tourism make up the economy of Nakuru. Around the city, it is widely known for its agricultural activity. The main crops grown include coffee, wheat, barley, maize, beans, and potatoes. These crops are stored in great silos at the outskirts of the city, stored by the National Cereals and Produce Board and Lesiolo Grain Handlers Limited. The crops are the main sources for manufacturing industries found in Nakuru and Nairobi, such as flour milling and grain ginneries. Dairy farming supplies milk processing plants within Nakuru.

Some manufacturing industries include the production of soaps, motorcycles, batteries, and gardening equipment.

Nakuru is one of Kenya's largest hubs for retail supermarket chains with The Nakumatt, Naivas, Tuskys, and Gilanis being founded.

The city is also a centre for various retail businesses that provide goods and services to the manufacturing and agricultural sectors. A large public market lies to the west of the town on the main thoroughfare to the capital, Nairobi.

== Human resources ==
=== Education ===
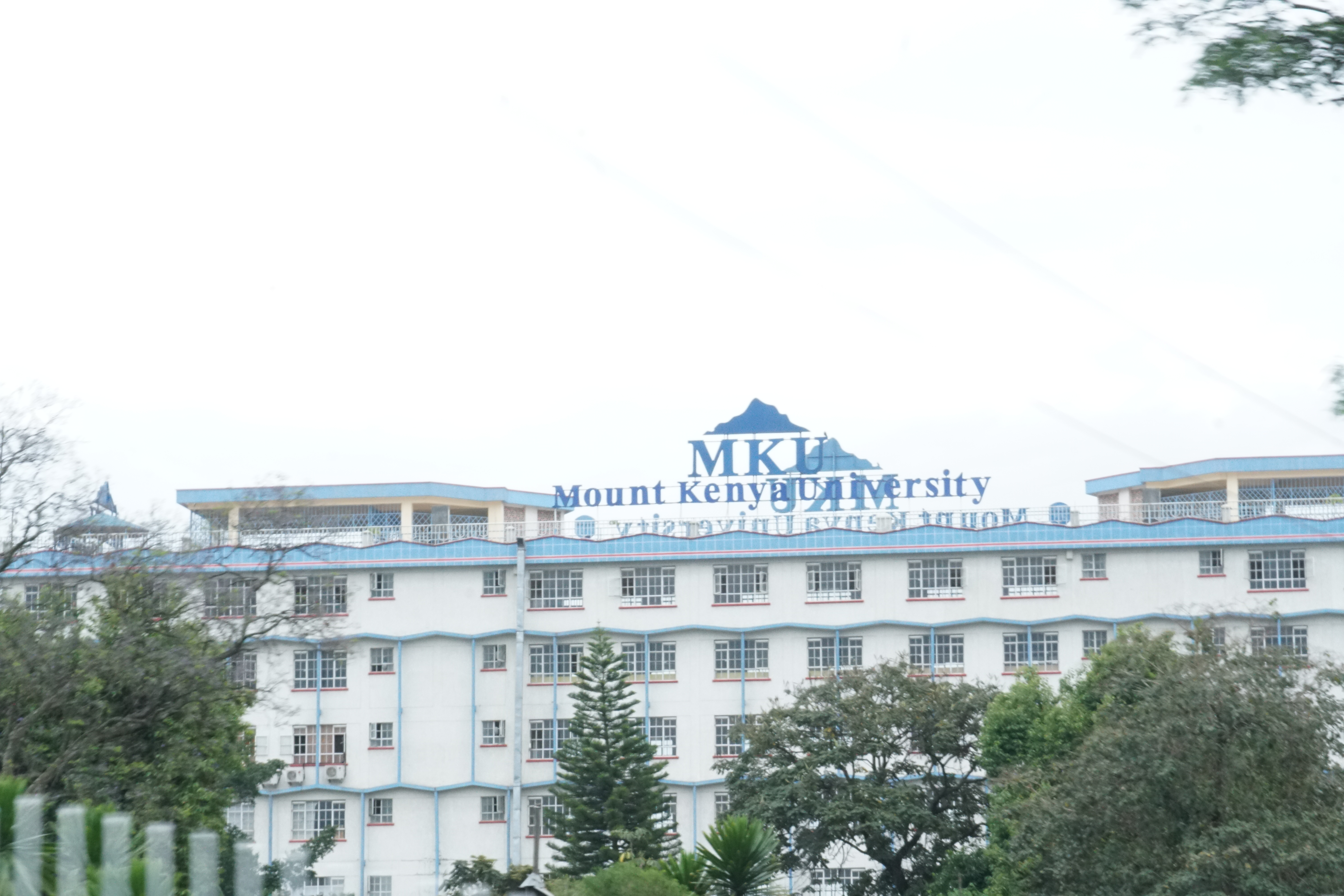
Mount Kenya University (MKU) Nakuru Town branch

Nakuru is the home of Egerton University and Kabarak University, a private university associated with former President Moi's business and religious interests. Mount Kenya University, University of Nairobi and Kenyatta University have campuses situated here.

Nakuru contains numerous public and private secondary schools. Public schools include Nakuru Boys High School and Nakuru Girls High School (formerly Nakuru High School), Menengai High School, and Nakuru Day Secondary School.

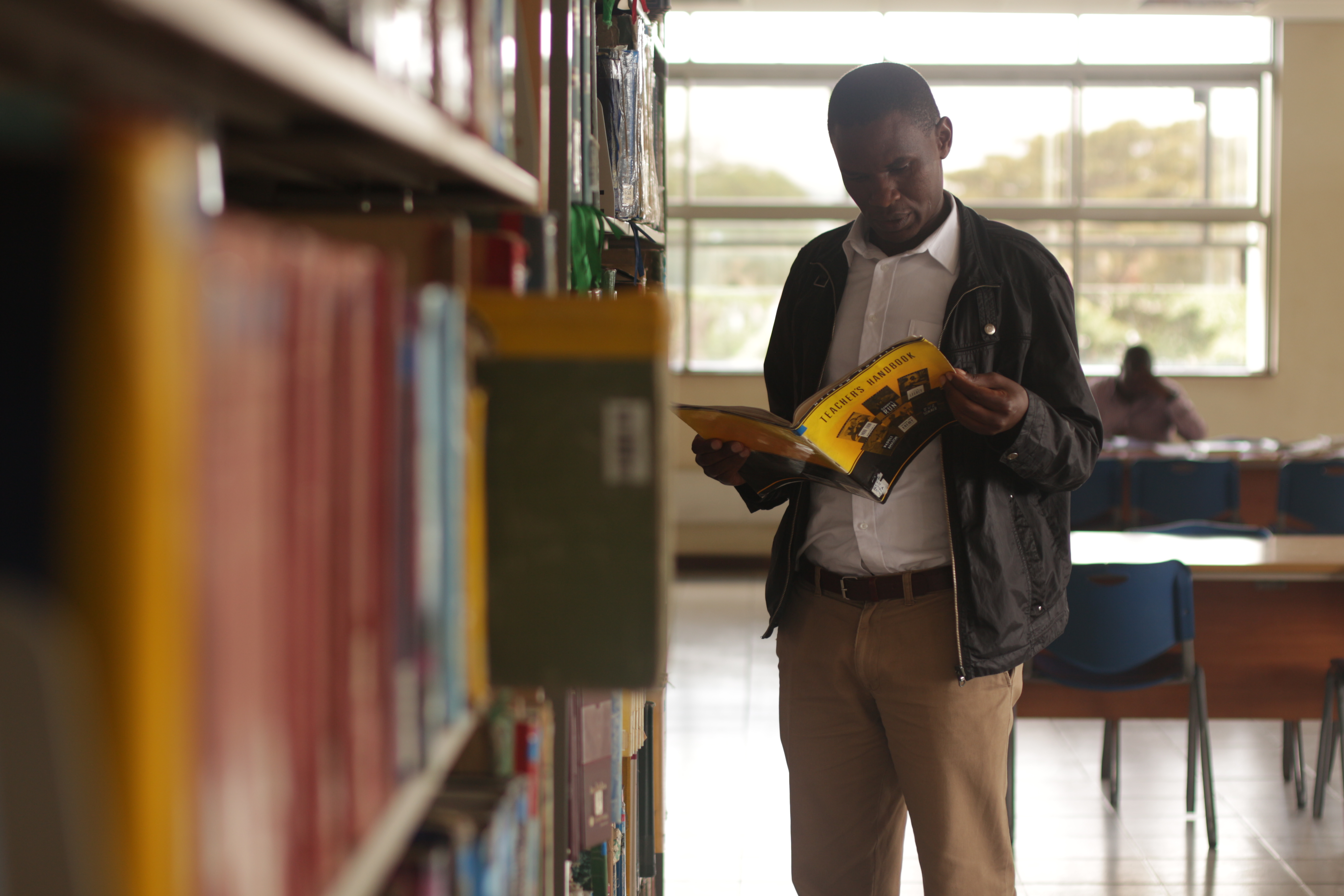
A user at the Nakuru knls Library

There is a public library run by the Kenya National Library Service.

=== Public health ===
The Nakuru hospital is one of the largest in the county, historically the biggest in the province of Rift Valley. It is also home to the Nakuru War Memorial Hospital, opened shortly after World War I by Norman Jewell to commemorate troops.

=== Public safety ===
==== Police and law enforcement ====
Nakuru has a fire department that can be accessed by calling 911. The number can be called in case of any other emergencies.

== Transportation ==
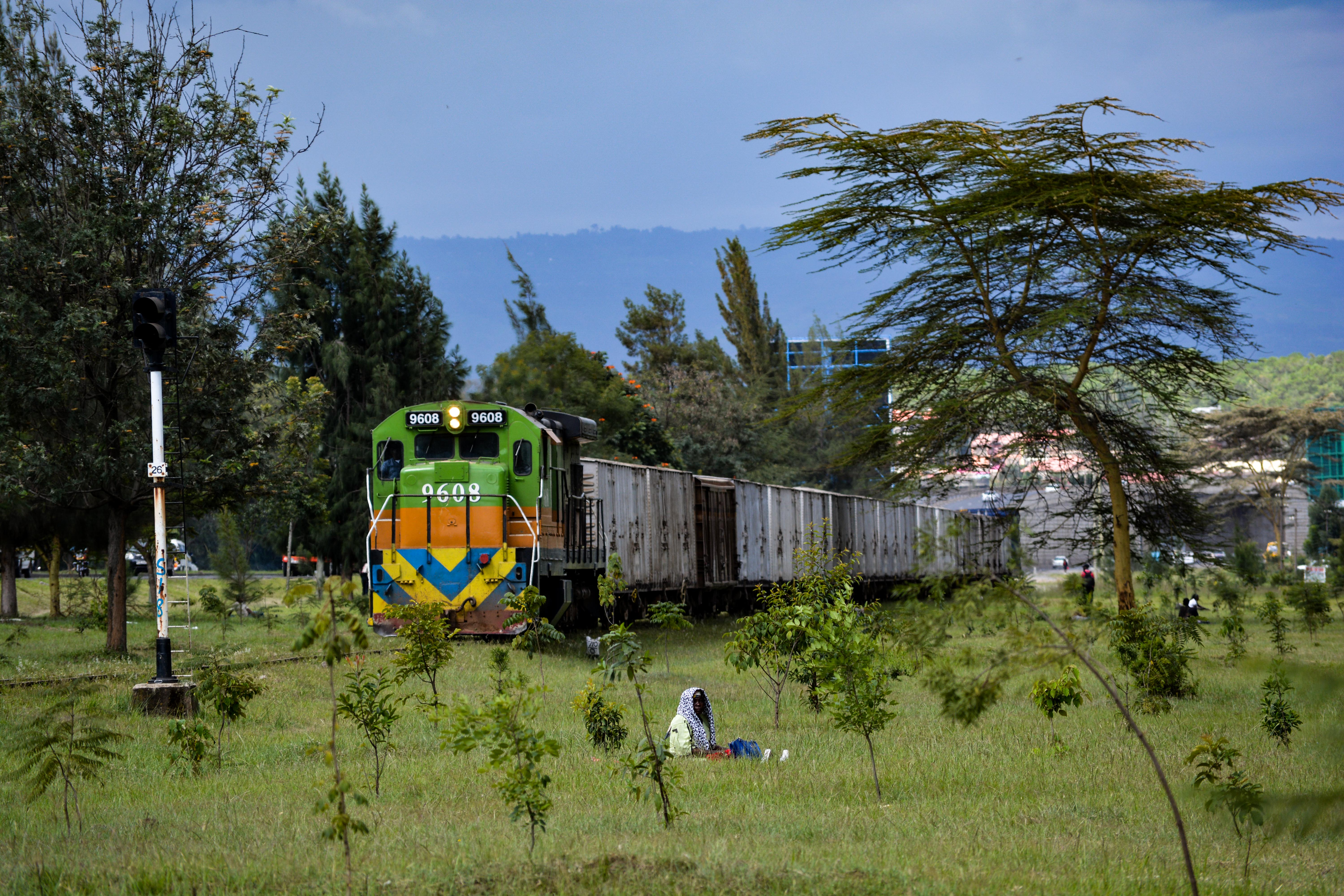
Train passing by Nakuru

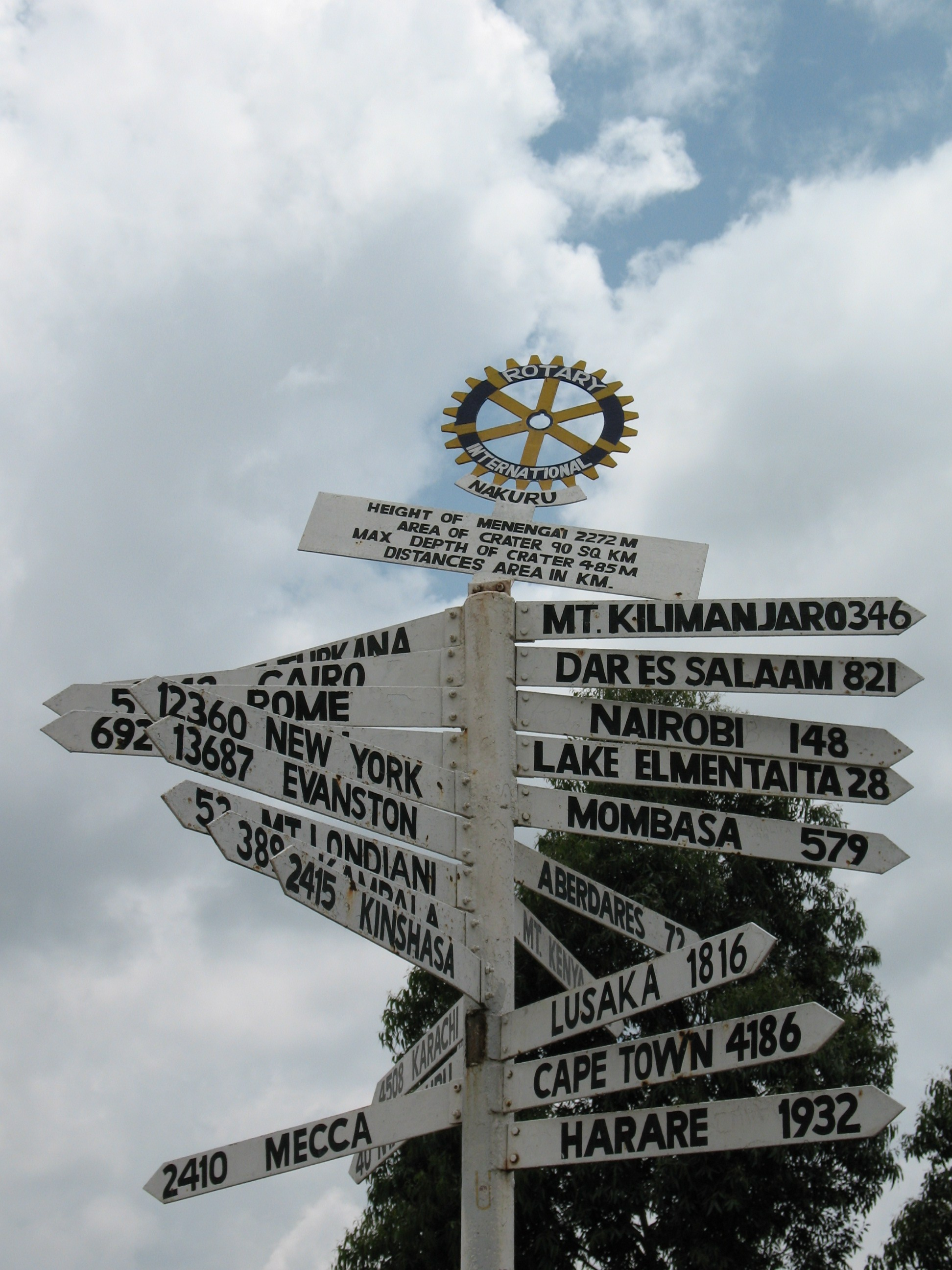
Signpost in Menengai Forest, Nakuru

=== Air ===
Nakuru is home to the Lanet Airstrip, later approved in 2017 to be upgraded to an international airport by the Ministry of Transport and the county government.

Nakuru is also home to Kabarak Airstrip, located 20 kilometres (12 mi) away from the city centre.

=== Road ===
Dondori Road C86 links the city to central Kenya. The Eldoret-Nairobi highway passes through this city, linking Uasin Gishu County with Nairobi.

=== Rail ===
The Rift Valley Railways narrow gauge track runs through the city with a railway station located on the edge of the CBD. It connects to cities Nairobi and Mombasa to the east, and Kisumu and Eldoret to the west.

== Tourism ==
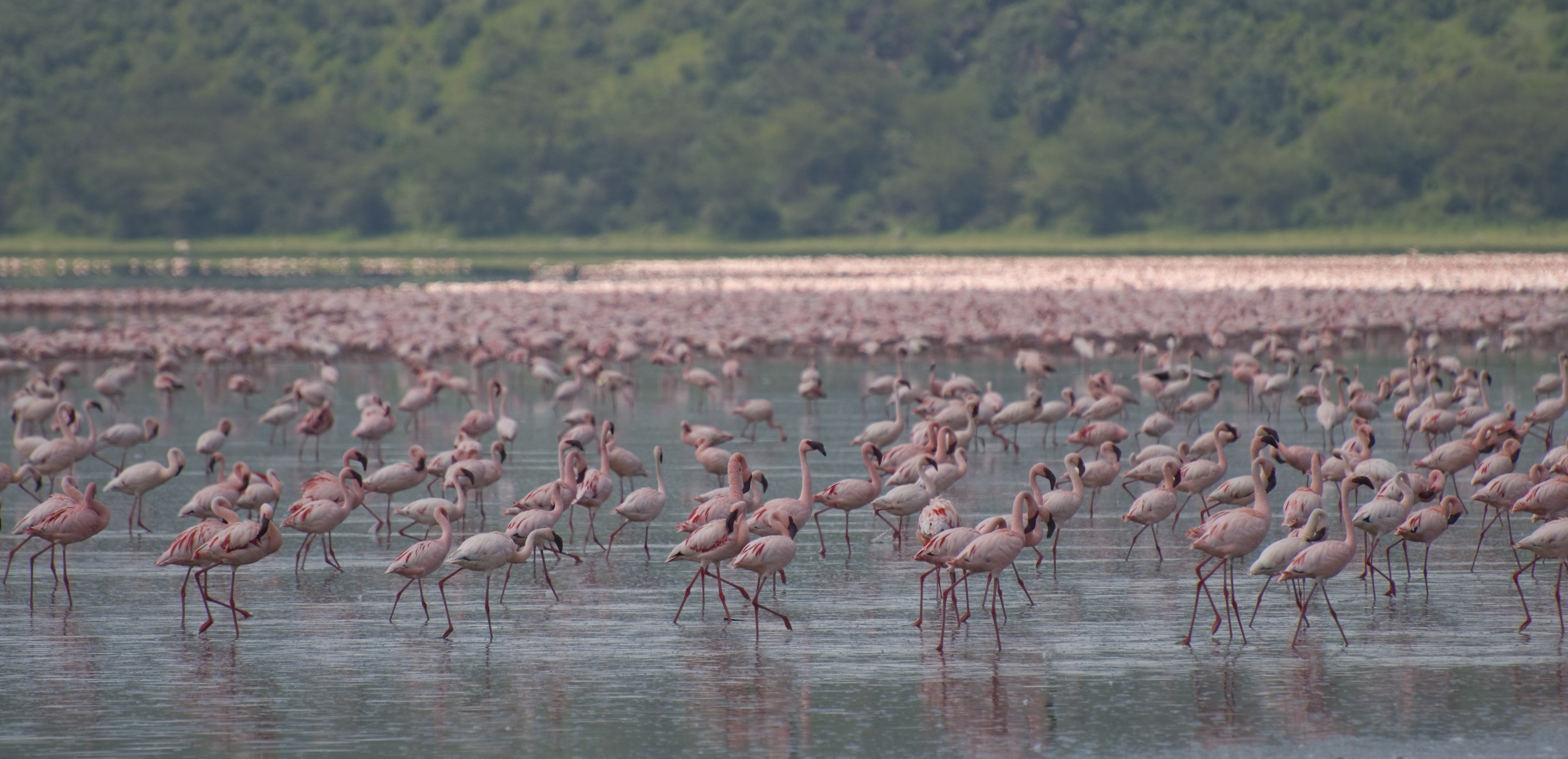
Flamingos on Lake Nakuru

Two kilometres south of the town of Nakuru is Lake Nakuru, one of the Rift Valley soda lakes, which forms part of the Lake Nakuru National Park. The park was declared a rhinoceros sanctuary in 1983 a Ramsar site in 1990, and as an Important Bird Area in 2009. The park is internationally known for its dense flamingo population. It is an important feeding site for great white pelicans that nest in nearby Lake Elmenteita. The park is home to over 450 species of birds and 56 mammal species, including Rothschild's giraffes.

Another point of interest includes Menengai Crater, a dormant volcano. Small fumaroles and steam vents can regularly be observed within the forested caldera from above. The second largest surviving volcanic crater in the world, it plunges 483 metres down from the rim, and the summit is accessible by walking or driving 8 kilometres to Nyahururu. The wood-covered crater ground is a nature reserve.

Nakuru's closest tourist destinations are Lake Bogoria and Lake Baringo in Baringo County.

The Hyrax Hill prehistoric site, discovered by the Leakeys in 1926, is considered a major Neolithic and Iron Age site. The adjoining museum features finds from various nearby excavations.

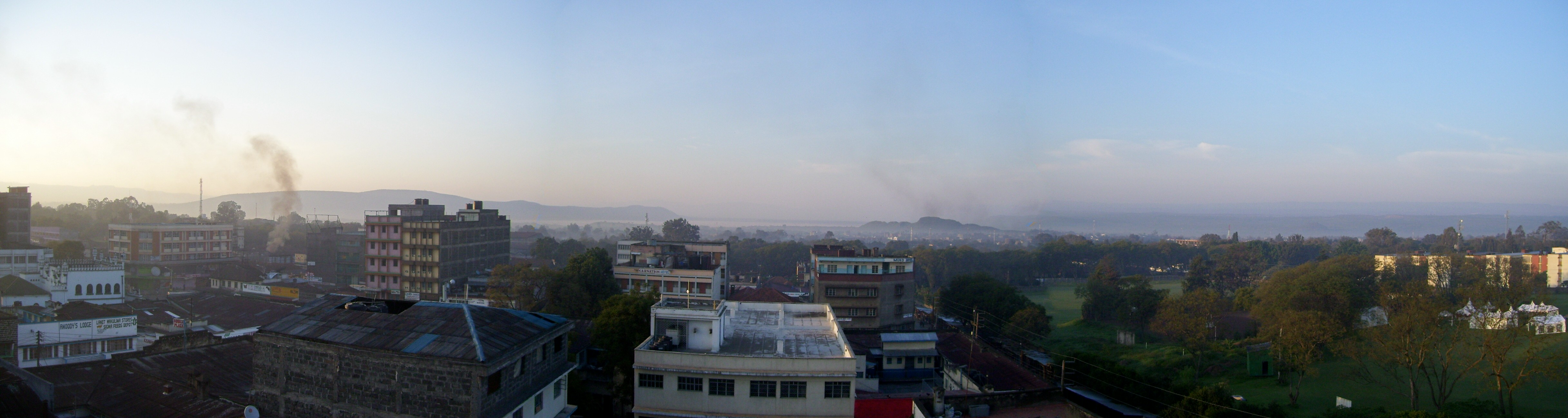
A section of the Nakuru skyline. Lake Nakuru is on the far end.

== Culture and contemporary life ==
=== Sports ===
Afraha Stadium is a multi-purpose stadium in Nakuru, Kenya. It is mainly used for football matches, and it is the home stadium of Nakuru AllStars — part of the Kenyan Premier League — and Ulinzi Stars of the Kenyan Premier League. The stadium holds 8,200 people and opened in 1948. It is two kilometres from Lake Nakuru National Park. In addition to being used for playing sports, Afraha Stadium hosted political meetings, including the GEMA promoted change The Constitution Series held in the 1970s. The former ruling party KANU also held many prominent meetings during the presidency of Daniel arap Moi.

The Rift Valley Sports Club lies in the centre of the city. The club was started in 1907 by European settlers who had settled in Nakuru in the early 1900s.

A motor racing track, Nakuru Park (not to be confused with the Langa Langa circuit near Gilgil), operated in the Lake View Estate area from 1956 until the mid 1980s.

== Demographics and surrounding towns ==
Nakuru is host to a diverse populace from across Kenya making it fit the description of a cosmopolitan city. The city consists predominantly of ethnic communities such as the Kikuyu people, Kalenjin, Luhya, Gusii, Luo, and people of Indian descent. Moreover, some settler families still live in the area today. However, the majority, about 70% of Nakuru's population is the Kikuyu community with the Kalenjin coming in second place. According to the 2019 Kenya Population Census, Nakuru had the third-largest urban population in Kenya.

The diverse populace of Nakuru makes it a hub for entrepreneurship. It also gives it a blend of cultures underpinning the city's culture of hospitality and cuisine.

Surrounding towns include the residential town Lanet, approximately 10 kilometres (6.2 mi) from Nakuru. Njoro lies 20 kilometres (12 mi) from Nakuru and is a small agricultural town with a local university aimed at promoting agricultural development in Kenya, namely Egerton University established in 1934.

== Government ==
Nakuru is the headquarters of Nakuru County. The current governor is Susan Kihika, and the Member of Parliament for the town is David Gikaria. The senator for Nakuru is Tabitha Karanja.

Alicen Chelaite was the first woman to serve as Mayor of Nakuru from 1996 to 1998.

== Sister cities ==
Nakuru is a sister city of East Orange, New Jersey, United States.

== See also ==
- Roman Catholic Diocese of Nakuru
- Railway stations in Kenya
- Nakuru County
- Lake Nakuru National Park
- Menengai Forest

== Bibliography ==
- Gordon Prain; et al., eds. (2010). African Urban Harvest: Agriculture in the Cities of Cameroon, Kenya and Uganda. Springer. ISBN 978-1-4419-6249-2. (Includes articles about Nakuru)
