= Menengai Forest =

Protected area in Kenya

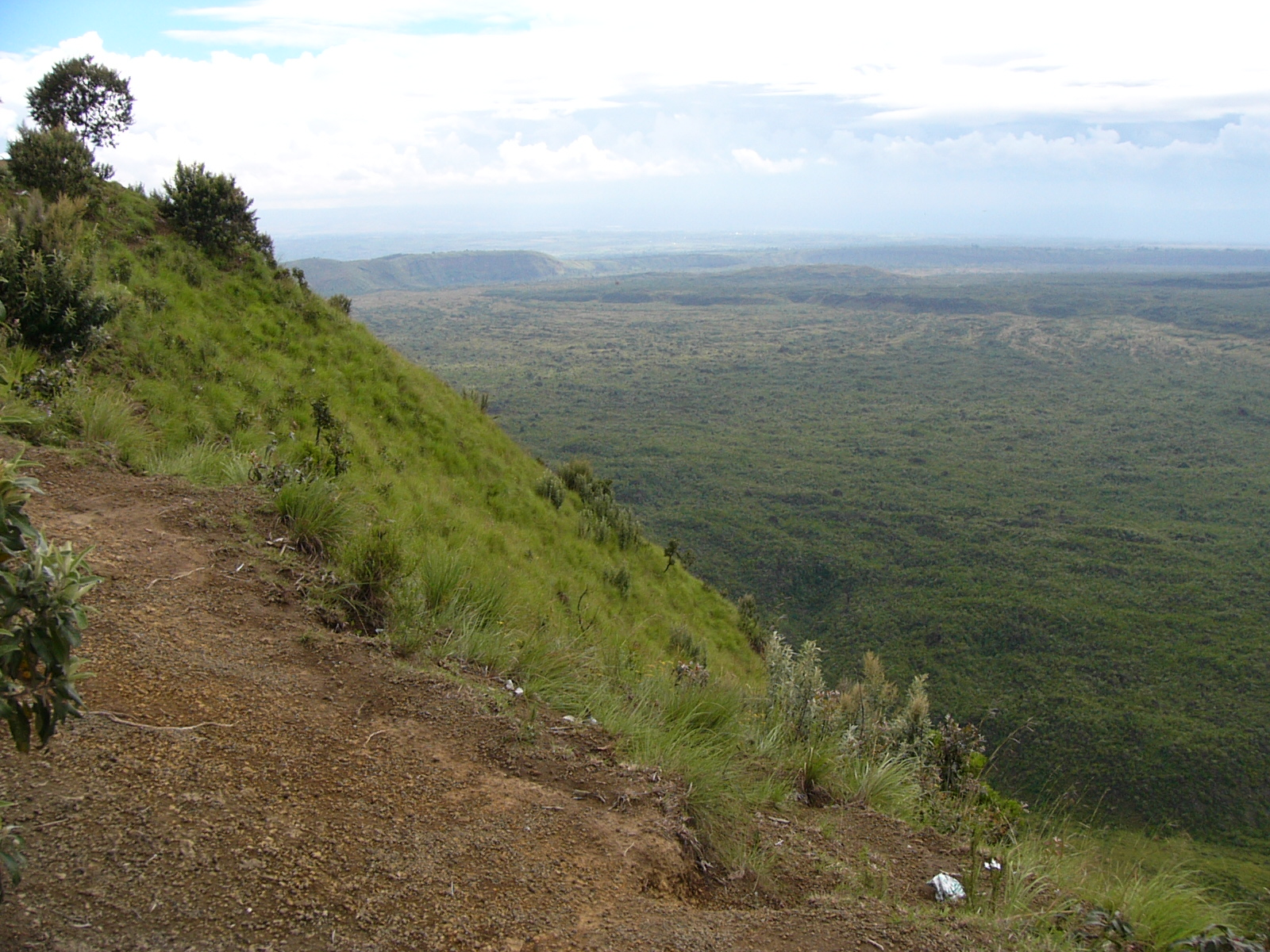
- View of the crater

- Location within Kenya
- Location: Nakuru County, Kenya
- Coordinates: 0°13′05″S 36°04′20″E
- Established: 1930
- Visitors: Over 650,000 visitors per year
- Governing body: Kenya Forest Service

Menengai Forest is a protected area situated within the town of Nakuru in Kenya. The Menengai Crater is within the forest. It was gazetted as a forest in the 1930s. It is surrounded by residential areas of Milimani Estate in the South, Ngachura and Bahati in the East, Solai in the North and Olo-Rongai in the West. Various Government of Kenya facilities have been hived off from the forest; these include the Kenya Broadcasting Corporation and the Nakuru G.K Prison. There is also a geothermal exploration project by the Geothermal Development Company inside the Menengai Crater floor.

== Altitude ==
It is situated in an elevated area which ranges from 1,900 to 2,300 metres (6,200 to 7,500 ft) above sea level.

== Area ==
The forest covers an area of about 7,000 hectares (17,297 acres). The actual forested area is about 2,000 hectares (4,942 acres).

== Flora ==
The main tree species in the forest are eucalyptus and acacia. Over 169 species of flowering plants and 17 species of grasses have been recorded in Menengai Forest. Example of flowering plants include leleshwa (Tarchonanthus camphoratus), Euphorbia species and Acacia species. Common grasses in the forest include geothermal grass (Fimbristylis exilis) and Boma Rhodes grass.

== Fauna ==
There are mammals, birds and insects. Mammal species include the tree hyrax, rock hyrax, olive baboon, black-faced vervet monkey, mountain reedbuck, Kirk's dik-dik and slender mongoose. Birds species include the Verreaux's eagle (only found in Menengai Forest in Nakuru), Abyssinian ground hornbill, lesser spotted eagle, African marsh harrier, Horus swift, turn-tailed ravens, red-winged sterling, and others. Other animals include spiders, molluscs and butterflies.

== Soils ==
The forest stands on soils derived from volcanic ash. The soil texture is mainly sandy and is very easily eroded.

== Management ==
The forest is under the management of the Kenya Forest Service in collaboration with the Menengai Community Forest Association

== Menengai Crater ==
The Menengai Crater is found within the forest. The possible date of formation of the Menengai Caldera was during the third and last major faulting of the Gregory Rift valley in the middle Pleistocene epoch of the Quaternary period less than one million years ago. This major faulting resulted in very complex grid patterns, dropping the Rift valley a further approximately 300 metres (984 ft) (from the original drops of approximately 1,200 metres (3,937 ft) and 900 metres (2,953 ft) with the first and second major faulting respectively). These latter minor faultings which both occurred during the upper Pleistocence led to the formation of new fractures and renewals on older fracture lines in Nakuru Basin and West of Lake Nakuru respectively.

The first minor faulting was accompanied by the emission of pumice showers from the Menengai Crater forming a pumice mantle, mainly on the western flank of Menengai. The pumice mantle forms a crudely stratified deposit, up to 15 metres (49 ft) thick. The pumice mantle was originally believed to represent the first stage in the formation of a caldera of the Krakatoan type. After reconsideration of the whole mechanism of caldera formation by comparing the form of Menengai with the form of the deeply eroded syenitic ring-complex west of Oslo, Norway it is now believed that cauldron subsidence and deep seated migration of magma were contributing factors. The process is envisaged as:

- Cauldron Subsidence - migration of magma at depth and fracturing of the retaining roof of the magma chamber
- Sudden lowering of pressure resultant on subsidence - rapid release of gas. Catastrophic eruption of gas-charged pumice from numerous fissures formed by subsidence
- Further collapse and engulfment of volcano super-structure - due to void formed by the evisceration process

Near Menengai summit, a few ejected blocks of these black vitreous lava are mixed with the pumice mantle on the outer slopes. To the south-west the lavas overlie the pumice mantle. The mode of origin of the pumice lapilli eruptives is not certain, but stratification, sorting and lack of lithic inclusions suggest vulcanian showers rather than flowing avalanches, and their concentration to the west of Menengai suggest a control by wind direction.

Later volcanic flows during the recent times (up to 2000 years ago) resulted in the formation of the Upper Menengai big lavas, which fill the caldera and are represented by trachyte lava flows and scoria cones. Trachyte lavas completely cover the floor of the caldera, concealing the rocks of the older volcano. The products of these late eruptions which are believed, from the complete absence of vegetation on some of the younger flows, to have continued up to the last few hundred years, have been described by McCall, 1957, p. 66.7. They form slaggy tongue- shaped flows emanating from various points in the caldera but mainly from the vicinity of the secondary summit and their flow was restricted by the caldera walls. They are characterized by beautifully developed pressure ridge patterns resembling those of a glacier. They include blocky flows apparently entirely composed of jumbled boulders, some massive flows, and also flows composed of twisted ropes of vitreous lavas. The lavas are characteristically black in colour and are for the most part vitreous, though they grade from nearly holocrystalline types to streaky obsidian. There are many conical piles of cinders of similar material within the caldera, but no well defined secondary crater. Similar cinder piles being products of their waning stage.

These upper lavas are almost entirely restricted within the caldera but have spilled out over the caldera rim on the outer slopes at two points. The most conspicuous overspill is close to a line of small craterlets South-West of nakuru and there may be some genetic connection. The massive trachyte exposed in the Amolak Sigh Quarry is believed to belong to the upper lava series, though unlike most of these late lavas it is holocrystallive. The overspill probably represents one of the very earliest of these second series eruptions. The later lava seems to continue down the caldera wall into the caldera, and this may well be a ring feeder structure similar to the famous backward flow Crater Lake, USA, a ring feeder actually cut through by the caldera fault. Similar structures are seen in Mount Suswa caldera.

== Gallery ==
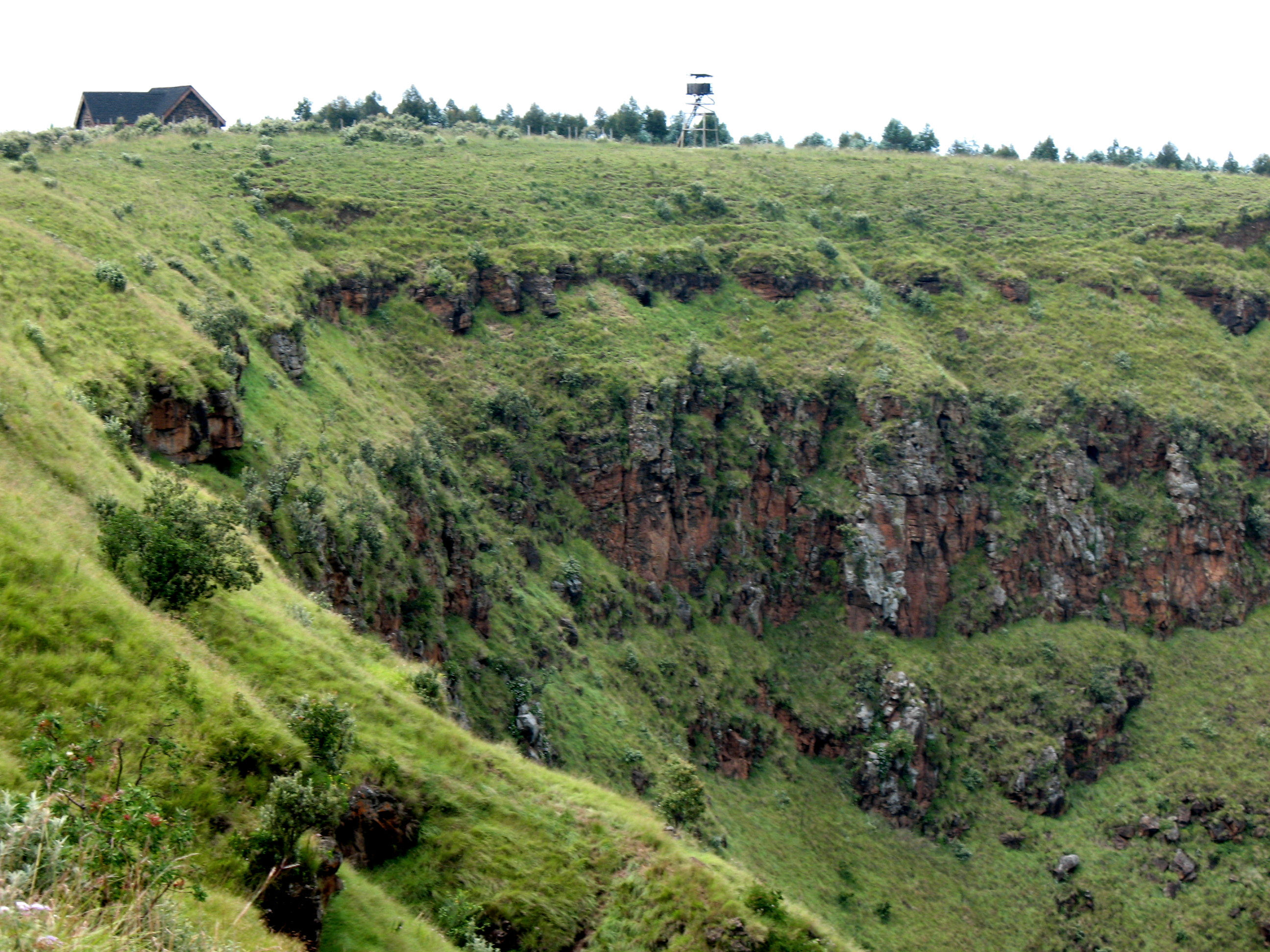
Menengai Crater

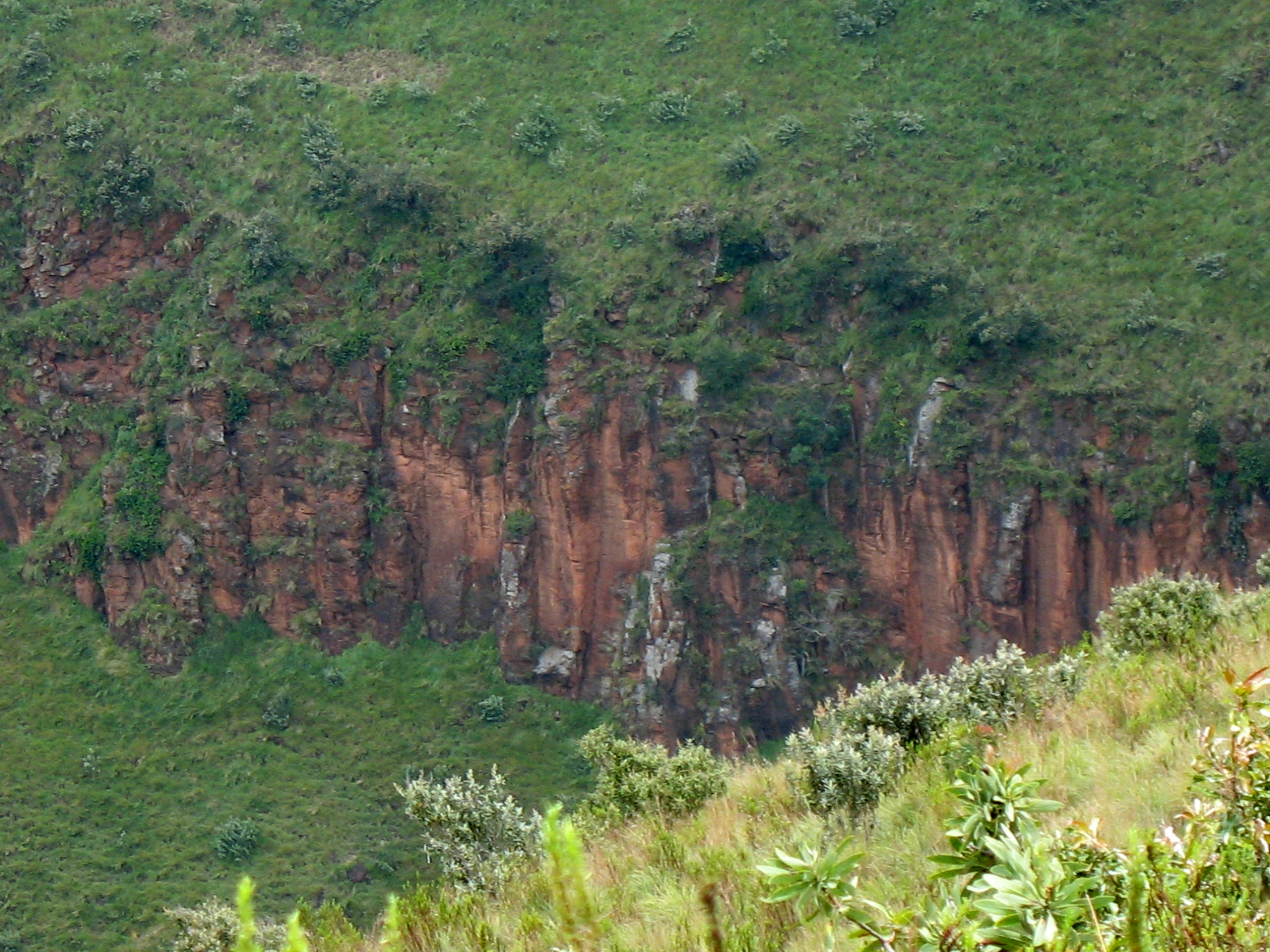
Menengai Crater

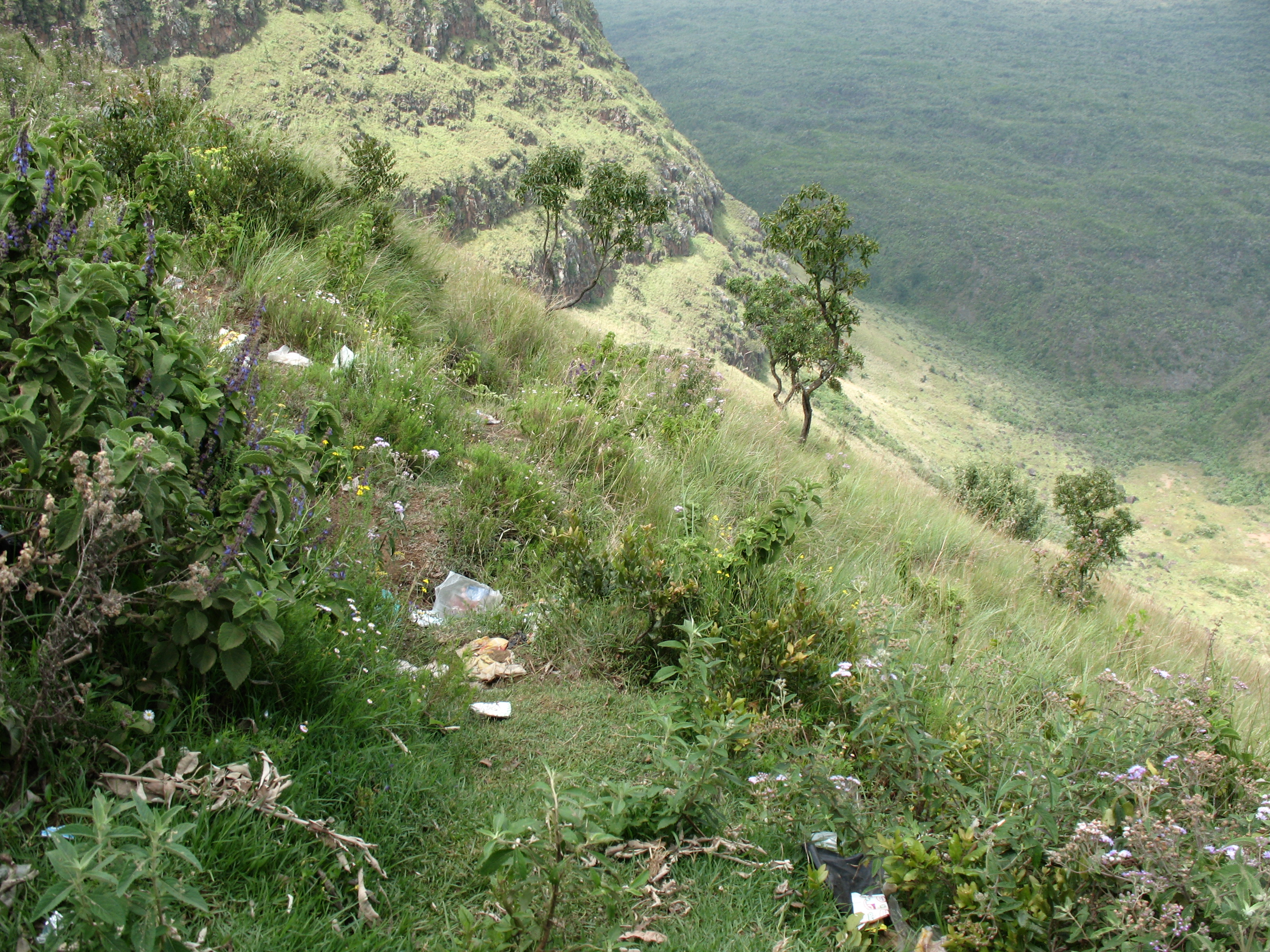
Menengai Crater

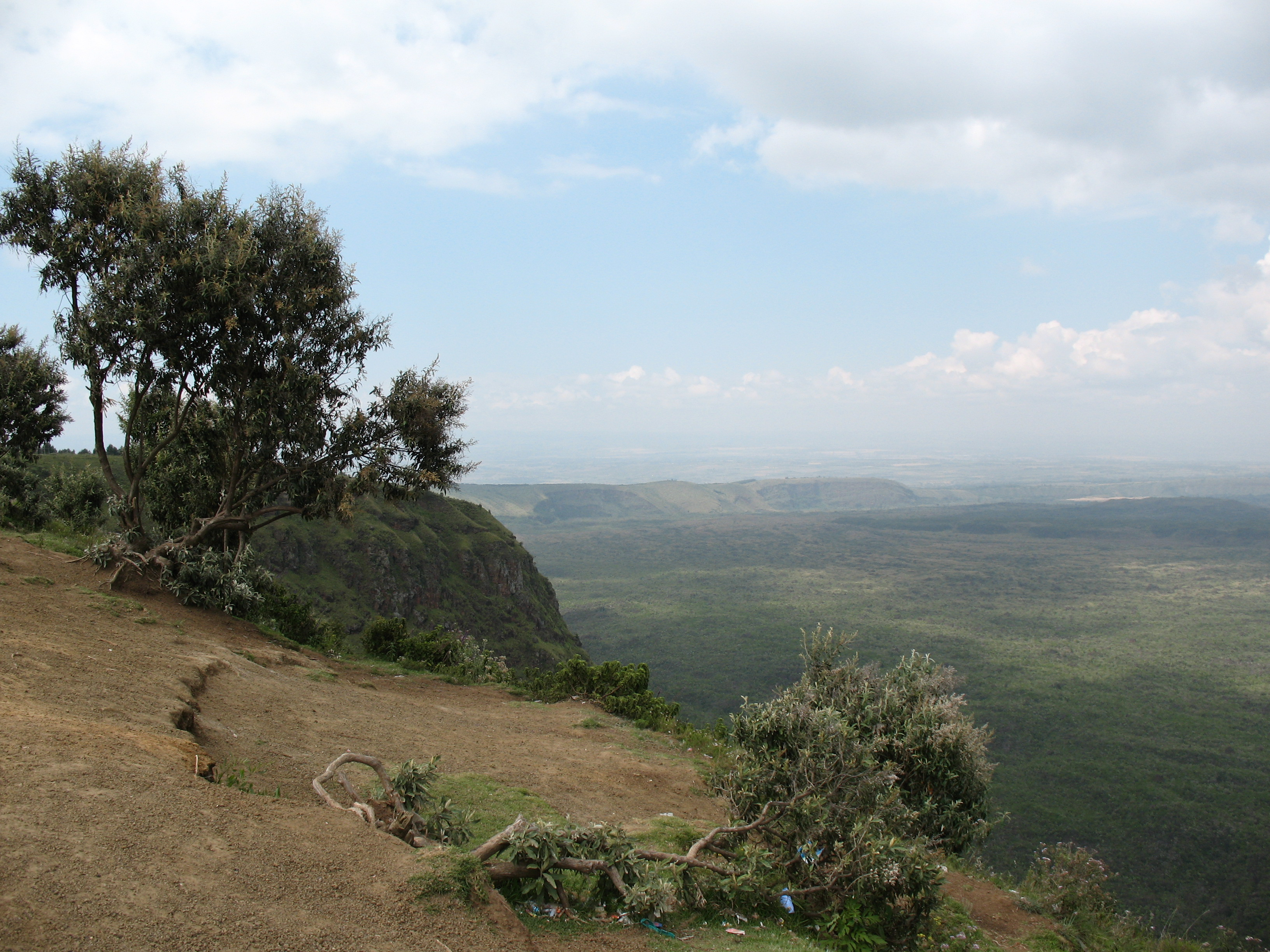
Menengai Crater

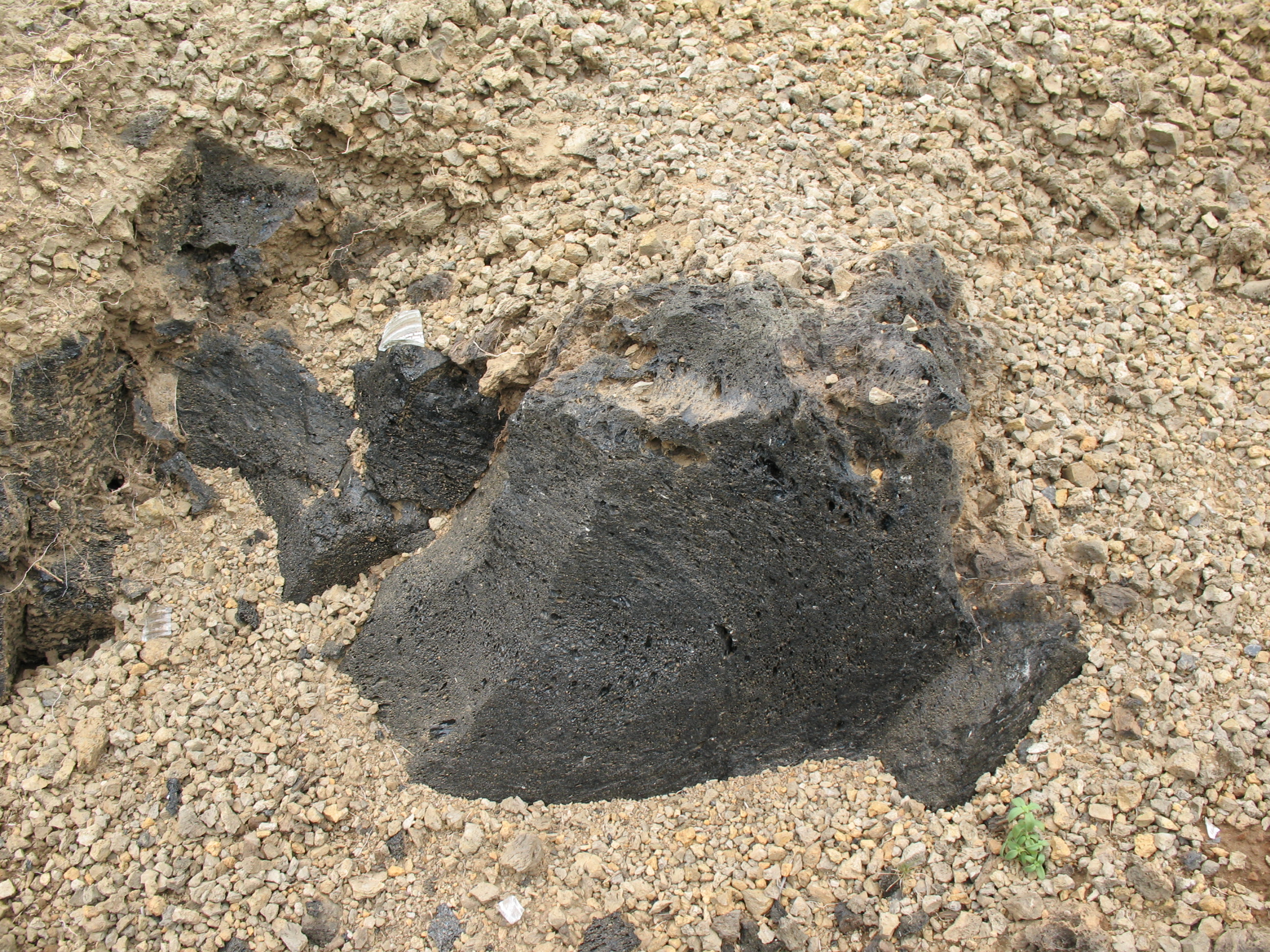
Black vitreous lava

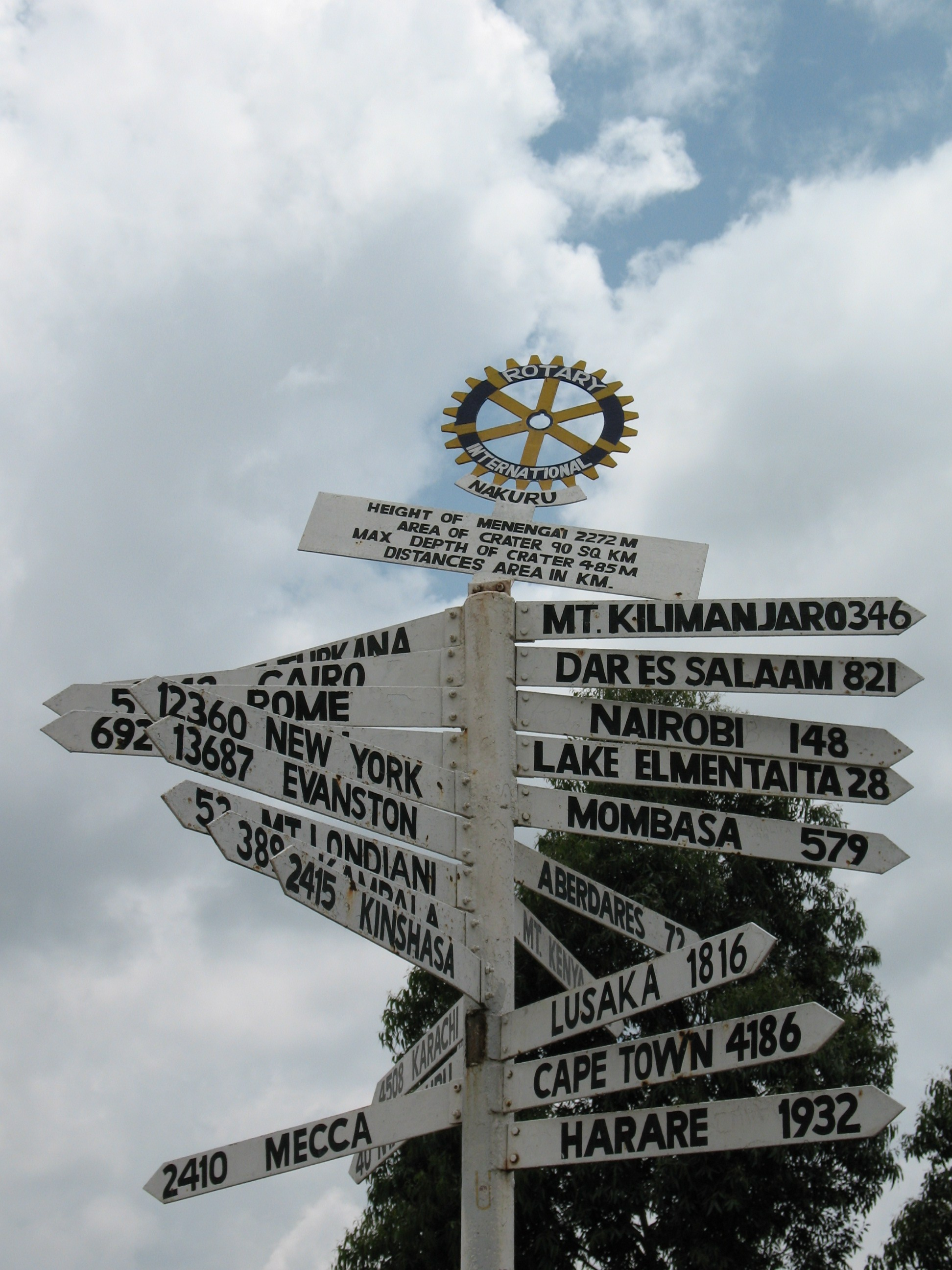
Menengai Forest summit
