= Menengai =

Shield volcano in Kenya

Menengai Crater
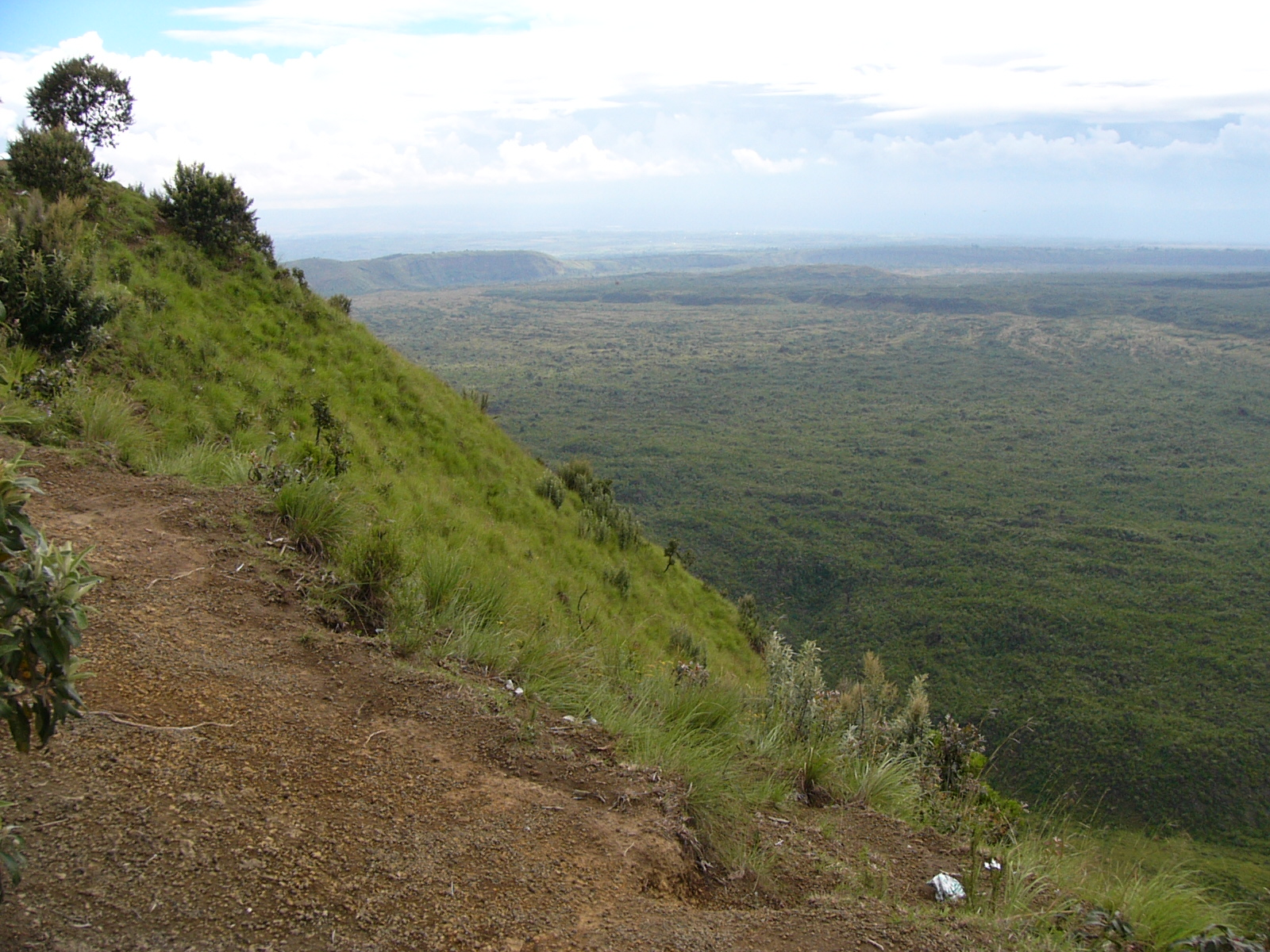
- Menengai Crater - view from the edge

Highest point
- Elevation: 2,278 m (7,474 ft)
- Coordinates: 0°12′S 36°04′E

Geography
- Location within Kenya
- Location: Nakuru County, Kenya

Geology
- Formed by: Volcanism along the Gregory Rift
- Mountain type: Shield volcano
- Last eruption: 6050 BCE (?)

Climbing
- Easiest route: via taking the north east route for bus

Menengai Crater is a massive shield volcano with one of the biggest calderas in the world, in the Great Rift Valley, Kenya. It is the largest volcano caldera in Kenya and the second largest volcano caldera in Africa. Volcanic formed rich loam soils enrich the adjacent farmland around its flanks. The crater is on the floor of the Rift Valley. The volcano formed about 200,000 years ago and the prominent 12 x 8 km caldera formed about 8000 years ago. The caldera floor is covered with numerous post caldera lava flows. The Menengai volcano is considered one of the best-preserved Krakatau-style calderas in the world. Menengai has very little sediment in the caldera which is a thick mass of lava boulders and inaccessible ridges. Volcanic activity continues and a current project under the Geothermal Development Company is at an advanced stage towards geothermal power generation.

Menengai is 10 km (6 mi) north of Nakuru, the fourth-biggest city in Kenya.

== See also ==
- List of volcanoes in Kenya
- Menengai Forest
- Railway stations in Kenya

== See also ==
- "Menengai". Global Volcanism Program. Smithsonian Institution.
