= Ikotos County =

- County
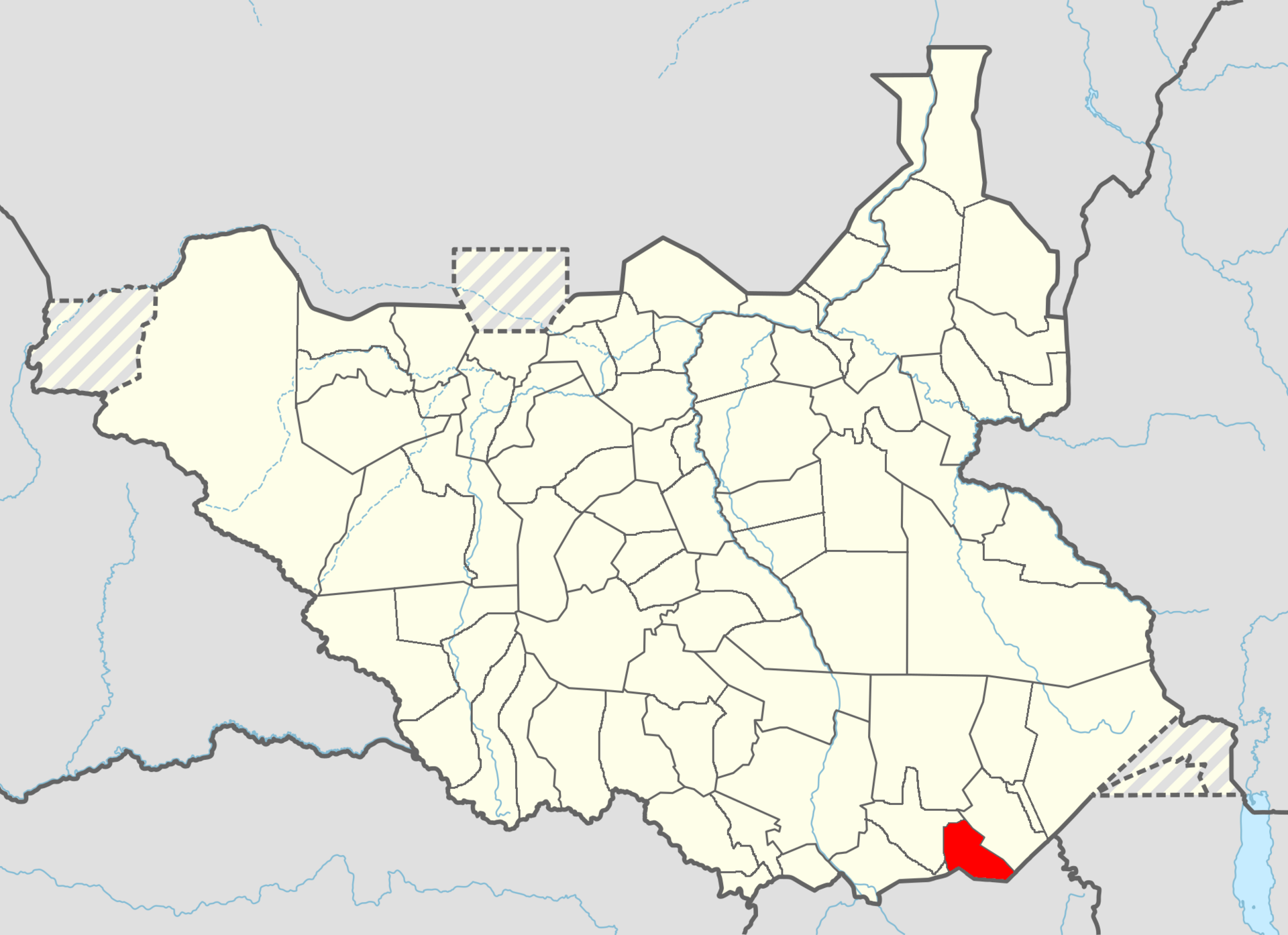
- Location in South Sudan
- Coordinates: 4°4′42″N 33°6′32″E
- Country: South Sudan
- Region: Equatoria
- State: Eastern Equatoria
- Headquarters: Ikotos

Government
  - County Commissioner: Loboi Timon Lolori

Area
  - Total: 3,512 km^{2} (1,356 sq mi)

Population (2017 estimate)
  - Total: 129,620
  - Density: 36.91/km^{2} (95.59/sq mi)
- Time zone: UTC+2 (CAT)

Ikotos County is an administrative area in the Eastern Equatoria state of South Sudan with headquarters in the town of Ikotos. The people, who live in the county's area by subsistence agriculture and cattle herding, are poverty-stricken. Years of civil war have made violence commonplace: most people have experienced the murder of a close family member. In 2009, AK-47 rifles were used in 42 per cent of killings.

== Location ==
Ikotos County is in the south of Eastern Equatoria state, adjoining the Ugandan border to the south, Magwi county to the west, Torit county to the north, and Budi county to the east. Ikotos County was part of Torit County until 2004. The county is administratively divided into six payams, which are further sub-divided into bomas. Payams are Hatire, Losite, Ikwoto Central, Imatong, Lomohidang and Lomohidang North.

The county contains the Imatong Mountains in their entirety, which includes the highest peak in Sudan, Mount Hinati at 3,187 metres (10,456 ft). The mountains rise steeply from the surrounding plains, which are at an elevation of 1,000 metres (3,300 ft) on the South Sudan-Uganda border, sloping down gradually to the north. These plains are crossed by many streams, separated by low, rounded ridges, and dotted with small gneiss hills, outliers of the main mountain range. The mountains are sharply faulted and are the source of many year-round rivers.

Average annual rainfall in the mountains is about 1,500 millimetres (4.9 ft) The plains and the lower parts of the mountains are covered by deciduous woodland, wooded grassland and bamboo thickets to the north and west. The areas to the east and southeast are in the rain shadow of the mountains, with dry arid grassland or deciduous or semi-evergreen bush.

== People ==
Eastern Equatoria State – Ikwoto county in the southwest

In 2002 the Sudan Relief and Rehabilitation Association, the humanitarian wing of the Sudan People's Liberation Movement, estimated that the population was 67,340, including internally displaced persons. An estimate of the population of the county in mid-2010 was 88,536 in 17,280 households, 90% engaged in agriculture. Total cereal harvested area was 14,774 hectares (36,510 acres).

The county's area is home to the Ketebo, Dongotono, Imotong, Logir, Otuho, Lango: Lokwa & Lorwama. The Lango tribe has two sub-tribes – the Lango, Lorwama. The Lango keep cattle and cultivate millet, melons, sweet potatoes, beans, bananas, tobacco. The Ketebo live in Bira which include Lotome, Nakoringole, Lofus, Ateda/ Madiel, Lorum, Napeyase, Longairo, Osisi, Toomodo, Okosio, Ofi, Lobila Tome, Kamulach, Kalabe, Narus Bokolore, Lorife, Lonyili, Irobi, Lojilingare, etc. while the Dongotona live in dense settlements, cultivate sorghum, groundnuts, simsim, telebun, and sweet potatoes, and keep large herds of cattle, sheep and goats.

Cattle play a central role in social life, used in contracting marriages and performing rituals, and exchanged as gifts. The tribes have always indulged in cattle raiding, particularly during the dry season when the grass is short and cattle can be moved faster. There have always been conflicts between the tribes, notably in the Kidepo valley, using the traditional weapons of spears and sticks. In the past, the number of lives lost was limited, and peace would soon be made through formal ceremonies.

The people of the region live by subsistence agriculture, mostly growing sorghum and millet, and livestock raising. 90% of the agricultural work is undertaken by women using hand tools. Crops are generally rain-fed, with no irrigation, making them vulnerable to reduced rainfall or drought in either of the two growing seasons. Fishing, natural resource exploitation, mining and trade are practiced in a small way. The people live in extreme poverty with no rights of land tenure, and chronic insecurity. There is no infrastructure and no legal framework to make investment practical.

== Colonial era ==
Sir Samuel Baker in hunting attire with trophies of rhino and buffalo.

Little is known of the Lango country before the arrival of Europeans. The explorer Samuel Baker was the first European to visit the region, travelling in the northwest and west of the area in 1863. He visiting Tarrangolle (Tirangore) and observed unnamed mountains to the south. Later he passed through these mountains, the western Acholi range of the Imatongs. Baker formally annexed the region around the upper Nile for the Khedive of Egypt in 1871. In 1878 Emin Pasha was appointed Bey of Equatoria, then nominally under Egyptian control, with his base at Lado. In 1881, Emin Pasha made a trip from Gondokoro on the Nile to Tirangore, and from there travelled south along the eastern side of the Imatong mountains along the valley of the Koss River, past the village of Ikwoto and then southwest to the Nile. Emin Pasha was cut off from Egypt by the revolt of Muhammad Ahmad in the northern Sudan, which began in 1881, and in 1885 withdrew to the south.

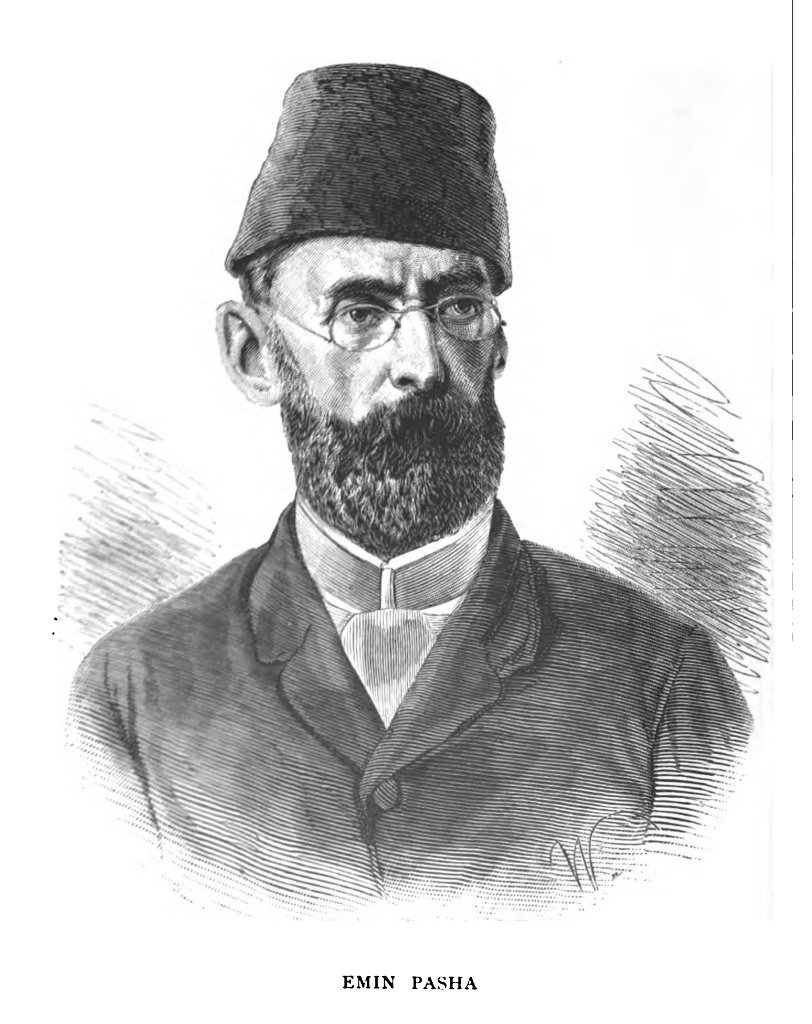
Eduard Schnitzer aka Emin Pasha, the first European ruler of Ikwoto

Chief Lomoro Xujang was ruler of the Lotuko of Tirrangore from 1892, and extended his authority over all the Lotuko people and their neighbors. He cooperated with the Ugandan government, which sent Colonel (Later Major General) J.R.L. Macdonald on a patrol into his country, and which later set up a post at Ikwoto. Xujang aroused opposition for his dictatorial ways, and was assassinated in 1912. Following the defeat of Muhammad Ahmad in 1898, the region came under the British Protectorate of Uganda in 1899. In 1914 it was transferred to the Anglo-Egyptian Sudan.

The first rough topographical map was published in 1917 by H. Pellew-Wright, a District Commissioner of Uganda who crossed the Imatong mountains from northeast to southwest, but the official map of the Anglo-Egyptian Sudan in 1922 only showed the outlines of the Imatong mountains in the heart of present-day Ikwoto county. In 1929 the botanist Thomas Ford Chipp, then deputy director of the Royal Botanic Gardens at Kew, reached the peak of Kinyeti. The same year he published a report on the flora with several photographs. The first detailed map appeared in 1931. The region remained isolated and underdeveloped. Sudan became independent in 1956, but a year earlier civil disturbances had broken out in the southern regions that did not want to come under control of the Arab-dominated government in Khartoum.

== Civil war years ==
Ikwoto was relatively untouched by the fighting in the First Sudanese Civil War (1955–1972). During the Second Sudanese Civil War (1983–2005) large areas of Eastern Equatoria State were ravaged by fighting between the Sudanese Armed Forces and the Sudan People’s Liberation Army (SPLA), and by many armed groups supported by both sides. In the late 1980s many Lango civilians were displaced to camps in government-controlled areas including Torit, Juba and Khartoum, and others to refugee camps in Uganda and Kenya. The SPLM was not always united. For example, the Nuer leader William Nyuon Bany defected from the SPLM mainstream in September 1992. He withdrew his forces from Pageri towards the SPLA headquarters at Magwi, which he attacked and captured. In early 1993 Nyuon captured Ikwoto, holding several women hostage before turning them over to Ugandan authorities. Control of Ikwoto changed hands several times. In November 1993 Nyuon was again attacking SPLA troops around Ikwoto. The influx of SPLA fighters and government troops led to a sharp rise in the number of guns available, and to their use in cattle raids and murders. Ambushes, rapes and killings by tribesmen armed with Kalashnikovs or even rocket launchers became common through the 1990s and into the 2000s.

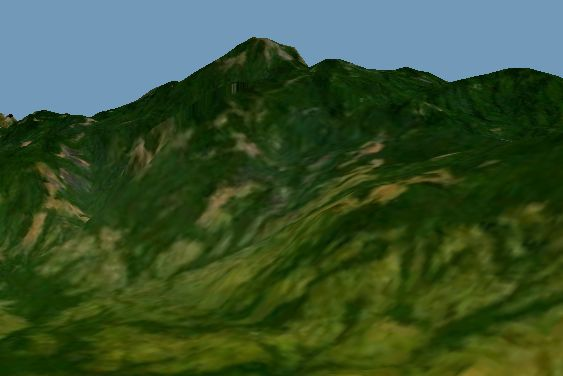
Mount Kinyeti in the Imatong Mountains, the highest peak in South Sudan. The mountains were a haven for the Lord's Resistance Army.

The security problem was compounded by the presence of the Ugandan rebel group, the Lord's Resistance Army (LRA), notorious for killing, looting for food, destroying property and abducting women and children. In 1986 the government of Sudan had started to provide arms, training and sanctuary for the LRA, who began to raid and plunder villages along the Sudan – Uganda border. In February 1993 a major shipment of arms arrived in Kitgum, Uganda, for transit to the SPLA in Ikwoto. In return, the SPLA began to help Uganda in their ineffectual attempts to suppress the LRA.

Over 400 people were massacred by the LRA in the Imotong area in the west of Ikwoto county in March 2002. Faced with this threat, the people refused to hand over their guns, which they needed for self-defense. In May 2002 the area around Ikwoto was a no-go zone for aid workers. The steep, gully-filled and densely forested mountains provided a natural haven for remnants of the LRA. After the LRA clashed with the Uganda People's Defence Force in October 2002, Uganda closed the road being used by aid workers to carry supplies from Kitgum to Ikwoto.

In May 2003 the Imatong and Ikwoto districts, then in Torit County, reported 178 suspected cases of Yellow Fever and 27 deaths. On a positive note, during this period Norwegian Church Aid made a significant contribution with the Ikwoto County Education Centre, which trained 120 teachers in 2004 and 2005.

== Post war ==
An uneasy peace between the SPLA and government of Sudan was established in January 2005. The region suffered from an outbreak of Cholera in the first half of 2006. The village of Ikotos reported 3,359 cholera infections and 103 deaths out of its population of 8,000. Aid workers were at risk of being ambushed and killed by the LRA. The LRA finally withdrew from the county in April 2007.

The local authorities started to tighten up gun controls. However, by May 2006 an estimated ten people per day were being killed. On 14–18 May 2006 the community leaders in the county came together for a peace and reconciliation meeting. They signed a declaration committing to eliminate all obstacles to the unity of the six Lango tribes and set up a task force to implement recommendations for keeping the peace. The prolonged violence has disrupted families, destroyed trust and has often created a passion for vengeance. Economic growth has been minimal, even compared to neighboring counties such as Budi, and many people have failed to obtain a formal education.

The violence did not cease with the ending of the war. Continued violent crimes included ambushes to obtain firearms, cattle raids to obtain bride price, and retaliatory raids to obtain revenge. In November and December 2009 a survey was conducted of almost 2,400 households in the adjacent Torit, Magwi, and Ikotos counties. Results showed high levels of violence throughout the region, but particularly in Ikotos. 63% of households in Ikotos said they owned a firearm. Actual numbers may be much higher, with all households possessing at least one firearm and some as many as eight. The main security providers were said to be traditional leaders (90%), followed by neighbors (48%), religious leaders (38%), police (27%) and the SPLA (6%). This indicates massive distrust of the security forces which are considered both corrupt and weak. Almost one third of the Ikotos respondents said there had been an incident of crime or armed violence against one of their household members in the last year, 47% of these being killings.

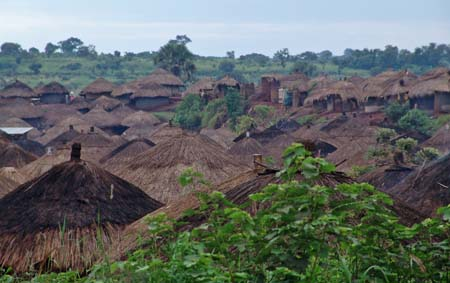
Palenga IDP camp, Gulu District, northern Uganda in October 2006

In 2007 the Lutheran World Federation (LWF) implemented an emergency response project that provided food, agricultural tools, crop seeds, and non-food items to refugee returnees, Internally Displaced People (IDPs) and the resident communities in Ikotos country. The project also helped local government authorities to build their capacity, and constructed boreholes and schools. Between April 2007 and March 2008 an estimated 3,700 IDP households and 12,000 refugee returnee households moved to Ikotos, some assisted by the UNHCR, and numbers were expected to increase.

Conditions for returnees have been difficult, in some cases much harder than in the IDP camps. Despite help from charities, returnees faced difficulty obtaining seeds, and then faced the normal problems of drought or excess rain. In September 2009 the Food and Agriculture Organization published a mid-season crop and food security assessment for Southern Sudan. It reported that a prolonged dry spell from late April until July and erratic rainfall had caused the first season harvest to fail completely in parts of Ikotos and other parts of Eastern Equatoria, and farmers had lost hope in the second season crop. The most affected areas included Lomohindang South, Losite, and parts of Imatong and Lomohindang North in Ikotos.

The Ikotos Teacher Training College opened in March 2010, with the capacity to train, house and feed 50 teachers, a joint project of the charities All Nations Christian Care and World Emergency Relief. In September 2010 Ikotos County Commissioner Peter Lokenge Lotone stated that there had recently been a decrease in violence, attributing the improvement to cooperation between county authorities and the youth, women, elders and chiefs in catching thieves. In January 2011 leaders of the Lango communities gathered in Torit for a three-day reconciliation meeting that had been organized by the Lango of Juba, aiming to restore unity following disputes in the past year's elections. The leaders also passed a resolution to eliminate cattle rustling, in part by launching vocational training institutions for youths of the county.

In the January 2011 referendum on independence in Ikotos county five votes were cast for unity with northern Sudan while 57,041 were cast for secession as a separate state of South Sudan.
