= Geography of South Sudan =

Geography of The Republic of South Sudan
- Continent: Africa
- Coordinates: 05°N 31°E
- Area: Ranked 45th
  - Total: 644,329 km^{2} (248,777 sq mi)
- Borders: Total land borders: Sudan (1,937 km); Central African Republic (682 km); Ethiopia (883 km); Kenya (232 km); Uganda (435 km); Democratic Republic of Congo (628 km)
- Highest point: Kinyeti; 3,187 m (10,456.0 ft)
- Lowest point: White Nile; 381 m (1,250.0 ft)
- Longest river: White Nile

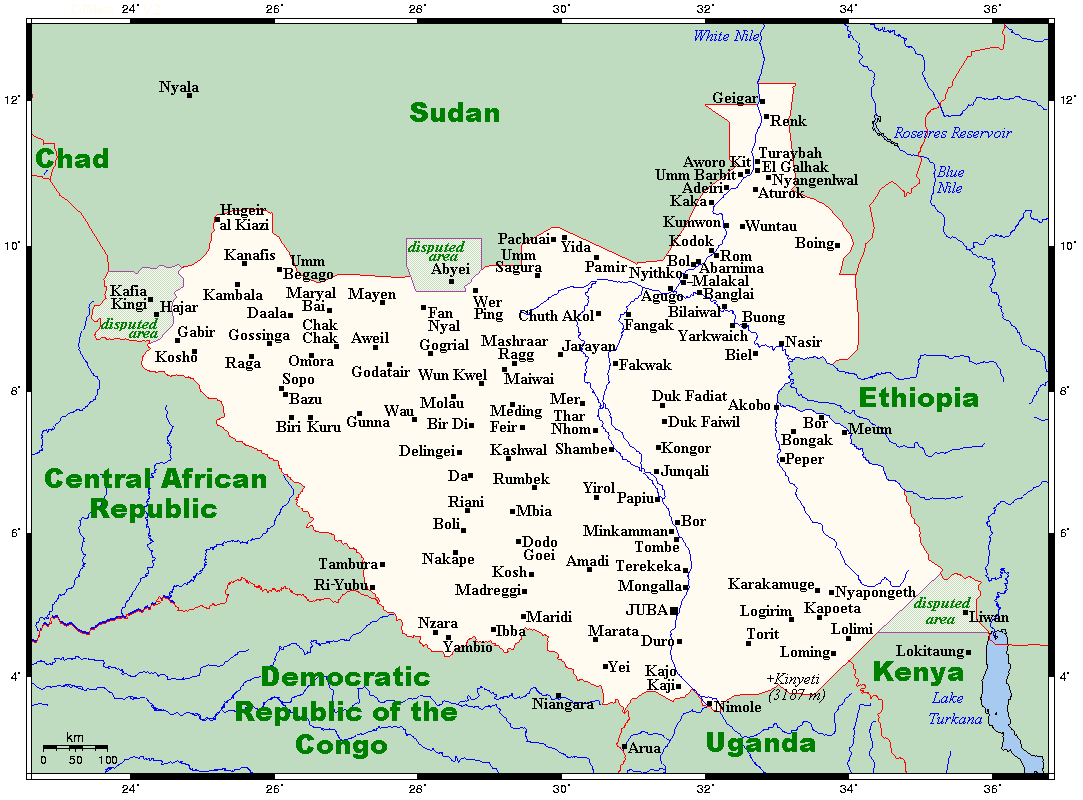
A map of South Sudan, showing towns, cities, and disputed areas on its borders.

The geography of South Sudan describes the physical features of South Sudan, a country in East Africa. South Sudan is a landlocked country and borders – clockwise – Sudan from the north, Ethiopia from the east, Kenya, Uganda and the Democratic Republic of the Congo from the south and the Central African Republic from the west.

Until July 9, 2011, it was part of Sudan, then the largest country in Africa before a referendum took place in January 2011.

== Area and boundaries ==
Area
- Total: 644,329 km²
  - country rank in the world: 45th
- Land: N/A km²
- Water: N/A km²

Area comparative
- Australia comparative: approximately 4/5 the size of New South Wales
- Canada comparative: slightly smaller than Alberta
- United States comparative: slightly smaller than Texas
- EU comparative: slightly more than twice the size of Poland

The length of South Sudan's borders is 4,797 kilometers (2,981 mi). Bordering countries are (with boundary length):

- Central African Republic (682 km/424 mi)
- Democratic Republic of the Congo (628 km/390 mi)
- Ethiopia (883 km/549 mi)
- Kenya (232 km/144 mi)
- Sudan (1,937 km/1,204 mi)
- Uganda (435 km/270 mi)

== Topography ==
South Sudan map of Köppen climate classification.

The geomorphology of much of South Sudan and in particular towards the Nile-Congo watershed is made up a single large pediplain, extensive flat area made of coalesced pediments. Heights that rise above this pediplain contain laterite soils, sometimes with pisolites or ferricrete, and are remnants of an older surface. Some of the summits corresponding to the said old surface were formed by relief inversion of valleys.

=== Mountains ===
The Imatong Mountains are located in the southeast of South Sudan in the state of Eastern Equatoria, and extend into Uganda. Mount Kinyeti is the highest mountain of the range at 3,187 metres (10,456 ft), and the highest in the whole of South Sudan. The range has an equatorial climate and had dense montane forests supporting diverse wildlife. In recent years the rich ecology has been severely degraded by forest clearance and subsistence farming, leading to extensive erosion of the steep slopes.

=== Environments ===
South Sudan's protected area of Bandingilo National Park hosts the second-largest wildlife migration in the world. Surveys have revealed that Boma National Park, west of the Ethiopian border, as well as the Sudd wetland and Southern National Park near the border with Congo, provided habitat for large populations of hartebeest, kob, topi, buffalo, elephants, giraffes, and lions.

South Sudan's forest reserves also provided habitat for bongo, giant forest hogs, red river hogs, forest elephants, chimpanzees, and forest monkeys. Surveys begun in 2005 by WCS in partnership with the semi-autonomous government of Southern Sudan revealed that significant, though diminished wildlife populations still exist, and that, astonishingly, the huge migration of 1.3 million antelopes in the southeast is substantially intact.

Habitats in the country include grasslands, high-altitude plateaus and escarpments, wooded and grassy savannas, floodplains, and wetlands. Associated wildlife species include the endemic white-eared kob and Nile Lechwe, as well as elephants, giraffes, common eland, giant eland, oryx, lions, African wild dogs, cape buffalo, and topi (locally called tiang). Little is known about the white-eared kob and tiang, both types of antelope, whose magnificent migrations were legendary before the civil war. The Boma-Jonglei Landscape region encompasses Boma National Park, broad pasturelands and floodplains, Bandingilo National Park, and the Sudd, a vast area of swamp and seasonally flooded grasslands that includes the Zeraf Wildlife Reserve.

Several ecoregions extend across South Sudan: the East Sudanian savanna, Northern Congolian forest–savanna mosaic, Saharan flooded grasslands (Sudd), Sahelian Acacia savanna, East African montane forests, and the Northern Acacia–Commiphora bushlands and thickets.

== Political geography ==
The administrative subdivisions of South Sudan grouped in the three historical provinces of: Bahr el Ghazal Equatoria Greater Upper Nile

As of February 2020, South Sudan is divided into 10 states, two administrative areas, and one area with special administrative status. All together, they correspond to three historical regions of the Sudan: Bahr el Ghazal, Equatoria, and Greater Upper Nile.

=== Bahr el Ghazal ===
1. Western Bahr el Ghazal
2. Northern Bahr el Ghazal
3. Warrap
4. Lakes
5. Abyei (area with special administrative status)nuba mountain

=== Equatoria ===
1. Eastern Equatoria
2. Central Equatoria
3. Western Equatoria

=== Greater Upper Nile ===
1. Unity
2. Upper Nile
3. Jonglei
4. Pibor Administrative Area
5. Ruweng Administrative Area

Location of South Sudan

=== Disputed areas ===
1. Abyei Area, a small region of South Sudan bordering the Sudan. It is neared to South Sudanese states of Northern Bahr el Ghazal, Warrap, and Unity, currently has a special administrative status in South Sudan and is governed by an Abyei Area Administration. It was due to hold a referendum in 2012 on whether to join Sudan or remain part of the Republic of South Sudan, but in May the North Sudanese military seized Abyei, and it was not clear if the referendum would be held.
2. Kafia Kingi, the westernmost part of South Sudan, which according to the Comprehensive Peace Agreement should have been given to South Sudan by Sudan. However, that did not happen, although South Sudanese troops were present there for several times. The area of Kafia Kingi, because it is disputed, so remote and far off, appears to be a safe haven for smugglers and criminals like the former head of the Lord Resistance Army, Joseph Kony. Most of Kafia Kingi is within Radom National Park, a Sudanese biosphere reserve, which is not far larger than Kafia Kingi itself.
3. Ilemi Triangle, a small region of South Sudan in the far southeast bordering Kenya and Ethiopia and formerly disputed between Sudan and Kenya. With the South Sudanese independence from Sudan, South Sudan also took over the dispute around the Ilemi triangle. The triangle is now almost entirely considered Kenyan by Kenya – and it is a de facto control area of Kenya. The position of the South Sudanese government on the triangle is not clear.

== Natural resources ==
South Sudan is mostly covered in tropical forest, swamps, and grassland. The White Nile passes through the country, passing by the capital city of Juba.

Half the water of the White Nile is lost in the swamps as vegetation absorbs it or animals drink it. The Sudd, the Bahr el Ghazal and the Sobat River swamps provide a significant resource for wild animals, as well as livestock.

=== Tree cover extent and loss ===
Global Forest Watch publishes annual estimates of tree cover loss and 2000 tree cover extent derived from time-series analysis of Landsat satellite imagery in the Global Forest Change dataset. In this framework, tree cover refers to vegetation taller than 5 m (including natural forests and tree plantations), and tree cover loss is defined as the complete removal of tree cover canopy for a given year, regardless of cause.

For South Sudan, country statistics report cumulative tree cover loss of 143,099 ha (1,430.99 km^{2}) from 2001 to 2024 (about 1.3% of its 2000 tree cover area). For tree cover density greater than 30%, country statistics report a 2000 tree cover extent of 11,386,557 ha (113,865.57 km^{2}). The charts and table below display this data. In simple terms, the annual loss number is the area where tree cover disappeared in that year, and the extent number shows what remains of the 2000 tree cover baseline after subtracting cumulative loss. Forest regrowth is not included in the dataset.

Annual tree cover loss in South Sudan, 2001–2024. View chart definition.
Tree cover extent in 2000 minus cumulative tree cover loss in South Sudan, 2001–2024 (loss-only residual; does not account for gain). View chart definition.

Annual tree cover extent and loss
Year	Tree cover extent (km2) (Note: This residual measure does not include forest regrowth.)	Annual tree cover loss (km2)
2001	113,816.51	49.06
2002	113,735.03	81.48
2003	113,714.39	20.64
2004	113,609.96	104.43
2005	113,504.30	105.66
2006	113,414.68	89.62
2007	113,319.45	95.23
2008	113,229.35	90.10
2009	113,148.78	80.57
2010	113,109.99	38.79
2011	113,019.87	90.12
2012	112,952.80	67.07
2013	112,903.49	49.31
2014	112,835.98	67.51
2015	112,811.38	24.60
2016	112,770.70	40.68
2017	112,702.13	68.57
2018	112,675.72	26.41
2019	112,638.18	37.54
2020	112,614.92	23.26
2021	112,586.79	28.13
2022	112,552.16	34.63
2023	112,490.34	61.82
2024	112,434.58	55.76

== See also ==
- Geography of South Sudan index
