= Koss River =

Coordinates: 5°13′0″N 32°31′0″E

Location
- Country: Uganda, South Sudan

Basin features
- Tributaries
  - left: Shilok River, Ingawi River

The Koss River is a river that flows in a north of northwest direction through the erstwhile Eastern Equatoria state of South Sudan, fed by streams from the Imatong Mountains to the west.

The Koss river rises near Ikotos. The head-waters of the river form a waterfall near Laborokala. This is the location of an annual Lango ceremony before the start of the rainy season where a goat is sacrificed and its stomach contents and later its bones are thrown into the stream. The Shilok river, a tributary of the Koss that separates the southeastern part of the Imatong mountains from the Teretenya ridge, joins the Koss not far from its source.

The Koss river divides the lowland area east of the Imatong Mountains from that west of the Lafit, Dongotona and Nangeya Mountains. Streams from these mountains feed the river. The river flows through the Bari country to the east of Torit. Near to Tirangore the river is spanned by a bailey bridge on the Torit-Kapoeta road, built by the Norwegian Church Aid. In 1881, Emin Pasha made a trip from Gondokoro on the Nile to "Tarangole", and from there travelled south along the Koss Valley, and then southwest to the Nile. North of Tirangore, the river passes Lafon and then flows almost due north before being lost in marshland.
