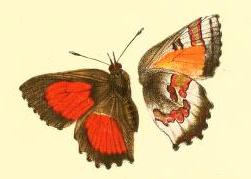

Scientific classification
- Kingdom: Animalia
- Phylum: Arthropoda
- Class: Insecta
- Order: Lepidoptera
- Family: Lycaenidae
- Genus: Capys
- Species: C. alpheus

Binomial name
- Capys alpheus (Cramer, [1777])

Synonyms
- Papilio alpheus Cramer, [1777]

= Capys alpheus =

Species of butterfly

Capys alpheus, the protea scarlet or orange-banded protea, is a butterfly of the family Lycaenidae. It is found in South Africa.

The wingspan is 31–40 mm for males and 32–47 mm for females. Adults are on wing from August to November and from February to April in two main generations.

The larvae feed on the flower buds of various Protea species, including P. cynaroides, P. roupelliae, P. subvestita, P. repens and P. grandiceps.

== Subspecies ==
- Capys alpheus alpheus (South Africa, from the Cape Peninsula to the Kouebokkeveld Mountains and southern Namaqualand, the Western Cape and then to the Eastern Cape)
- Capys alpheus extentus Quickelberge, 1979 (South Africa, from the Eastern Cape along the mountains to the eastern part of the Free State and the KwaZulu-Natal Drakensberg, Eswatini, Mpumalanga and Limpopo)
