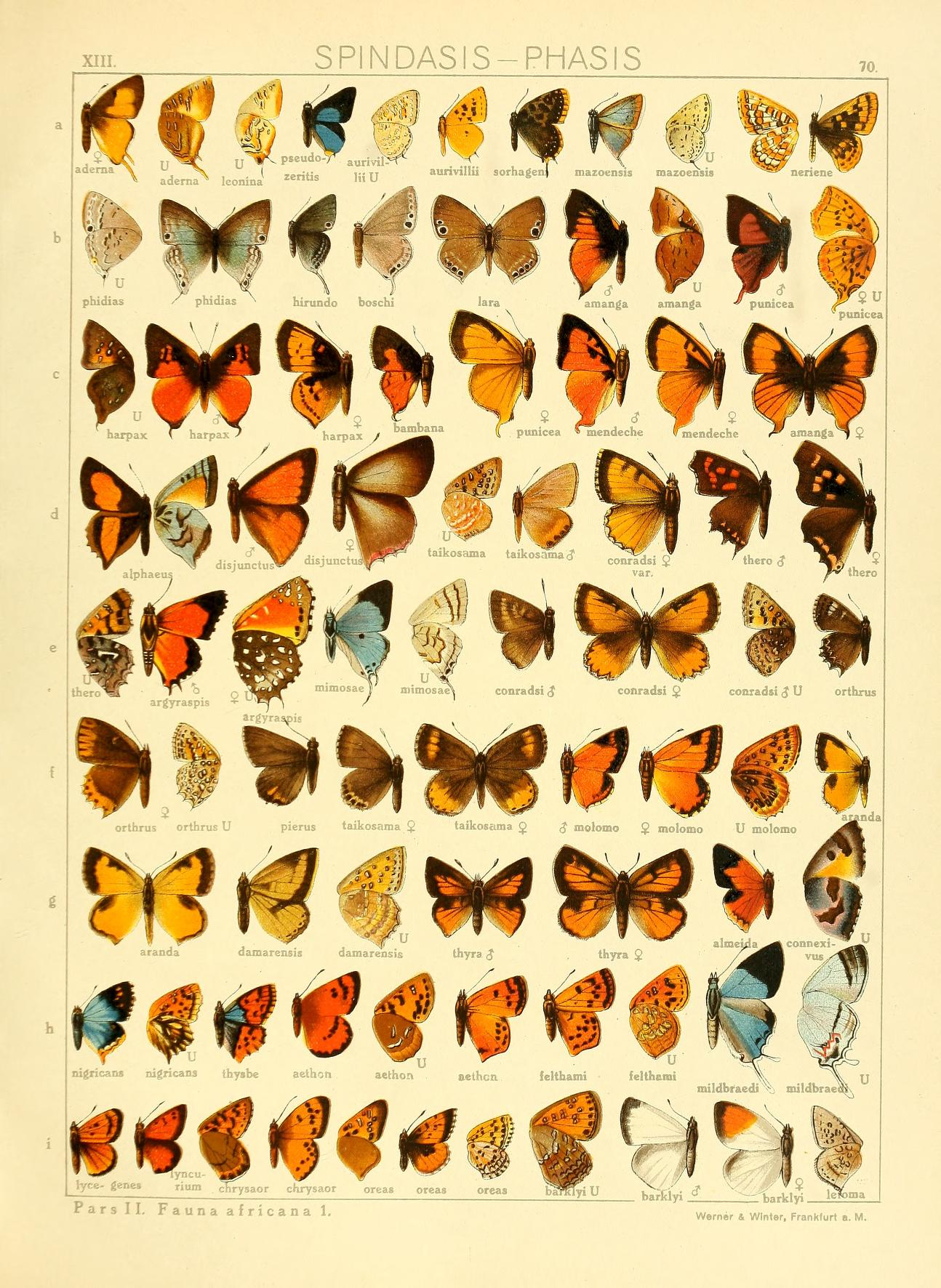

Scientific classification
- Kingdom: Animalia
- Phylum: Arthropoda
- Class: Insecta
- Order: Lepidoptera
- Family: Lycaenidae
- Genus: Capys
- Species: C. disjunctus

Binomial name
- Capys disjunctus Trimen, 1895

= Capys disjunctus =

Species of butterfly

Capys disjunctus, the russet protea, is a butterfly of the family Lycaenidae. It is found in from the Eastern Cape to KwaZulu-Natal, inland to Swaziland, Mpumalanga, Gauteng and Limpopo in South Africa. It is also found in Zimbabwe.

The wingspan is 31–37 mm for males and 31.5–38 mm for females. Adults are on wing from August to October and from January to March and sometimes April. There are two generations per year.

The larvae feed on the flower buds of the Protea species P. afra, P. welwitschii, P. angolensis, P. gazensis and P. petiolaris.
