= Capys bamptoni =

Scientific classification
- Kingdom: Animalia
- Phylum: Arthropoda
- Class: Insecta
- Order: Lepidoptera
- Family: Lycaenidae
- Genus: Capys
- Species: C. bamptoni

Binomial name
- Capys bamptoni Henning & Henning, 1988

Species of butterfly

Capys bamptoni is a butterfly in the family Lycaenidae. It is found in Sudan (the Imatong and Didinga mountains).
