= Capys catharus =

Scientific classification
- Kingdom: Animalia
- Phylum: Arthropoda
- Class: Insecta
- Order: Lepidoptera
- Family: Lycaenidae
- Genus: Capys
- Species: C. catharus

Binomial name
- Capys catharus Riley, 1932

Synonyms
- Capys catharus f. rileyi Stoneham, 1938

Species of butterfly

Capys catharus is a butterfly in the family Lycaenidae. It is found in Democratic Republic of the Congo, Uganda, Kenya, Tanzania, Malawi, Zambia and Burundi. The habitat consists of montane grassland.

The larvae feed on Protea species, including P. madiensis. They burrow into the young unopened buds of their host plant.

== Subspecies ==
- Capys catharus catharus (Burundi, Tanzania, Malawi, northern and eastern Zambia, Democratic Republic of the Congo: south to Lualaba and Tanganika)
- Capys catharus rileyi Stempffer, 1967 (eastern Uganda, western Kenya)
