= Capys meruensis =

Scientific classification
- Kingdom: Animalia
- Phylum: Arthropoda
- Class: Insecta
- Order: Lepidoptera
- Family: Lycaenidae
- Genus: Capys
- Species: C. meruensis

Binomial name
- Capys meruensis Henning & Henning, 1988

Species of butterfly

Capys meruensis, the Meru protea butterfly, is a butterfly in the family Lycaenidae. It is found on Mount Kenya in Kenya. The habitat consists of montane grassland at altitudes of about 2,300 meters.

The larvae feed on Protea gaguedi.
