= Capys cupreus =

Scientific classification
- Kingdom: Animalia
- Phylum: Arthropoda
- Class: Insecta
- Order: Lepidoptera
- Family: Lycaenidae
- Genus: Capys
- Species: C. cupreus

Binomial name
- Capys cupreus Henning & Henning, 1988

Species of butterfly

Capys cupreus, the cupreous protea butterfly, is a butterfly in the family Lycaenidae. It is found in Kenya. The habitat consists of montane grassland at altitudes between 2,000 and 2,200 meters.

The larvae feed on Protea gaguedi.
