= Capys juliae =

Scientific classification
- Kingdom: Animalia
- Phylum: Arthropoda
- Class: Insecta
- Order: Lepidoptera
- Family: Lycaenidae
- Genus: Capys
- Species: C. juliae

Binomial name
- Capys juliae Henning & Henning, 1988

Species of butterfly

Capys juliae, the Julia's protea copper, is a butterfly in the family Lycaenidae. It is found in north-western Kenya. The habitat consists of montane grassland at altitudes between 2,100 and 2,400 meters.

The larvae feed on Protea gaguedi.
