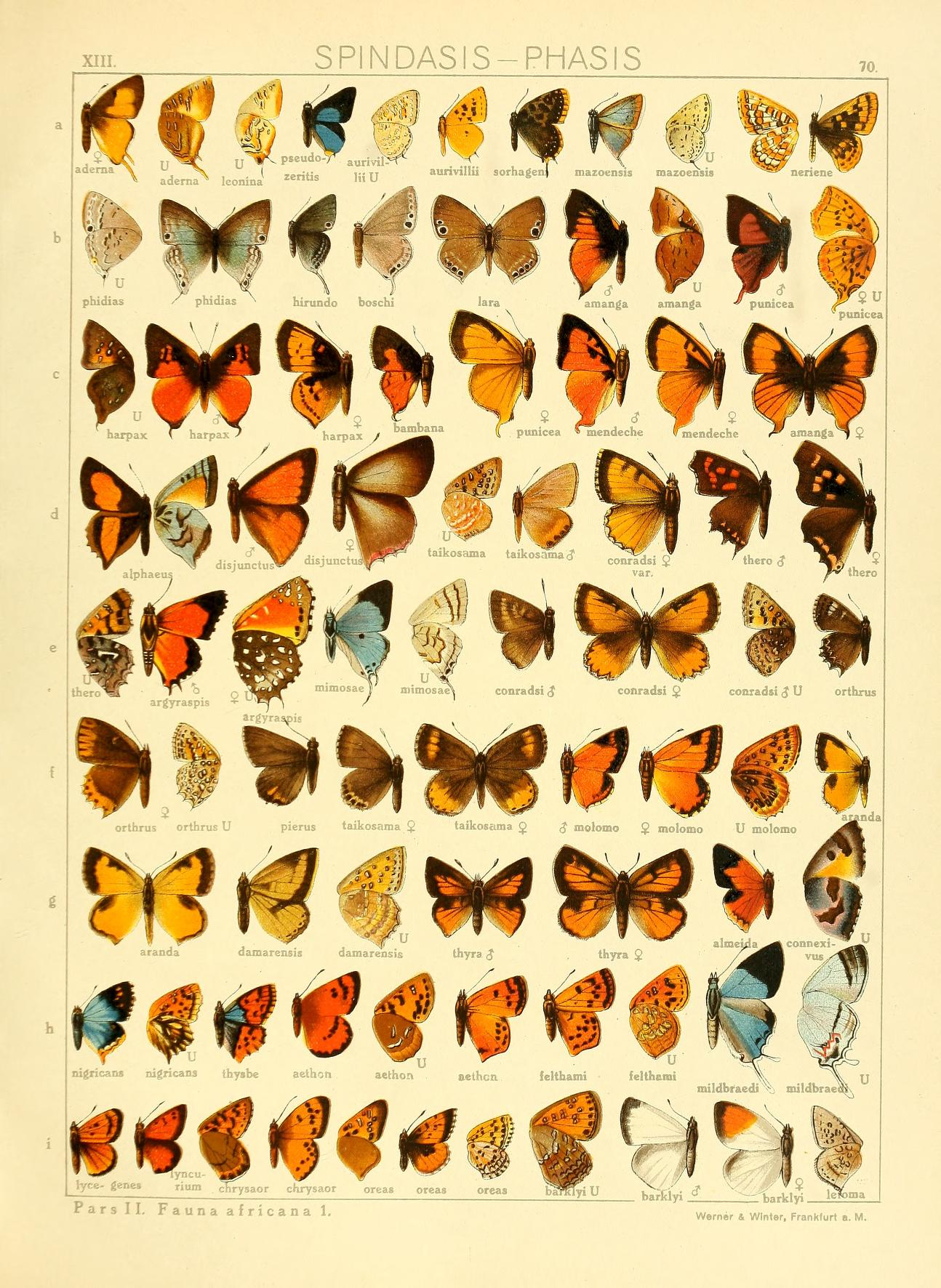

Scientific classification
- Kingdom: Animalia
- Phylum: Arthropoda
- Class: Insecta
- Order: Lepidoptera
- Family: Lycaenidae
- Genus: Capys
- Species: C. connexivus

Binomial name
- Capys connexivus Butler, 1897

= Capys connexivus =

African protea butterfly

Species of butterfly

Capys connexivus, the African protea butterfly, is a butterfly in the family Lycaenidae. It is found in Tanzania, Malawi, Zambia, Angola and Zimbabwe.

Adults are on wing year-round, with a peak from August to November.

The larvae feed on Protea gaguedi and Protea angolensis.

== Subspecies ==
- Capys connexivus connexivus (western Tanzania, Malawi, northern and central Zambia, Angola, western and northern Zimbabwe)
- Capys connexivus gardineri Henning & Henning, 1988 (Zambia: Mufulira area)
