= Capys stuarti =

Scientific classification
- Kingdom: Animalia
- Phylum: Arthropoda
- Class: Insecta
- Order: Lepidoptera
- Family: Lycaenidae
- Genus: Capys
- Species: C. stuarti

Binomial name
- Capys stuarti Collins & Larsen, 2000

Species of butterfly

Capys stuarti, the Kaduna protea playboy, is a butterfly in the family Lycaenidae. It is found in Nigeria. The habitat consists of lowland Guinea savanna.

Adults are on wing in February.

The larvae feed on Protea madiensis.
