= Capys collinsi =

Scientific classification
- Kingdom: Animalia
- Phylum: Arthropoda
- Class: Insecta
- Order: Lepidoptera
- Family: Lycaenidae
- Genus: Capys
- Species: C. collinsi

Binomial name
- Capys collinsi Henning & Henning, 1988

Species of butterfly

Capys collinsi, the Collins' protea butterfly, is a butterfly in the family Lycaenidae. It is found in central Kenya. The habitat consists of montane grassland.

The larvae feed on Protea gaguedi.
