= Bidens chippii =

Scientific classification
- Kingdom: Plantae
- Clade: Tracheophytes
- Clade: Angiosperms
- Clade: Eudicots
- Clade: Asterids
- Order: Asterales
- Family: Asteraceae
- Genus: Bidens
- Species: B. chippii

Binomial name
- Bidens chippii (M.B.Moss) Mesfin

Synonyms
- Coreopsis chippii M.B.Moss

Species of flowering plant

Bidens chippii is a species of flowering plant in the family Asteraceae. It belongs to the genus Bidens. The plant was at first named Coreopsis chippii after British botanist Thomas Ford Chipp (1886–1931)). Chipp found it on 11 February 1929 growing in scrub at an altitude of 3,125 metres (10,253 ft) on top of Mount Kinyeti in the Imatong Mountains of South Sudan.
