= Capys hermes =

Scientific classification
- Kingdom: Animalia
- Phylum: Arthropoda
- Class: Insecta
- Order: Lepidoptera
- Family: Lycaenidae
- Genus: Capys
- Species: C. hermes

Binomial name
- Capys hermes Henning & Henning, 1988

Species of butterfly

Capys hermes, the Hermes protea butterfly, is a butterfly in the family Lycaenidae. It is found in central Kenya. The habitat consists of montane grassland.

The larvae feed on Protea gaguedi.
