= Kinyeti River =

Coordinates: 4.76472°N 32.46667°E

- Location within South Sudan

Location
- Country: South Sudan

The Kinyeti River flows northward from the Imatong Mountains in the Imatong State of South Sudan, eventually dispersing into the Badigeru swamp.

== Location ==
The Imatongs reach out from their highest central block around Mount Kinyeti into a northwestern, western and southwestern chain. The western chain, with peaks rising up to 2,500 metres (8,200 ft) high, is usually known as the Acholi Mountains. The Kinyeti valley lies between the northwest and west ranges. The Kinyeti river, and others that drain the northern slopes of the mountains, feed the Badigeru swamps. These swamps, running in a SSW-NNE direction for 100 kilometres (62 mi), are discontinuous. They may be as wide as 25 kilometres (16 mi) in the rainy season, but average 5 kilometres (3.1 mi) in width. The swamps in turn may drain westward into the Bahr el Jebel section of the White Nile or eastward into the Veveno River.

== Colonial era ==
The British colonial administration began a forestry project in the Kinyeti basin in the 1940s, clearing the natural forest and planting fast-growing softwoods, Cyprus and Pine. In 1950 the mountains above 1,500 metres (4,900 ft) were made a forest reserve with no further settlement permitted, but the ban was not enforced during the civil wars. Forestry brought laborers into the mountains, and they started hillside farming in a wide area around the forest plantations. In 1949 fingerling trout supplied by the Kenya Game Department were put out in the upper Kinyeti River. By 1952 they had become established, and the forestry department was planning to stock other streams using trout from the Kinyeti.

== Later developments ==
Shortly before independence, the government announced that the Army's Equatoria Corps was to be transferred to the North, sparking a mutiny on 18 August 1955. 336 northerners died and 75 southerners, of whom 55 drowned in the Kinyeti after they fled in panic from Torit. Forestry was neglected during the First Sudanese Civil War (1955-1972). After 1972 an effort was made to rehabilitate the plantations, with a new road built from Torit, a hydro-electric scheme developed to power sawmills and other changes. As of 1984 only the steepest slopes had natural forest and there were plans to clear-cut most of the Kinyeti basin. A 1981 feasibility study assessed hydroelectric power potential in the Kinyeti River and the local power demand, but there was no follow-up. The most promising site seemed to be at Katire.
