= Capys bamendanus =

Scientific classification
- Kingdom: Animalia
- Phylum: Arthropoda
- Class: Insecta
- Order: Lepidoptera
- Family: Lycaenidae
- Genus: Capys
- Species: C. bamendanus

Binomial name
- Capys bamendanus Schultze, 1909

Synonyms
- Capys disjunctus bamendanus Schultze, 1909

Species of butterfly

Capys bamendanus, the Cameroon protea playboy, is a butterfly in the family Lycaenidae. It is found in central Cameroon.
