= David Chipp =

British journalist

David Allan Chipp (6 June 1927 – 10 September 2008) was a British journalist and author. He was a former editor-in-chief of Reuters and the Press Association, and a founding member of the Press Complaints Commission. Chipp was the first resident correspondent for the Reuters news service in China after the communist takeover in 1949, and was based in Beijing from 1956 to 1958.

== Early life ==
Chipp was born at Kew Gardens, where his father, Thomas Ford Chipp, was Assistant Director between 1922 and 1931. He attended Malvern College and whilst visiting an uncle in Malaya war was declared, so he carried on his education at Geelong Grammar School in Corio, Victoria, Australia. At age seventeen he returned to Great Britain and in 1944 enlisted in the Middlesex Regiment, serving in the regiment for three years. In 1947 Chipp was demobilised after attaining the rank of captain. He then went on to attend King's College, Cambridge, where he obtained a degree in history and was captain of college boats.

== Career ==
In 1947 Chipp joined Reuters as a temporary sports sub-editor. Later he was sent to Rangoon, Burma to open a new Reuters bureau there.
1956 saw Chipp sent to Peking where at the time he was the first non-communist reporter to be based there. He was later to write a memoir of his experiences in Peking entitled The Day I Stepped on Mao's Toes. The title refers to an incident when Chipp inadvertently backed on to Mao Zedong's feet at a reception.

In 1960 Chipp was recalled to London and by 1968 he had obtained the position of editor of Reuters. A year later Lord Barnetson asked Chipp to take the position of editor-in-chief of the then ailing Press Association. He succeeded in reversing the PA's decline, was noted for his resolute leadership during an industrial dispute in 1979, and remained as editor-in-chief until his retirement in 1986.

After retirement from the PA from Chipp took up a number of part-time positions including as an independent director of The Observer, a board member of TV-am and Teletext. He also worked for the Reuters Foundation and the Commonwealth Press Union. He would also write the occasional newspaper article and book review.

== Leisure pursuits ==
Chipp was interested in opera and rowing, he was a member of the Leander Club and a regular spectator and steward at Henley Royal Regatta.
He would also frequently attend 'Old Codgers' meetings of ex-editors at The Garrick, where he was a member. Chipp was also a beadle of St Bride's Church, Fleet Street.
