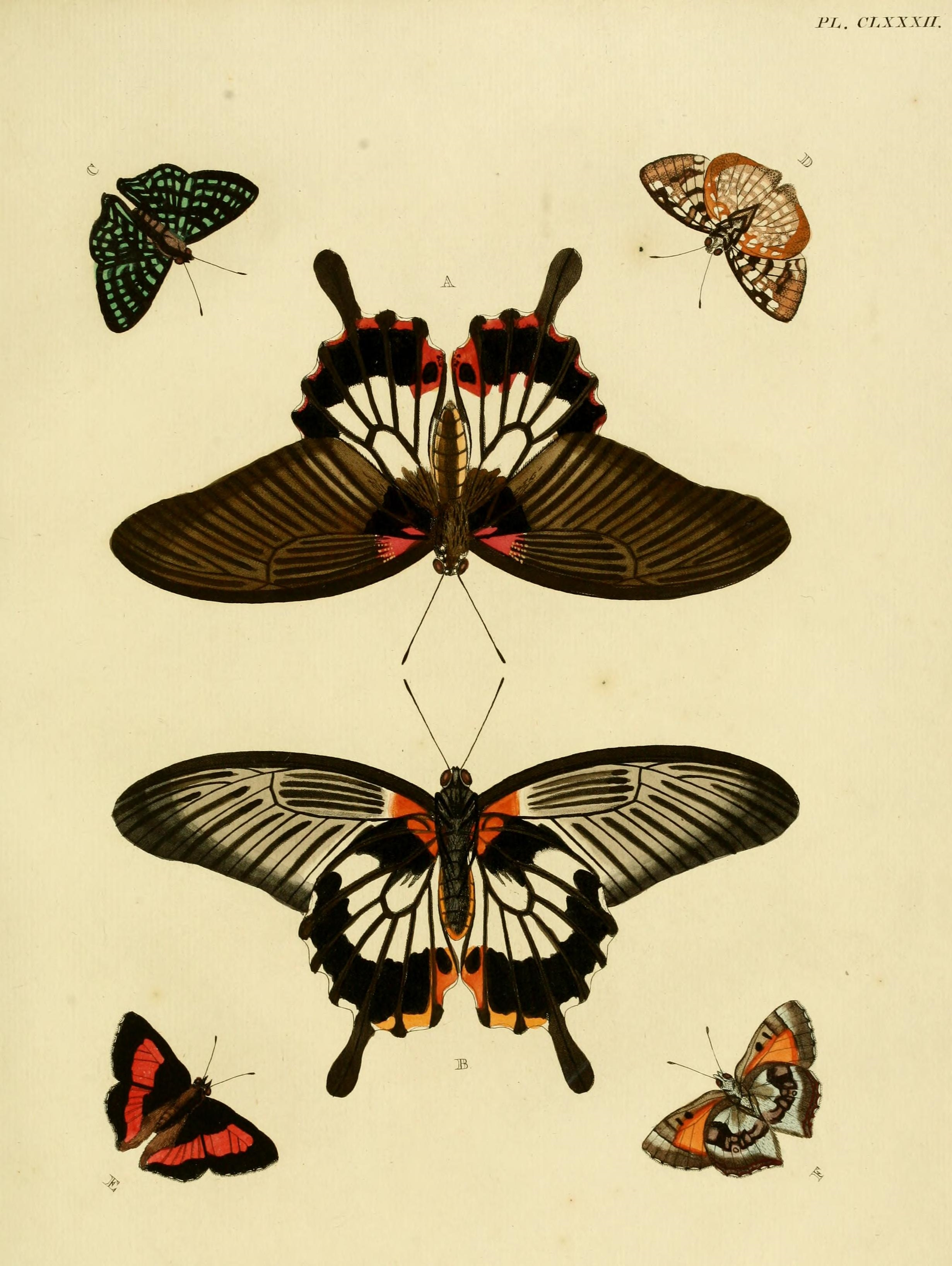
- Figures E and F, Papilio alphaeus, the type species of this genus, from Cramer and Stoll's De Uitlandsche Kapellen

Scientific classification
- Kingdom: Animalia
- Phylum: Arthropoda
- Clade: Pancrustacea
- Class: Insecta
- Order: Lepidoptera
- Family: Lycaenidae
- Tribe: Deudorigini
- Genus: Capys; Hewitson, [1865]

Type species
- Papilio alphaeus Cramer, 1777

Synonyms
- Scoptes Hübner, 1819

= Capys (butterfly) =

Butterfly genus in family Lycaenidae

Capys is a genus of butterflies in the family Lycaenidae. The species of this genus are found in the Afrotropical realm.

== Conservation of the name ==
In 1819, Jacob Hübner published the generic name Scoptes, including three species but without designating a type. The generic name was more or less forgotten afterwards. In 1966, Norman Denbigh Riley, for practical reasons, selected Papilio alphaeus Cramer, 1777, as the type species of Scoptes, by which Scoptes became an objective synonym of Capys, and started a case to suppress the name Scoptes for purposes of priority. In 1986, the International Commission on Zoological Nomenclature suppressed the name Scoptes (for the principle of priority not principle of homonymy) in order to conserve the name Capys Hewitson.

== Species ==
- Capys alpheus (Cramer, [1777])
- Capys bamendanus Schultze, 1909
- Capys bamptoni Henning & Henning, 1988
- Capys brunneus Aurivillius, 1916
- Capys calpurnia Henning & Henning, 1988
- Capys catharus Riley, 1932
- Capys collinsi Henning & Henning, 1988
- Capys connexivus Butler, 1897 (but see protonym connexiva)
- Capys cupreus Henning & Henning, 1988
- Capys disjunctus Trimen, 1895
- Capys hermes Henning & Henning, 1988
- Capys juliae Henning & Henning, 1988
- Capys meruensis Henning & Henning, 1988
- Capys penningtoni Riley, 1932
- Capys smithi Takano & Sáfián, 2024
- Capys stuarti Collins & Larsen, 2000
- Capys usambarae Congdon & Collins, 1998
- Capys vorgasi Larsen & Collins, 2003

The female of species Capys smithi is illustrated in A Sharp Eye on Butterflies of Ghana.
