= Capys vorgasi =

Scientific classification
- Kingdom: Animalia
- Phylum: Arthropoda
- Clade: Pancrustacea
- Class: Insecta
- Order: Lepidoptera
- Family: Lycaenidae
- Genus: Capys
- Species: C. vorgasi

Binomial name
- Capys vorgasi Larsen & Collins, 2003

Species of butterfly

Capys vorgasi, the Volta protea playboy, is a butterfly in the family Lycaenidae. It is found in the Volta Region of Ghana.

Torben Larsen developed a species numbering system for his 2005 publication Butterflies of West Africa. This species is #506. The 'Larsen' numbers have since been used with permission in A Sharp Eye on Butterflies of Ghana.
