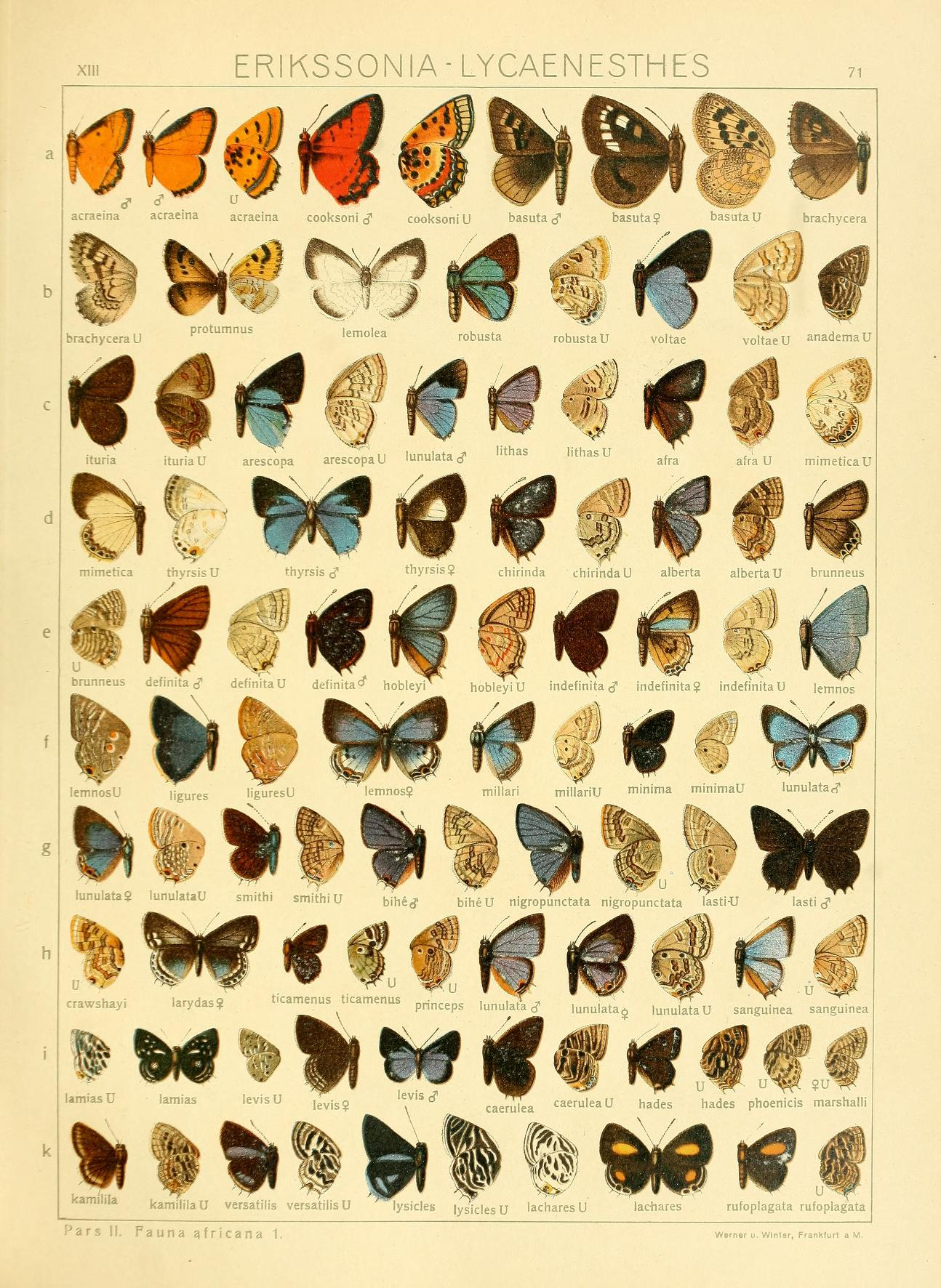

Scientific classification
- Kingdom: Animalia
- Phylum: Arthropoda
- Class: Insecta
- Order: Lepidoptera
- Family: Lycaenidae
- Genus: Capys
- Species: C. brunneus

Binomial name
- Capys brunneus Aurivillius, 1916

= Capys brunneus =

Species of butterfly

Capys brunneus is a butterfly in the family Lycaenidae. It is found in Tanzania, Malawi and Zambia.

== Subspecies ==
- Capys brunneus brunneus (southern and western Tanzania, Malawi)
- Capys brunneus heathi Henning & Henning, 1988 (Zambia)
