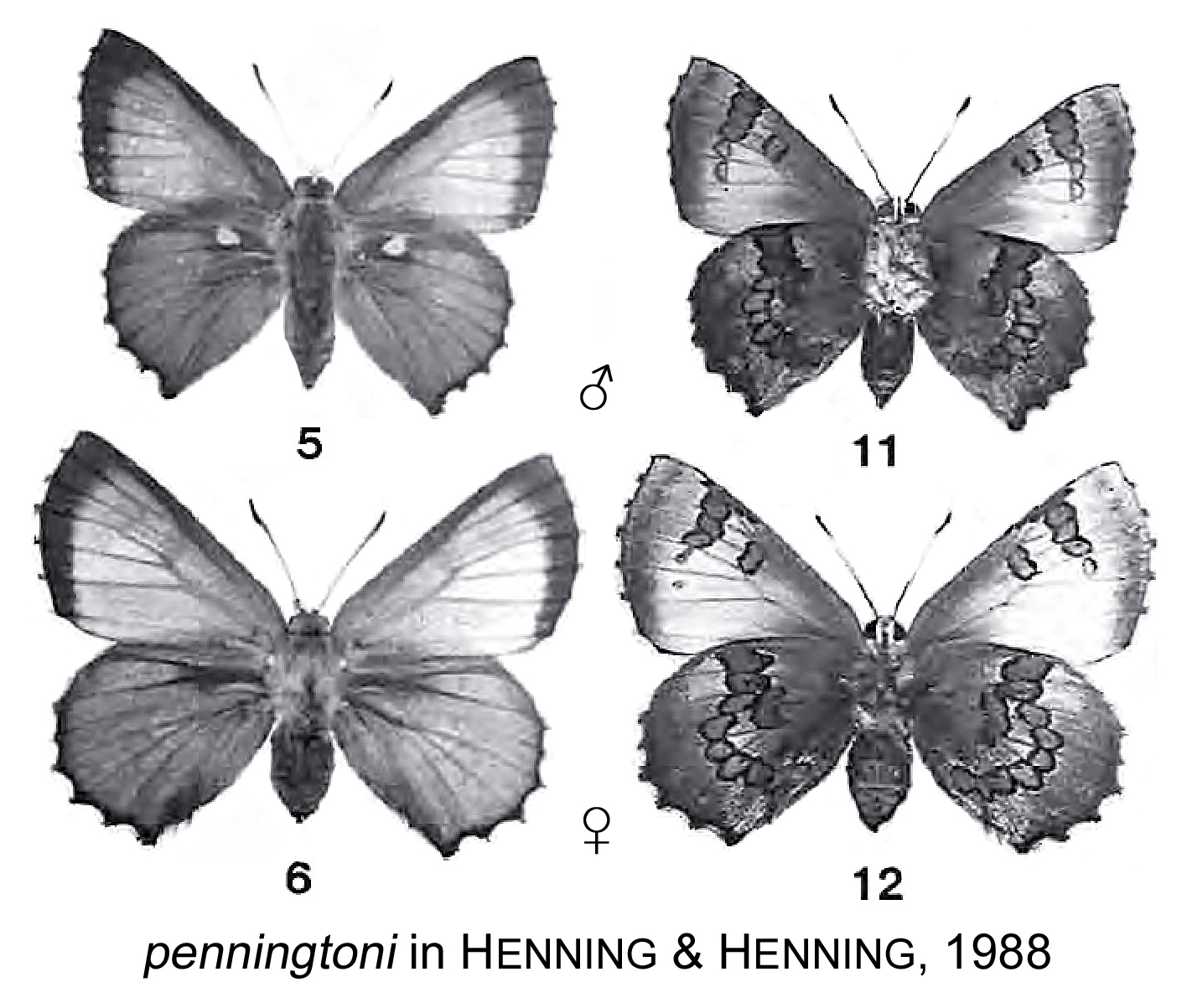

Conservation status
- Critically Endangered (IUCN 3.1)

Scientific classification
- Kingdom: Animalia
- Phylum: Arthropoda
- Class: Insecta
- Order: Lepidoptera
- Family: Lycaenidae
- Genus: Capys
- Species: C. penningtoni

Binomial name
- Capys penningtoni Riley, 1932

= Capys penningtoni =

Species of butterfly

Capys penningtoni, the Pennington's protea, is a species of butterfly in the family Lycaenidae. It is endemic to South Africa, where it is restricted to the KwaZulu-Natal Drakensberg foothills.

The wingspan is 32–40 mm for males and 34–47 mm for females. Adults are on wing from mid-September to early November. There is one generation per year.

The larvae feed on the flower buds of Protea afra and Protea simplex.
