= Badigeru Swamp =

Coordinates: 5.33333°N 32.0333°E

The Badigeru swamp (or Bedigeru, Badingilu) swamp lies in South Sudan, in the Central Equatoria and Eastern Equatoria states between Terekeka and Lafon.

Badigeru is a valley swamp with papyrus along the river and typical grasses for the region in the floodplain. Although not protected, it is relatively undisturbed by human activity. The swamps are fed by the Kinyeti River and others that drain the northern slopes of the Imatong Mountains. These swamps, running in a SSW-NNE direction for 100 kilometres (62 mi), are discontinuous. They may be as wide as 25 kilometres (16 mi) in the rainy season, but average 5 kilometres (3.1 mi) in width. The swamps in turn may drain westward into the Bahr el Jebel section of the White Nile or eastward into the Veveno River.

Lt. Colonel P. Molloy visited the swamp in the dry season between 23 and 25 February 1950, possibly the first European to reach the area. Starting from Mongalla, he traveled eastward across dry, open grassland for between 20 miles (32 km) and 25 miles (40 km) to a pool on the Khor Son, the name given to the Kinyeti River near the swamp. According to the local people, the Badigeru was the only reliable source of water between Mongalla and Lafon. Molloy's observations of wildlife tended to confirm that the water, which he found drinkable, remained year round. When Molloy visited, the Khor Son was between 150 and 200 yards wide, winding across a flat plain between a series of shallow depressions. In the winter, the 10 miles (16 km) wide plain would be flooded to form the swamp.

Molloy described rich wildlife in and around the swamp. He observed large numbers of pelicans, open-billed storks, wood ibis, sacred ibis, marabout, saddleback and hammerheaded storks, fishing eagles, lily-trotters, grey herons, spurwing geese, comb duck, whistling teal and common teal. In the burnt grassland around the swamp he saw zebra, hartebeest, tiang, reedbuck and Mongalla Gazelle. He also saw giraffe, ostrich, elephant and lion.
