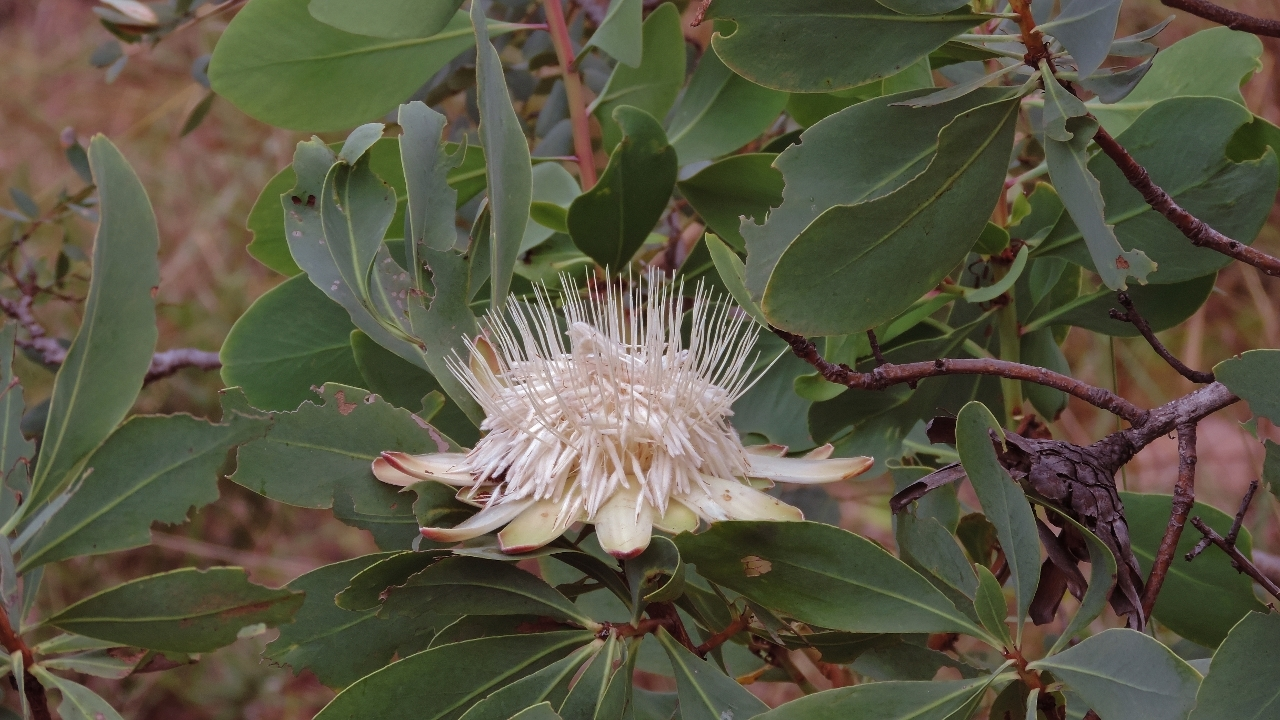

Scientific classification
- Kingdom: Plantae
- Clade: Tracheophytes
- Clade: Angiosperms
- Clade: Eudicots
- Order: Proteales
- Family: Proteaceae
- Genus: Protea
- Species: P. angolensis

Binomial name
- Protea angolensis Welw.

Synonyms
- Protea chionantha Engl. & Gilg; Protea urundinensis Hauman; Protea wangenheimii Engl.

= Protea angolensis =

Species of flowering plant

Protea angolensis is also known as the Angolan protea, northern protea or northern sugarbush. In Afrikaans it is known as the noordelijke suikerbos. This is a dwarf, multistemmed shrub or small straggling tree occurring in open wooded grassland and miombo.

== Description ==
The leaves are leathery and hairless, green to bluish-green, oval-shaped, and measure 16 cm × 8 cm (6.3 in × 3.1 in) in size. The inflorescences (flowerheads) are solitary and may grow to approximately 10 cm × 12 cm (3.9 in × 4.7 in) in size, sometimes smaller, 8–12 cm (3.1–4.7 in) in diameter. The involucral bracts a pale green to bright pink or red colour. The inner bracts may be either heavily or sparely covered in silvery silky hairs. This difference is often due to the age of the inflorescence, the hairs falling off as the structure becomes older. The fruit is a densely hairy nut.

GBIF recognizes three varieties:

- var. divaricata: A small tree to 4 m (13 ft) in height. Occurs in miombo. It flowers later than the nominate form, from April to July. The flowers and bracts are bright pink, dark pink to red.
- var. roseola
- var. trichanthera

== Distribution ==
This species occurs in northern, central and eastern Zimbabwe, throughout Zambia, western Angola, southern Democratic Republic of the Congo, Burundi, southern and western Tanzania, northern Malawi and to a limited extent in Mozambique (only in Tete). In Zambia it occurs throughout the country, and has been recorded in North-Western Province, Northern Province (Bangweulu Wetlands), Lusaka Province, Southern Province and Western Province.

== Ecology ==
The species is the host plant for the larvae of the butterflies Capys disjunctus and C. connexivus.
