= Capys usambarae =

Scientific classification
- Kingdom: Animalia
- Phylum: Arthropoda
- Class: Insecta
- Order: Lepidoptera
- Family: Lycaenidae
- Genus: Capys
- Species: C. usambarae

Binomial name
- Capys usambarae Congdon & Collins, 1998

Species of butterfly

Capys usambarae is a butterfly in the family Lycaenidae. It is found in Tanzania. The habitat consists of steep, rocky hillsides.

The larvae feed on Protea species.
