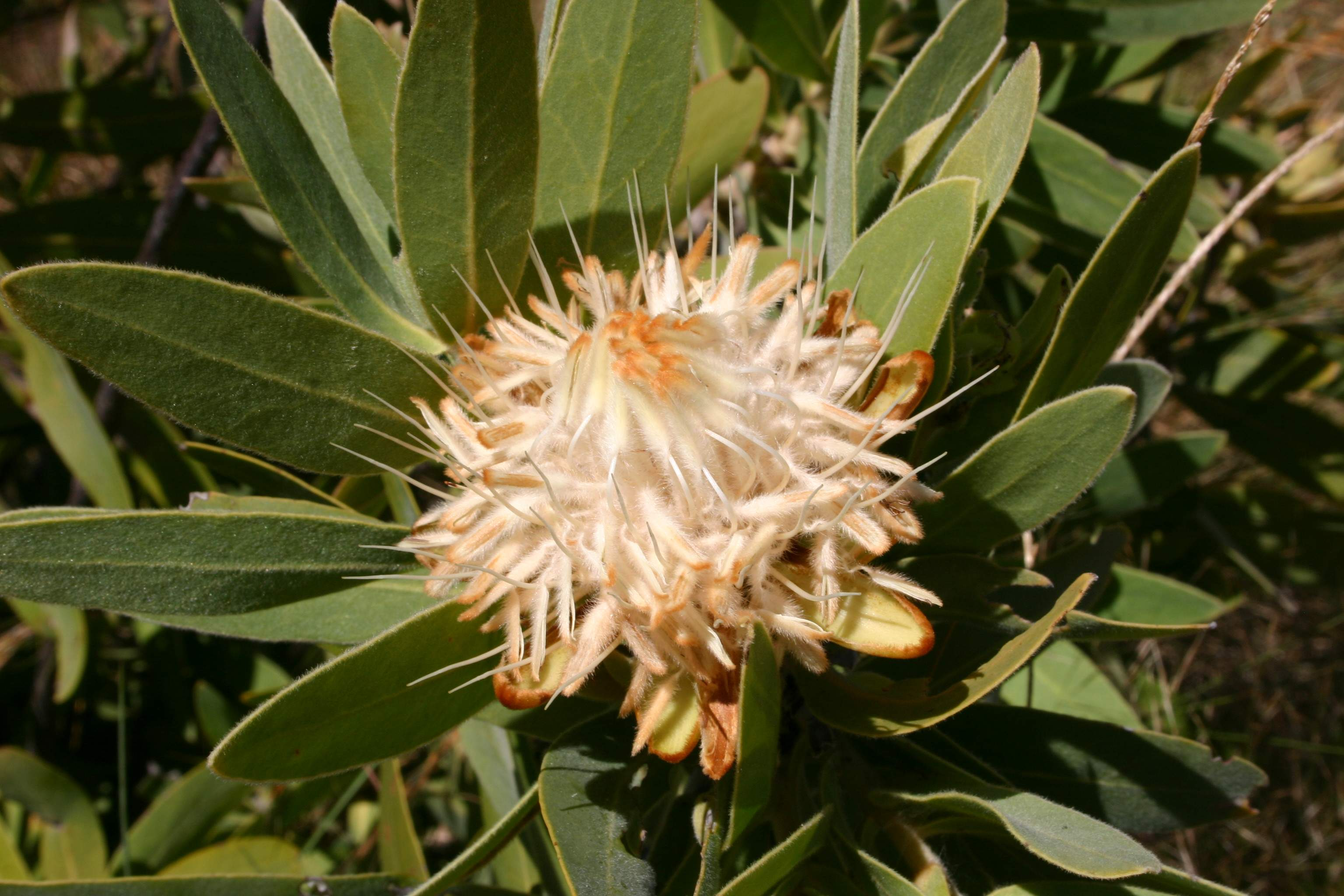

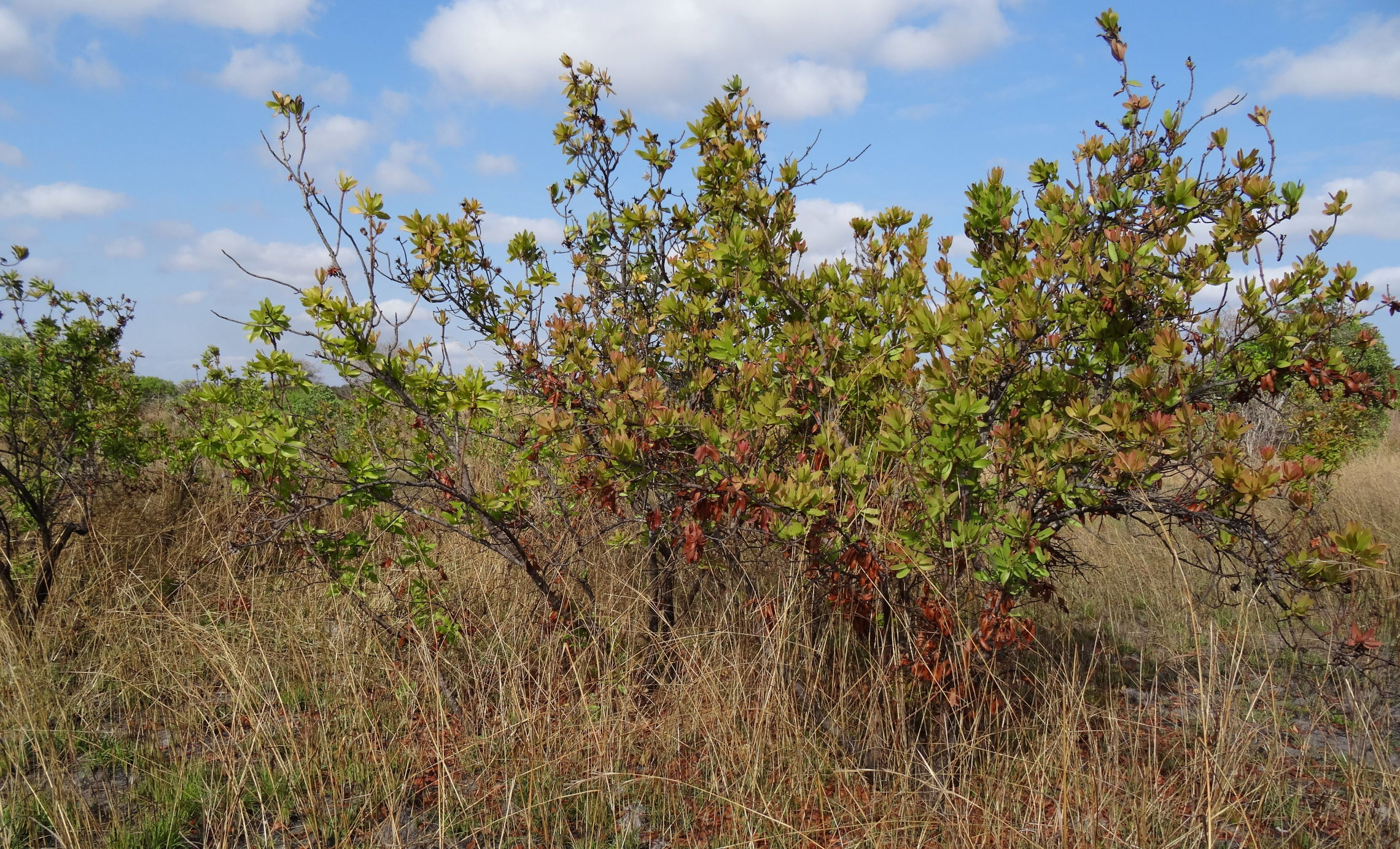
- Flower head and habit

Conservation status
- Least Concern (IUCN 3.1)

Scientific classification
- Kingdom: Plantae
- Clade: Embryophytes
- Clade: Tracheophytes
- Clade: Angiosperms
- Clade: Eudicots
- Order: Proteales
- Family: Proteaceae
- Genus: Protea
- Species: P. welwitschii

Binomial name
- Protea welwitschii Engl.

Synonyms
- Leucadendron welwitschii (Engl.) Hiern, 1900; Leucadendron leucoblepharis Hiern, 1900; Protea leucoblepharis (Hiern) Baker; Protea welwitschii subsp. glabrescens (Beard) Beard, 1963; Protea welwitschii var. glabrescens (Beard) Beard; Scolymocephalus hirtus Kuntze; Protea hirta Klotzsch ex. Krauss (later homonym, not of L. (1771)); Protea hirta subsp. glabrescens Beard; Protea welwitschii subsp. hirta Beard, 1963; Protea welwitschii subsp. mocoensis Beard, 1963; Protea abyssinica var. adolphi-fridericii Engl.; Protea abyssinica var. brevifolia Engl.; Protea welwitschii subsp. adolphi-friderici (Engl.) Beard, 1963; Protea congensis Engl., 1902; Protea eickii Engl., 1902; Protea goetzeana Engl., 1902; Protea welwitschii subsp. goetzeana (Engl.) Beard, 1963; Protea kirkii C.H.Wright, 1909; Protea melliodora Engl. & Gilg, 1903; Protea welwitschii var. melliodora (Engl. & Gilg) Beard; Protea welwitschii subsp. melliodora (Engl. & Gilg) Beard, 1963; Protea myrsinifolia Engl. & Gilg, 1903; Protea obtusifolia De Wild., 1921; Protea swynnertonii S.Moore, 1911; Protea uhehensis Engl., 1900

= Protea welwitschii =

Species of flowering plant

Protea welwitschii is a species of shrub or small tree which belongs to the genus Protea, and which occurs in bushveld and different types of grassland.

Vernacular names given for this species include cluster-head protea, honey-scented protea and rusty velvet protea in southern tropical Africa, and in South Africa the dwarf savanna sugarbush, cluster-head sugarbush or the white sugar-bush. In isiZulu it is known as isiqalaba. In Afrikaans the common names of troshofiesuikerbos, kleinsuikerbos, troshofie-suikerbos, welwitsch-se-suikerbos, witsuikerbos, witsuikerboskan, and simply suikerbos, have all been recorded for this species.

== Taxonomy ==
The first documented European to collect the Protea welwitschii was Friedrich Welwitsch in Angola, many years before it was first formally described as a new species according to the European botanical community, who had gathered a number of specimens in Huíla Province from late 1858 to early 1859.

P. welwitschii was validly described by Adolf Engler, using the herbarium specimens Welwitsch had collected on the Huíla Plateau to typify the new species, in an issue of the Abhandlungen der Königlichen Akademie der Wissenschaften zu Berlin. This issue is the volume for the year 1891, but it was actually published in 1892. Engler had already introduced the new taxon on June 11 of 1891 in a reading before the Koniglichen Akademie der Wissenschaften zu Berlin, titled Über die Hochgebirgsflora des tropischen Afrika, the same title as used in Abhandlungen, and, confusingly, he had already published the name, also in 1892, in a more general article summarising his work on African montane flora in the journal Botanisches Zentralblatt, also titled the same as the previously mentioned reading and the Abhandlungen article, but withholding a formal species description in this work.

=== Etymology ===
Clearly, the specific epithet commemorates the plants' discoverer, Friedrich Martin Welwitsch.

== Description ==
Protea welwitschii grows as a spreading, multi-stemmed shrub or small, gnarled, bushy tree. In tropical East Africa and Zambia it grows to 1–3 metres (3.3–9.8 ft), exceptionally 5 metres (16 ft), in height. On the Huíla Plateau in Angola in the 1850s Welwitsch measured it as growing to 12–20 feet (3.7–6.1 m). Plants growing in dambo in Zambia can have a strange suffrutex form, growing a number of erect, unbranched, annual or short-lived, 1 metre (3.3 ft) stems from ground level. In its shrub form it may have an underground bole or root-stock, from which the branches arise. The trunk grows to 30 centimetres (12 in) in diameter at the base. It is gnarled, and covered in an irregularly fissured, brown-black bark. The young stems are covered in a brown, tomentose fuzz.

The leaves are elliptic to oblanceolate in shape, bluish-green in colour, and up to 12 by 9.5 cm in size. Young leaves are densely covered with velvety white or brown hairs, usually becoming hairless when mature, except for at their base.

The flower heads are terminal at the end of branches, and usually grouped in clusters of two, or three or four, and are up to 6 cm in diameter. The bracts encircling the inflorescence are coloured white to pale cream according to one source, or pale yellowish to brown according to another, and are covered in silky hairs. The bracts can also be pink, although this is uncommon. The inner bracts are oblong in shape, and are 5 by 1.5 cm in size. The actual flowers are densely hairy. They are coloured creamy-white, and turn rusty brown with age. The plant is monoecious with both sexes in each flower.

The fruit is a densely hairy nut. The seeds are not stored for years in the inflorescences such as in some other Protea, but are released nine to twelve months after flowering, and are dispersed by means of the wind, after this simply lying on the ground until an opportune time for germination presents itself.

=== Infraspecific variation ===
It is a variable species regarding morphology. In 1963 John Stanley Beard recognised seven different subspecies, the nominate, four which had been formerly seen as independent species but which were now subsumed under P. welwitschii, and two new to science. These subspecies are not recognised by most workers. Young plants often have different characteristics than older, more mature plants, markedly in the pubescence on their leaves.

=== Similar species ===
It may be confused with the similar P. gaguedi. It can be distinguished by the larger, solitary inflorescences, and the completely glabrous mature leaves.

According to Hyde et al., P. welwitschii is easy to differentiate from the other Protea species in southern tropical Africa, by dint of its velvety-haired young leaves.

== Distribution ==
The species is widely distributed in the southeastern third of Africa south of the Sahara. It does not occur in the Sahel of West Africa. Countries it occurs in include Rwanda, Burundi, Uganda, Tanzania, the Democratic Republic of Congo, Zambia, Angola, Zimbabwe, Malawi, Mozambique, Lesotho and South Africa.

In Zambia it has been recorded in the provinces of Western, Copperbelt, Central, Luapula, Northern, Muchinga and Lusaka.

Welwitsch was only able to find the species on the Huíla Plateau during his eight years collecting botanical specimens in Angola.

In Mozambique it occurs in the provinces of Manica, Niassa, Sofala and Zambezia. On the slopes below Mount Dombe in the Chimanimani Mountains it can be common in the steep grasslands just above the miombo treeline.

In South Africa it occurs in the highlands across the east and northeast of the country, and can be found in Gauteng, KwaZulu-Natal, Limpopo, Mpumalanga and North West Province.

== Ecology ==
It occurs in various habitats, such as bushveld, thornveld, sourveld, wooded slopes, rocky hillsides, miombo and ericaceous fynbos. In East Africa it usually is found in montane grassland at 1,800 to 2,900 metres (5,900 to 9,500 ft) in altitude. In central and southeastern tropical Africa it may also occur in other grasslands such as low altitude dambos or other wet grassy places to 1,220 metres (4,000 ft) in altitude, as well as occasionally in wooded grassland, rocky grassland or normal grasslands at 1,500 to 2,400 metres (4,900 to 7,900 ft) in altitude. In South Africa it has been recorded as occurring at 300 to 2,000 metres (980 to 6,560 ft); while it primarily occurs in various types of mountainous bushveld and grassland, in some eastern areas it is found in grassland near the coast. It has been recorded at 1,390 to 1,500 metres (4,560 to 4,920 ft) in Mozambique.

It is often found in rocky places. It will grow on steep slopes. It has been found growing in quartzite sandstone-derived soils in Mozambique. In South Africa it has been recorded from soils derived from dolomite, sandstone, shale or andesite, as well as in sandy soils. In areas of Zambia it can tolerate levels of copper and nickel in the soil which are toxic to most trees or shrubs.

It blooms in the Summer to Autumn. In Southern Africa from December to May, with the peak in Zambia from February to March, and in South Africa mainly from January to February. It is pollinated by beetles and birds.

The adult plant is able to survive the periodic wildfires that burn through its habitat by re-sprouting from the underground bole.

== Conservation ==
This species was first added as P. welwitschii subsp. welwitschii to the Red data list of southern African plants as 'not threatened' by the South African National Biodiversity Institute (SANBI) in 1996, in 2009 this same taxon was assessed as 'least concern', and a large international team from across Africa under auspices of SANBI upheld this latter status for the entire species in the 2019 reassessment. According to the 2019 SANBI assessment the overall population numbers are stable.

The population of the species as a whole in KwaZulu-Natal was listed as 'lower risk - near threatened' in a 1999 publication.
