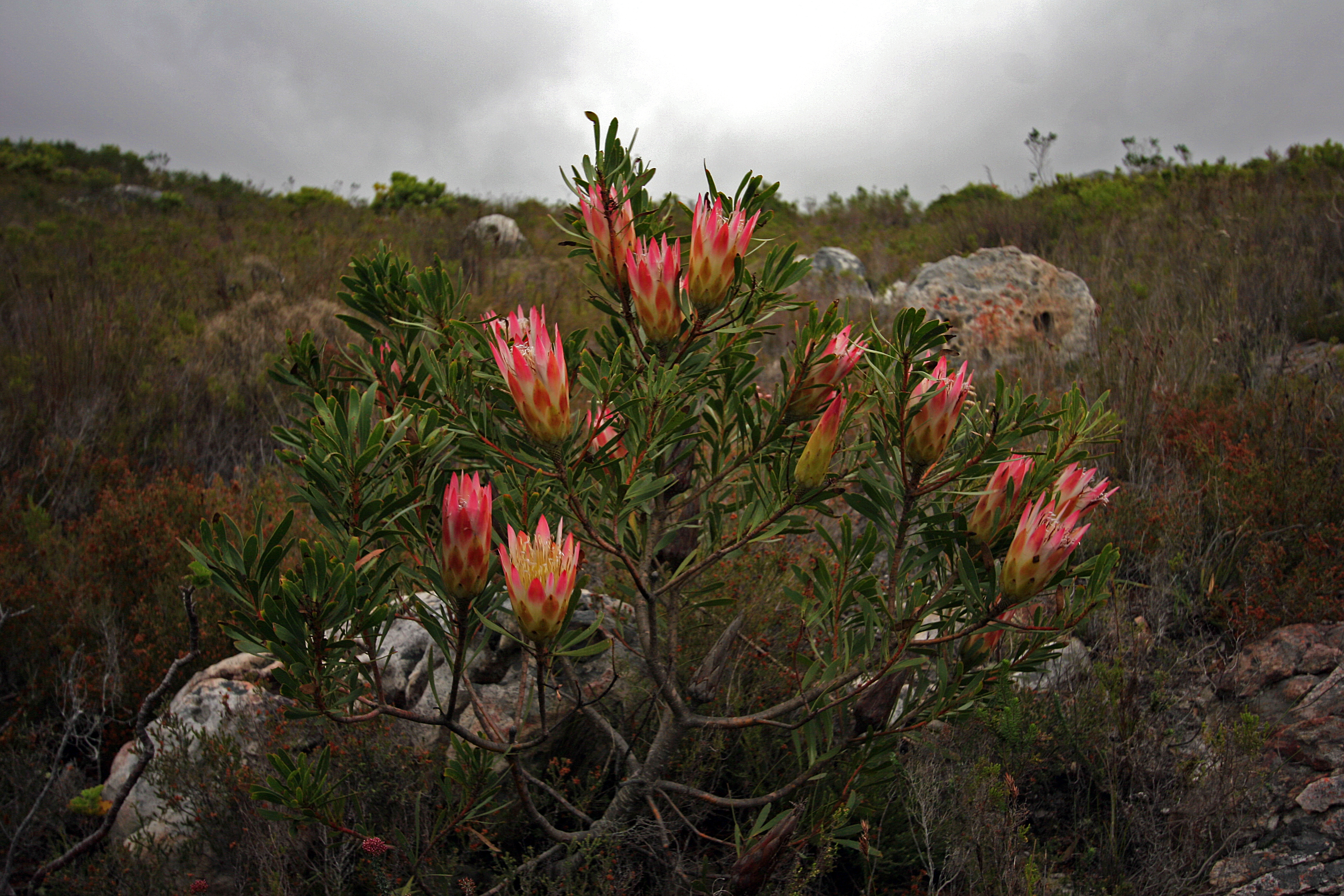
- Growing wild in fynbos habitat

Conservation status
- Least Concern (IUCN 3.1)

Scientific classification
- Kingdom: Plantae
- Clade: Embryophytes
- Clade: Tracheophytes
- Clade: Angiosperms
- Clade: Eudicots
- Order: Proteales
- Family: Proteaceae
- Genus: Protea
- Species: P. repens

Binomial name
- Protea repens (L.) L.

= Protea repens =

Species of flowering plant

Protea repens, known as the common sugarbush and in Afrikaans as the suikerbossie, is an erect shrub growing in the southern Cape Provinces of South Africa. This species is relatively adaptable and variable and can be found growing widely in various soils. Due to its showy flowers and adaptability, it is a popular subject for use in wildlife gardens in South Africa.

== Etymology ==
The name of the plant family Proteaceae as well as the genus Protea, both to which P. repens belongs to, derive from the name of the Greek god Proteus, a deity that was able to change between many forms. This is an appropriate image, seeing as both the family and the genus are known for their astonishing variety and diversity of flowers and leaves.

The specific epithet repens means 'creeping', a case of mistaken identity, where Linnaeus used two different illustrated plates to describe the species: one was of P. repens, and the other showed a dwarf creeping plant of a different species.

== Description ==
Protea repens is a dense shrub growing between 1 and 4 metres (3 ft 3 in and 13 ft 1 in) in height. The inflorescences, ranging in colour from deep red to a creamy white, are borne at the end of the branch, often nestled between two growing branchlets.

== Habitat ==
This species grows widely in fynbos on a variety of soils. Like many other Protea species, P. repens is adapted to an environment in which bushfires are essential for reproduction and regeneration. Most Protea species can be placed in one of two broad groups according to their response to fire: reseeders are killed by fire, but fire also triggers the release of their canopy seed bank, thus promoting recruitment of the next generation; resprouters survive fire, resprouting from a lignotuber or, more rarely, epicormic buds protected by thick bark. P. repens is a reseeder, where its life cycle depends on its seeds which may have been stored underground by ants or remained on the old flowerheads.

== Ecology ==
This species' large showy inflorescences are pollinated by both nectarivorous birds and insects, such as the Cape Honeybee.

== Cultivation and human uses ==
Due to the large amount of nectar it produces, people have historically boiled down this nectar to make a syrup called bossiestroop.

This species is hardy to zone (UK) 9 and is frost tender.
