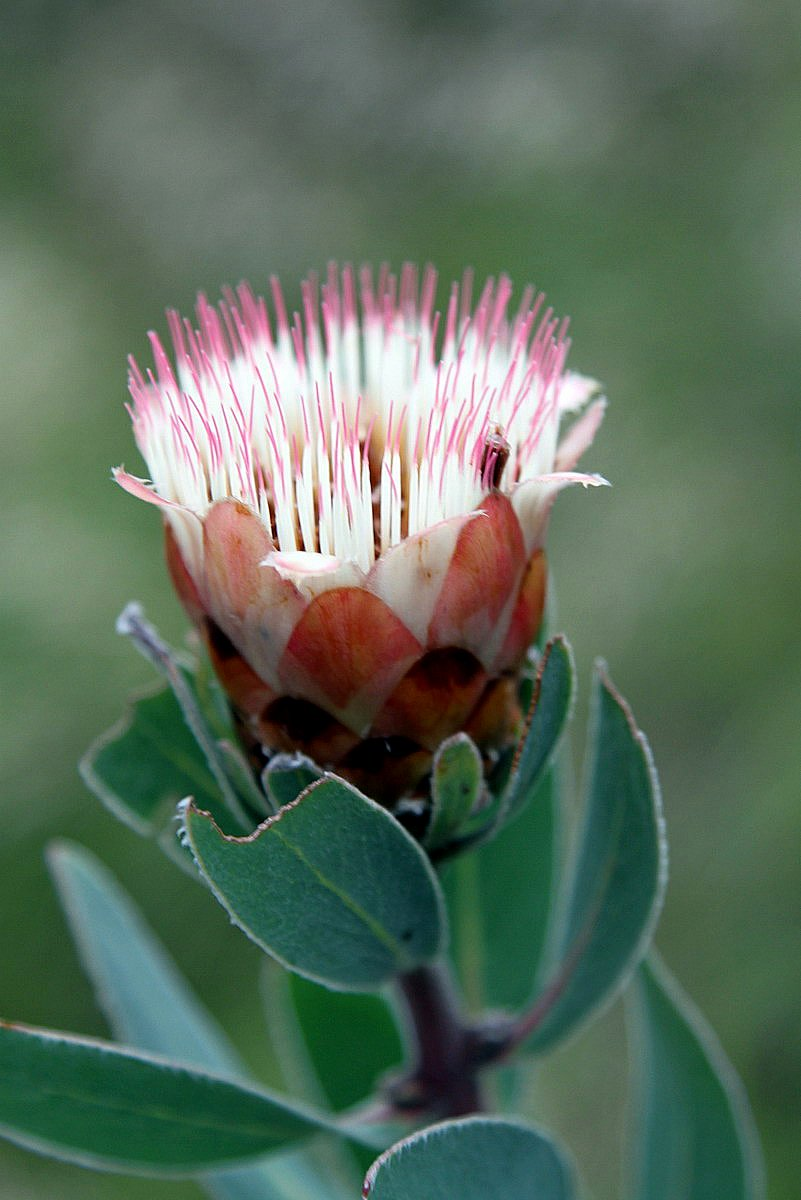

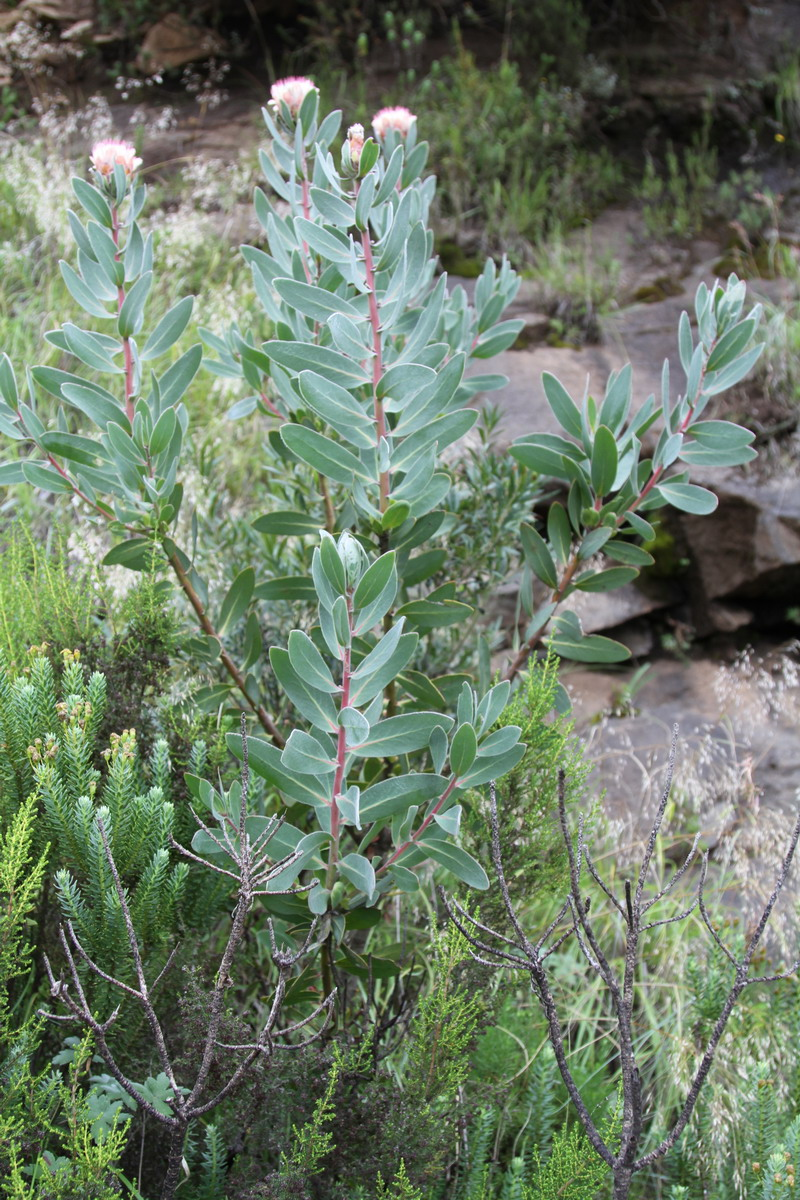

Conservation status
- Least Concern (IUCN 3.1).

Scientific classification
- Kingdom: Plantae
- Clade: Tracheophytes
- Clade: Angiosperms
- Clade: Eudicots
- Order: Proteales
- Family: Proteaceae
- Genus: Protea
- Species: P. subvestita

Binomial name
- Protea subvestita N.E.Br.

= Protea subvestita =

Species of flowering plant

Protea subvestita, the waterlily sugarbush, is a flower bearing shrub that belongs to the well-known genus Protea. The plant is native to Lesotho and South Africa and occurs in Mpumalanga on the escarpment of the Wakkerstroom, Free State, KwaZulu-Natal, Eastern Cape (as far as Somerset East), and the Klein Swartberg. The shrub is large, erect and grows up to 5 m. It flowers mainly from January to March.

The plant dies after a fire but the seeds survive. The seeds are stored in a shell and released after they are ripe and are dispersed by the wind. The plant is unisexual. Pollination takes place through the action of birds. The plant grows on mountainous acid veld and fynbos at altitudes of 1,200 - 2,300 m. In Afrikaans it is known as the lippeblomsuikerbos. The plant's national number is 98.

== Gallery ==
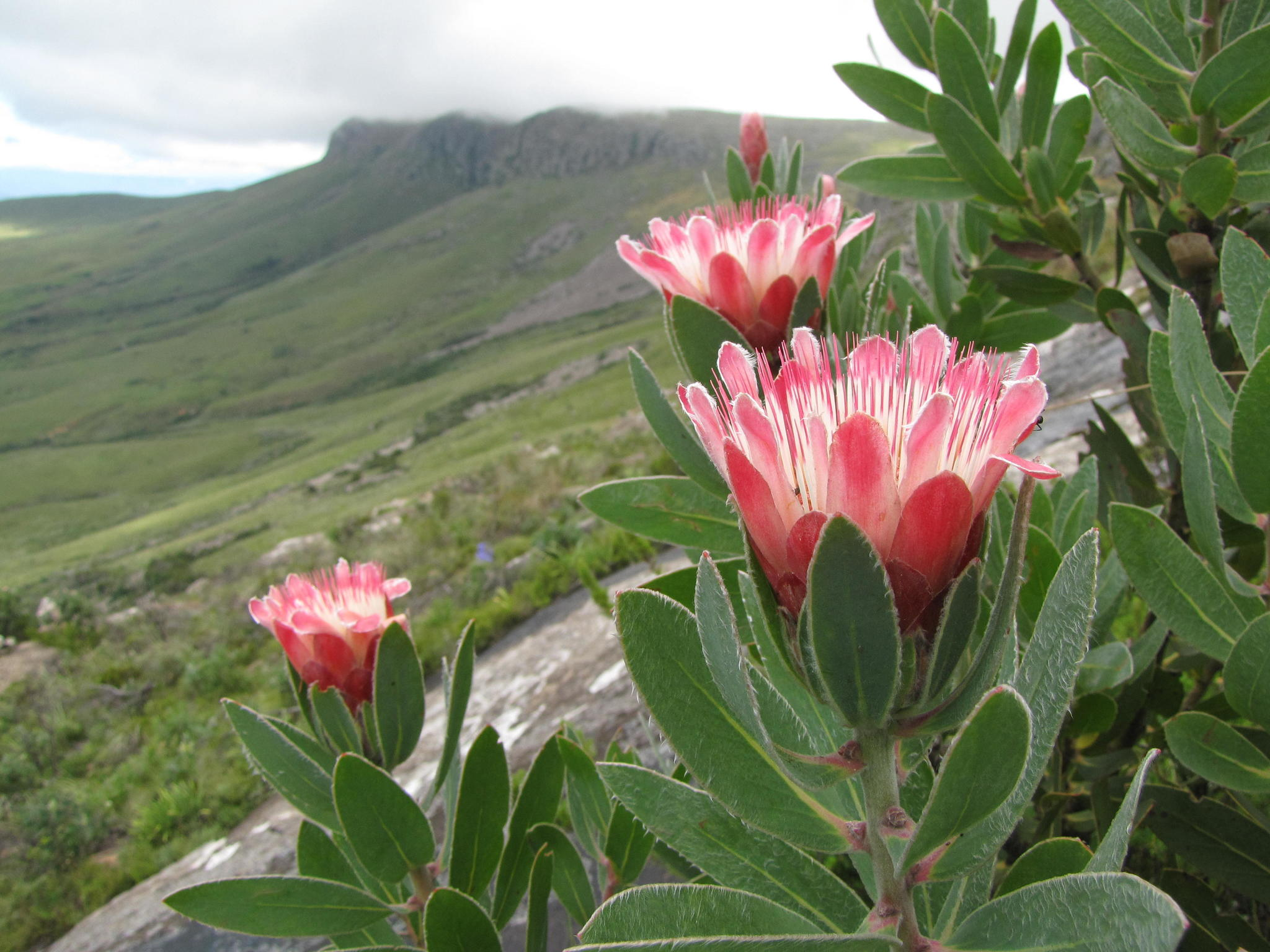

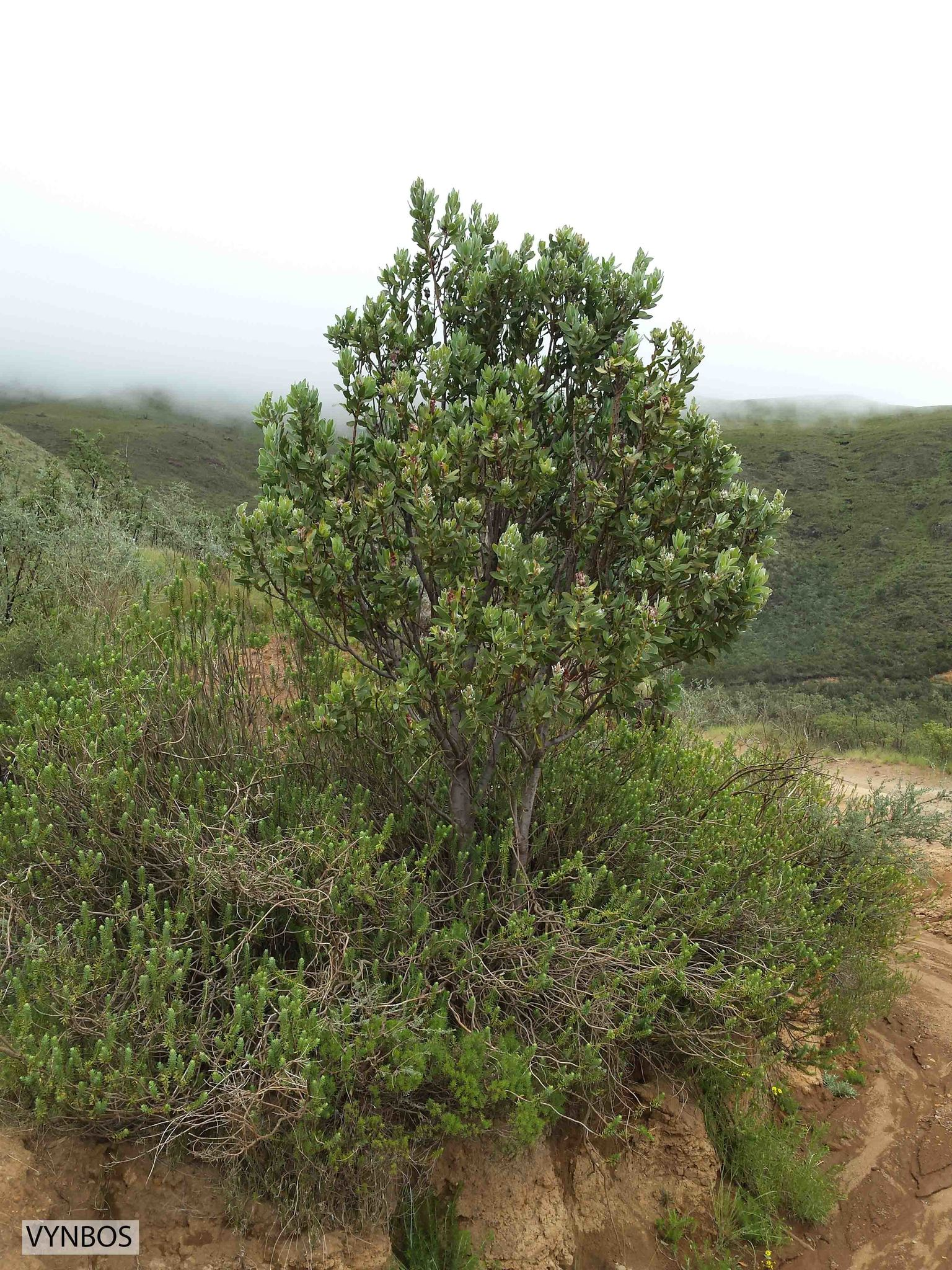

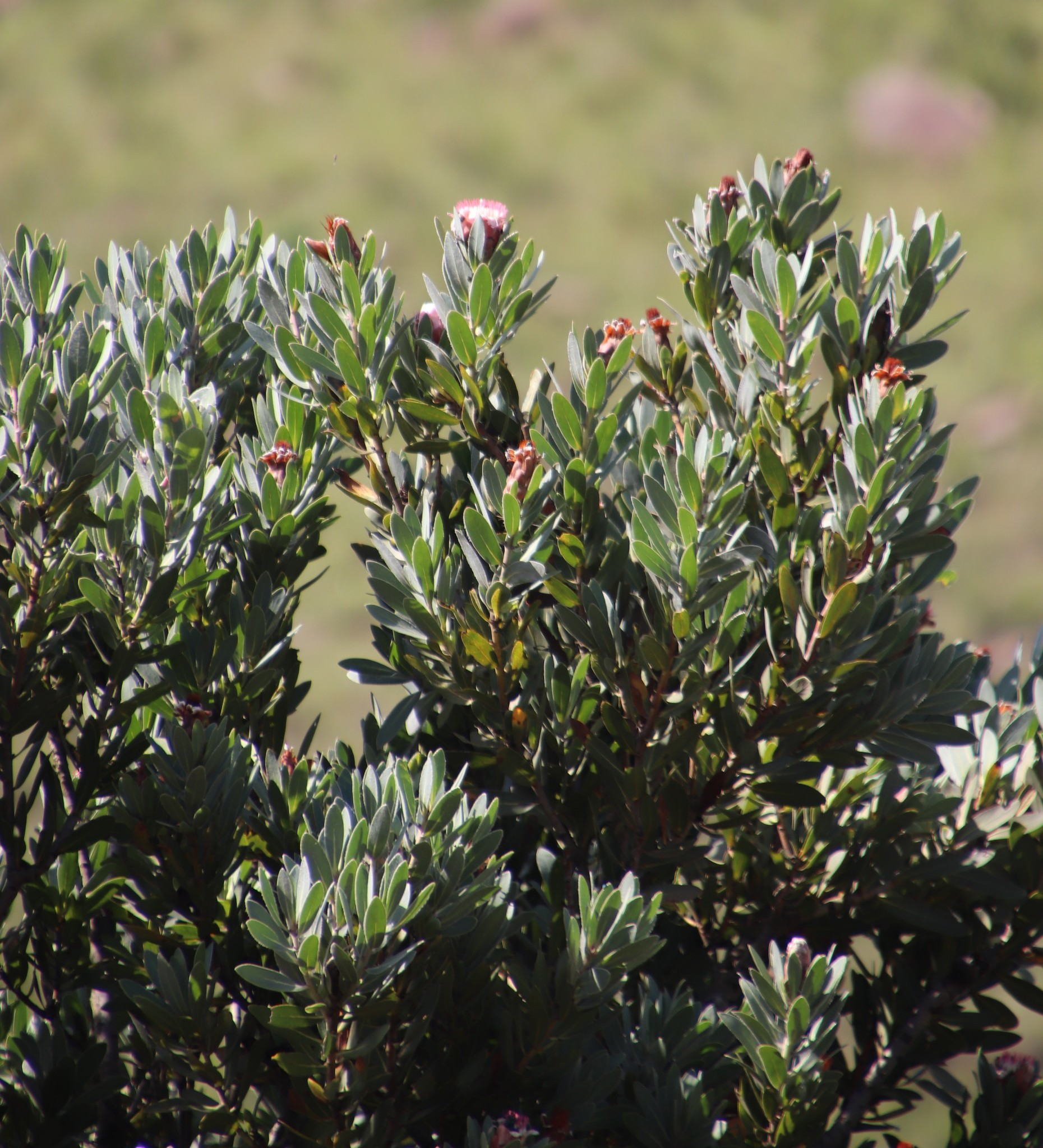
