= Tirangore =

Tirrangore
- Location in South Sudan
- Coordinates: 4°29′30″N 32°47′56.29″E
- Country: South Sudan
- Region: Equatoria
- State: Eastern Equatoria
- County: Torit County
  - Summer (DST): +3GMT

Tirangore (or Tirrangore, ) is a village in the Hiyala Payam of Torit County in the Eastern Equatoria State of South Sudan. It lies to the northeast of Torit.

The community lies on the hoss River. The local people catch fish, mainly for their own consumption. The village is part of the Hujang Kingdom of the Lotuho community, which also includes the villages of Haforyere, Oguruny, Olianga, Offi, Huma, Kekerek, Afayo and Omeni. In October 2010 King Fitali Abure Lomilu was crowned at Tirangore in succession to the late King Victor Akang Lomiluk, who had died in January of that year. The late king was exhumed for the ceremony.

The first European to visit the community was the explorer Samuel Baker who traveled there in 1863 from Gondokoro on the White Nile, crossing the Hinatye River en route. From "Tirrangore" he observed the peak of Jebel Lafeet in the Lafit mountains to the north, and unnamed mountains (Acholi range of the Imatong Mountains) to the south which he later crossed. In 1881 Emin Pasha also visited Tirrangore. The village was much larger in those days, as indicated by the large number of open spaces in the village today. Baker estimated there were 3,000 large houses when he visited.

The village lost many people during the Second Sudanese Civil War (1983–2005), and anti-personnel landmines from that war pose a continued risk. In July 2004 it was reported that the Lords Resistance Army (LRA) had displaced an unknown number of people in 18 inaccessible villages west and south of Torit. 10 people were killed and there was widespread looting and burning of villages. The Joint Relief and Rehabilitation Committee in Ikotos confirmed the presence in Tirrangore (New Kenya) of 700 people displaced from Moti, Ifwotu, Hilieu and other places.
