= Thomas Ford Chipp =

English botanist (1886–1931)

- Chipp around 1930, a year before his death
- Born: 1 January 1886; Gloucester, England
- Died: 28 June 1931 (aged 45); London, England
- Occupation: Botanist

Thomas Ford Chipp MC (1 January 1886 – 28 June 1931) was an English botanist who became Assistant Director of the Royal Botanic Gardens, Kew. He played an important role in development of the study of ecology in the British Empire.

== Early career ==
Chipp was born in 1886, son of a constable in Gloucester who died when Thomas was five years old. Chipp was accepted by the Royal Masonic School, and then became a student gardener at Kew. He was admitted to University College, London, earning a degree in botany in 1909. He then obtained a job as conservator of forests in the Gold Coast colony. His reports from this period show enthusiasm for developing the colonial economy combined with interest in the local environment and people. Detailed reports on local estates covered topography, climate, ecology, commercial value and suggestions for improvements. The reports were written for the use of local landowners and were not published in scientific journals.

A highly organized man, with great attention to detail, Chipp made extensive use of forms and questionnaires to gather and collate information from many sources on subjects that ranged from tree growth rates to illegal woodcutting. He later applied this technique to his ecological research. During World War I (1914–1919) Chipp was an officer in the British Expeditionary Force in France, rising to the rank of major and being awarded the Military Cross. After the war he returned to the Gold Coast and resumed his work on forest management. He published a dissertation on the ecology of the Gold Coast forests that gained him a doctoral degree from the University of London and was published as a book.

From Chipp's viewpoint, the natives were often an obstacle to efficient forest management. Describing the difficulty of establishing forest reserves in the Gold Coast, he said "every attempt to organise forestry on the same lines as obtain in other parts of the Empire where there are valuable and important forests, has been frustrated by the strong opposition of the natives, who understanding hardly, if at all, the peril of their country arising from the destruction of their forests, cannot bring themselves to surrender their individual rights for the protection of the forests". He was frustrated by the destructive habit of burning forest to clear it for agricultural use and deeply concerned by the ecological impact of the growing population.

== Later career ==
In 1922 Chipp returned to England to take up an appointment as assistant director of the Royal Botanical Gardens, Kew. In his talks to visitors to the gardens, his enthusiasm for ecological "improvements" through introduction of more useful species and techniques shone through. He believed without question in the value of changing land use to increase production and would have seen little value in conserving untouched reserves. He was known for his energy combined with careful attention to detail, for his care to ensure that the gardens were always well maintained, and for his interest in the welfare of Student Gardeners.

Chipp gained a central position among ecologists as secretary of the British Empire Vegetation Committee, the Imperial Botanical Conference and the fifth International Botanical Congress. He was one of the developers and promoters of a "systems" approach to ecological research. The 1926 Aims and methods in the study of vegetation which he and Arthur Tansley edited for the British Empire vegetation committee was extremely influential not just in defining ecological methods but in highlighting the need for a complete inventory of the empire's "vegetational assets". With this information, it would be possible to efficiently manage the vast natural resources of the empire.

In the late autumn of 1928 the Empire Marketing Board made a grant to Kew which enabled Chipp to pay an official visit overseas. Chipp visited the Sudan, then part of the British Empire, where he explored the Imatong Mountains. In February 1929 he climbed Mount Kinyeti, the highest mountain of the range at 3,187 metres (10,456 ft). Apart from a visit by R. Good to Gebel Marra which had obtained a few specimens, Chipp was the first European botanist to investigate the mountains of this region. Among other specimens, he collected Coreopsis chippii near the summit. On his return, Chipp was faced with a huge administrative workload connected with the gardens, the Botanical Congress and a directory of botanists worldwide that he was helping to prepare. He died prematurely of a heart attack at the end of June 1931, at the age of forty four.

In 1924 he had a daughter, Rosemary (18/09/1924 - 17/09/2020), for whom he named a Rhododendron, "Rosemary Chipp". In 1927 he had a son, David Chipp, who became a respected international journalist.

== Bibliography ==
- Thomas Ford Chipp (1914). A list of the herbaceous plants and undershrubs of the Gold Coast, Ashanti, and the Northern Territories. Printed by Waterlow and Sons. p. 55.
- Thomas Ford Chipp (1922). The forest officers' handbook of the Gold Coast, Ashanti and the Northern Territories. Crown Agents for the Colonies for the Government of the Gold Coast. p. 149.
- Arthur George Tansley (1926). Arthur George Tansley; Thomas Ford Chipp (eds.). Aims and methods in the study of vegetation. The British Empire vegetation committee. p. 383.
- Thomas Ford Chipp (1927). The Gold Coast forest: a study in synecology. The Clarendon Press. p. 94.
- Ludwig Diels; Elmer Drew Merrill; Thomas Ford Chipp (1931). International address book of botanists: being a directory of individuals and scientific institutions, universities, societies, etc., in all parts of the world interested in the study of botany ... Pub. for the Bentham trustees by Baillière, Tindall and Cox. p. 605.
