= Kinyeti =

Highest mountain in South Sudan

- Location within South Sudan

Highest point
- Elevation: 3,187 m (10,456 ft)
- Prominence: 2,119 m (6,952 ft)
- Listing: Country high point Ultra; Ribu
- Coordinates: 3°56′51″N 32°54′32″E

Geography
- Location: Ikotos County, Eastern Equatoria, South Sudan
- Parent range: Imatong Mountains

Mount Kinyeti is the highest peak in South Sudan. It is located in the Imatong Mountains in Ikotos County of Eastern Equatoria, near the Ugandan border. Kinyeti has an elevation of 3,187 metres (10,456 ft) above sea level. The group of high mountains that contain Kinyeti, extending to the border with Uganda, are sometimes called the Lomariti or Lolobai mountains.

The lower parts of the mountain were covered with lush forest. These are the most northern forests of the East African montane forest ecoregion. The summit is rocky, with montane grassland and scattered, low ericaceous scrubs, low subshrub and herbs in rock crevices. One of the first Europeans to visit the mountain was the botanist Thomas Ford Chipp, who discovered Coreopsis chippii near the summit.

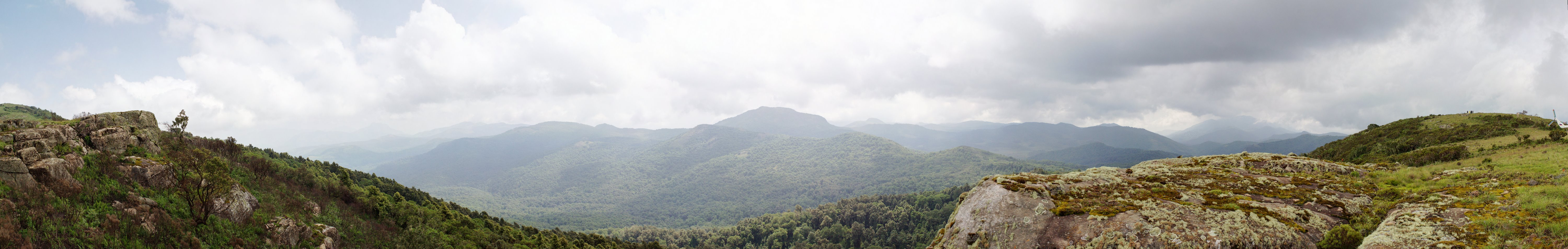
Panoramic image from the top of the mount

Named after Mount Kinyeti is the Mount Kineti chameleon (Trioceros kinetensis), a threatened species.
