= Lango people (South Sudan) =

Ethnic group

Lango is a Nilo-Hamite ethnic group originating in South Sudan. They are nomadic agriculturists and pastoralists. The Lango live in the Ikwoto County area of Eastern Equatoria State. This region borders Uganda to the South and their inhabitants share ancestral lines with the Lango of Uganda.

== Composition ==
The Lango are people who are predominantly found all over Ikwoto County of Eastern Equatoria State after the majority migrated to Uganda, Kenya, Tanzania and Congo. The name of the tribe is the oldest used by all Nilo-hamites. Lango are both the people and the Language, and it means advancers especially during the great migration era.

== Alternative spellings ==
The name "Lango" can also be spelled as Langgo or Lalangoni when referring to a male, or as Nalangoni for a female.
