= Ikotos =

Ikwoto
- Town
- Location in South Sudan
- Coordinates: 4°4′42″N 33°6′32″E
- Country: South Sudan
- Region: Equatoria
- State: Eastern Equatoria
- County: Ikwoto County

Population
  - Total: ~107,047
- Time zone: UTC+2 (CAT)

Ikwoto is a town in Eastern Equatoria of South Sudan, headquarters of Ikwoto County. The town is home to the Lango people, who have a total population of 107,047 people in Ikwoto county and elsewhere, and speak dialects of the Lango language.
