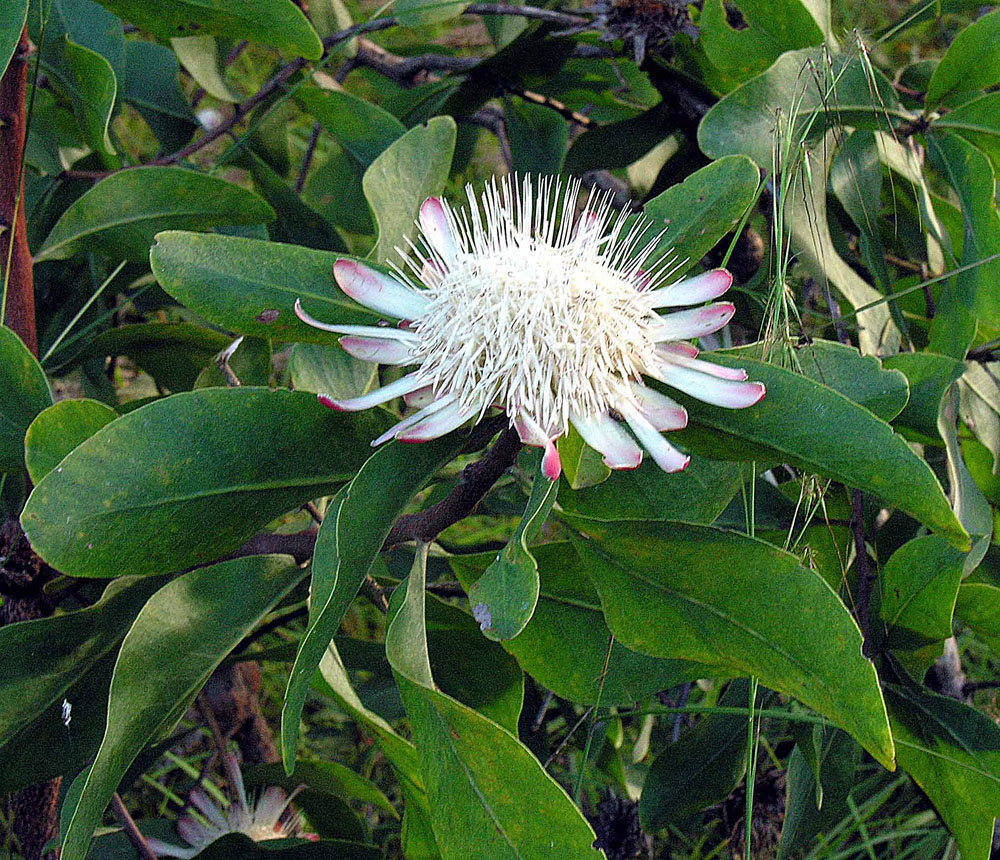

Conservation status
- Least Concern (IUCN 3.1)

Scientific classification
- Kingdom: Plantae
- Clade: Embryophytes
- Clade: Tracheophytes
- Clade: Angiosperms
- Clade: Eudicots
- Order: Proteales
- Family: Proteaceae
- Genus: Protea
- Species: P. gaguedi

Binomial name
- Protea gaguedi J.F.Gmel.

Synonyms
- Protea abyssinica Willd., nom. illeg.; Protea busseana Engl.; Protea chrysolepis Engl. & Gilg; Protea janssensii De Wild.; Protea manikensis De Wild.; Protea ramosa Hauman; Protea trigona E.Phillips

= Protea gaguedi =

Species of flowering plant

Protea gaguedi is a species of tree which belongs to the genus Protea.

== Common names and etymology ==
This tree is known by the common name of African protea.

Other vernacular names for this species used in South Africa include African sugarbush, African white sugarbush, deciduous sugarbush or white sugarbush. In isiZulu and Ndebele it is known as isiqalaba, in the Northern Sotho language it is called segwapi, and in Venda tshizungu. In Shona it may be called mubonda, mumhonda, or musitsuru. In Afrikaans this species is known by the vernacular names of Afrika-witsuikerbos, grootsuikerbos, groot-suikerbos, suikerbos or witsuikerbos. In Pokot the species is called Sikninwö for single tree and Sikïnin in plural.

== Taxonomy ==
P. gaguedi was first described as a new species by Johann Friedrich Gmelin in 1791.

== Description ==
This plant usually grows in the form of a small, erect to gnarled tree, reaching up to three metres in height.

It has leaves which are oblong to elliptic, and often distinctly sickle-shaped. The leaves are glabrous (hairless) when mature, except for a few hairs near the base of the blade. The leaves are coloured light green to blue-green. The prominent midrib of the leaves is coloured somewhat yellowish.

It usually has solitary flower heads, a specialised type of inflorescence. These flower heads are quite variable in form, but can grow up to 11 cm (4.3 in) in diameter. The flower heads are densely hairy and have a very strong scent. The outer involucral bracts range in colour from pink, to greenish-white, to white. The inner bracts are covered in silver hairs and are coloured pale green. The margins of the bracts may or may not have rusty-coloured hairs sprouting from them.

The fruit is a hairy nutlet.

=== Similar species ===
It is similar to P. welwitschii, but this species has 60 mm (2.4 in) diameter flower heads which are usually clustered together in groups of three or four, and young leaves densely covered in hairs, with older leaves retaining pubescence at their base.

== Distribution ==
It is widely distributed in Africa, from Eritrea in the north, to KwaZulu-Natal in South Africa. It does not occur in the Sahel of West Africa. Countries it occurs in include Sudan (including South Sudan), Eritrea, Ethiopia, Burundi, Rwanda, Uganda, Kenya, Tanzania, the Democratic Republic of Congo, Zambia, Angola, Botswana, Zimbabwe, Malawi, Mozambique, Namibia, eSwatini and South Africa.

In South Africa it is a widespread species across the north of the country, and can be found in Gauteng, KwaZulu-Natal, Limpopo, Mpumalanga and North West Province.

== Ecology ==
It found in a variety of habitats, although it is often grows on rocky ground.

== Conservation ==
Protea gaguedi is a widespread and common tree. However, recent climate change has increased the frequency of field fires, making the plant more rare, and this is worsened by the taking of the roots for traditional medicine.
