= Lokoya language =

Eastern Nilotic language of South Sudan

Lokoya
- Lokoya
- Native to: South Sudan
- Ethnicity: Nguleretanani, Oyira, Owe
- Native speakers: 85,000 (2017)
- Language family: Nilo-Saharan?: Eastern Sudanic?; Southern Eastern?; Nilotic; Eastern; Lotuko–Teso; Lotuko–Maa; Lotuko; Lotuko–Lokoya; Lokoya

Language codes
- ISO 639-3: lky
- Glottolog: loko1254

Lokoya is an Eastern Nilotic language spoken by an estimated 85,000 people in South Sudan. It is also referred to by various other names, including Okoya, Horiok, Ellyria, Koyo, Loirya, Ohoromok, Lokoiya, Lokoja, Loquia, Lowoi, Oirya, Owoi, and Oxoriok.

== Classification ==
Lokoya has been classified as a member of the Eastern Nilotic branch of Nilotic, in the Eastern Sudanic sub-grouping of Nilo-Saharan. Within Eastern Nilotic, Lokoya is considered part of the Lotuko language group, in the Lotuko-Maa branch of Teso-Lotuko-Maa (also referred to as the non-Bari languages). Other members of the Lotuko language group include Lotuko, Lopit, Dongotono and Lango, all spoken in nearby regions of in South Sudan. Of these languages, Lotuko is most similar to Lokoya, with a comparative study showing 64.5% lexical similarity between the two. The same study showed 57.4% lexical similarity between Lokoya and Lopit, and 56.5% similarity between Lokoya and Dongotono. In the early literature on Lokoya and related languages, there was a great deal of confusion over the name of the language and people, and whether different names referred to the same group or a different group. For example, Ohoriok was initially believed to be a distinct group to the Lokoya, but accounts elsewhere state that this was in fact a name that was used in earlier times, and the name Lokoya, derived from a nickname used by the Bari, displaced the name Ohoriok.

== Geographic distribution ==
The Lokoya language is spoken by the Lokoya people, who live in the hilly terrain and valleys east of Juba, South Sudan. The Lokoya areas involves many number of different villages; in the west, these include Ngulere, Liria, Langabu, Ngangala, and Ilyangari, and in the east, the Lokoya villages are Lobuhi, Pura, Losok, Lohira, Lohilo, Ohwa, Hojobi, Oyata. There are an estimated 12,400 speakers of the language, and the language is considered threatened. It is noted that there are no monolinguals, and that 10% of Lokoya speakers also speak Lotuko. However, the number of Lokoya people may be as many as 30,000.

== Phonology ==
There has been very little research on Lokoya, but some tentative phonological and morphological observations can be found in Vossen (1982), based on wordlist data collected in the 1970s. Vossen notes that the data are too limited to draw any safe conclusions. He observed that the phoneme inventories of Lokoya, Dongotono and Lopit were similar enough to be treated together, and provided a consonant inventory for all three languages together, represented in the table below.

=== Consonants ===
	Labial		Lab-dent	Dental		Alveolar		Palatal		Velar		Glottal
Nasal		m					n		ɲ		ŋ	
Stop	p	b		t̪	d̪	tː		c	ɟ	k	g	(ʔ)
Stop	(pː)											
Fricative	(ɸ)		(f)			s				(x)		
Lateral							l					
Rhotic							r					
Approximant		w									j	
Approximant		wː									jː	

The voiced palatal stop /ɟ/ is described as implosive (/ʄ/). Vossen also notes that /b/ is interchangeable with implosive [ɓ], and /d/ is interchangeable with implosive [ɗ]. In Lokoya, /p/ is replaced by [f] or [v] between vowels. Medial geminate /pː/ has been observed in a few instances but it is not clear if it is contrastive. /k/ is usually replaced by [ɣ] between vowels but may also be replaced by [x] or [h]. However, in certain environments /k/ is retained. The glottal stop /ʔ/ occurs word-finally only. The approximants /l/ and /r/ are not found word-initially in any of Vossen's Lokoya examples, and the glides /wː/ and /jː/ are only found word-medially.

=== Vowels ===
According to Vossen, Lokoya has two sets of five vowels, distinguished by the phonological feature Advanced Tongue Root ([ATR]). These are listed in the table below.

	Front		Back	
	[+ATR]	[-ATR]	[+ATR]	[-ATR]
Close	i	ɪ	u	ʊ
Close-mid	e		o	
Open-mid		ɛ		ɔ
Open			a	a

However, Vossen notes that no different symbols were used for [+ATR] /a/ and [-ATR] /a/ "as they cannot be distinguished phonetically".

Vossen finds no examples of vowel length being contrastive in Lokoya. He observes that vowel harmony plays an important role, but does not describe the process.

=== Tone ===
Vossen observes that on the surface there are four tones in Lokoya: High, Low, Mid, and High-Falling. They appear to be used for both lexical and grammatical contrasts.

== Grammar ==
Word order in Lokoya is generally Verb-Subject-Object, as is typical for most Eastern Nilotic languages.

Vossen states that for all the non-Bari languages, including Lokoya, the verbs fall into two morphological classes, conventionally called Class 1 and Class 2. In Lokoya, it appears that Class 2 verbs have a stem with an initial mid-front vowel /e-/ or /ɛ-/, and Class 1 verb stems have an initial low vowel /a-/. A number of possible verbal affixes were observed but their functions not determined.

Number-marking on nouns appears to be extremely irregular. A variety of suffixes are used to indicate singular, singulative, and plural.

Like other languages in the Lotuko group, Lokoya has two grammatical genders, masculine and feminine.

== Vocabulary ==
Some example Lokoya words are given below, from the wordlist in Vossen (1982). Each Lokoya word is in the phonetic transcription used by Vossen, as there is not yet an established orthography for the language.

English	Lokoya
sun	ɔɣɔ́lɔ̀ŋ
moon	ɔ̀jɛ́và
mountain	ɔ́ɗɔ́ŋɛ́
river	ɔwɔ́r
mouth	akʊ́tʊ́k
hand	aɣɛ́náŋ
tree	ójándɪ́k
grass	ɔmjáŋ
water	aɣare
fire	akɪ́màŋ
animal	ɪ́càŋ
bird	aɣweɲí
snake	amúnú
village	amijhi
