= Logir people =

Ethnic group in South Sudan

Logir
Regions with significant populations
- Eastern Equatoria

Languages
- Logir dialect

Religion
- predominantly Christianity minority traditional African religions

Related ethnic groups
- Otuho; Dongotono; Imatong; Lokoya

The Logir are a Nilotic ethnic group numbering a few thousand people living in Eastern Equatoria state, South Sudan. They speak a dialect of the Otuho language and their language is the most grammatical and richest language in terms of words among any other Otuho speakers.

The Logir are part of the Eastern Nilotes who were originally staying in the present-day land of Ethiopia, precisely in an area on top of Lake Turkana. They then moved to South Sudan after being displaced by the Oromia of Ethiopia. They came to stay at their present place north of Uganda, where they encountered the Madi people.
