= Lopit language =

Eastern Nilotic language

Lopit
- Lodongie
- Region: Southern Sudan
- Ethnicity: Lopit people
- Native speakers: 120,000 (2017)
- Language family: Nilo-Saharan?: Eastern Sudanic?; Kir–Abbaian?; Nilotic; Eastern Nilotic; Ateker–Lotuko–Maa; Lotuko–Maa; Lotuko; Lopit–Dongotono; Lopit

Language codes
- ISO 639-3: lpx
- Glottolog: lopi1242

The Lopit language is an Eastern Nilotic language spoken by around 117,000 people in Eastern Equatoria State, South Sudan. Lopit is part of the Lotuko-Teso subfamily and is related to Lotuko, Turkana and Maasai. Lopit is a VSO language and has a complex tonal system.

The Lopit language has six different dialects: Ngabori, spoken by the Ngaboli sub-community; Dorik, spoken by the Dorik sub-community; Ngotira, spoken by the Ngotira sub-community; Lomiaha, spoken by the Lomiaha sub-community; Lohutok, spoken by the Lohutok sub-community, and Lolongo, spoken by the Lolongo sub-community. Some small sub-communities or villages (for instance Loming, Ahado, Oriaju, Hidonge and Atarangi) also speak Lotuko due to their proximity to the neighboring Lotuko communities. The dialects have similar segmental phonologies with minor vowel and consonant shifts, and also some tonal variations. Lopit speakers generally group the dialects into Northern Lopit and Southern Lopit.

== Phonology ==
Lopit is a tonal language with 3 tones: high, falling and low.

=== Vowels ===
Lopit has 5 vowels: a, e, i, o, u.

=== Consonants ===
		Labial	Alveolar	Palatal	Velar	Glottal
Nasal		m	n	ɲ	ŋ	
Plosive/ Affricate	voiceless	p	t	t͡ʃ	k	
Plosive/ Affricate	voiced	b	d	d͡ʒ	g	
Fricative			s			h
Approximant		w	l	j		
Trill			r			

== Grammar ==
=== Vowel Harmony ===
Lopit has vowel harmony for prepositions. Prepositions have the suffix /o/ with vowels /o, u/, /e/ with /e, i/, and /a/ with /a/.

Examples:

- rang - the bow
- bok - stable for cows or goats
- heju - legs

=== Gender ===
Lopit has grammatical gender: all nouns belong to either the feminine or masculine gender, but most nouns are not marked overtly for gender. Gender is instead mostly indicated via agreement marking on relative pronouns, demonstratives and possessives.

For some family terms, birds and animals, and agentive nouns, gender is marked with the /lɔ-/ for masculine and either /ɪ-/ or /na/- for feminine.

Examples of Gender Prefixes in Lopit
Verb Stem	Masculine	Feminine	English
ɪsaɡa	lɔsaɡa	ɪsaɡa	Tall person
baŋ	lɔbaŋ	ɪbaŋ	Coward
ŋere	loŋere	iŋere	Brave person
mʊta	lɔmʊta	ɪmʊta	Small person

The masculine gender is largely used for male people, male animals, small creatures and objects. The feminine gender is mostly used for everything else. If a speaker wants to indicate that something is especially large, they can refer to it as feminine, and vice versa for things that are especially small. This makes Lopit fairly unique, as usually the masculine gender is used to denote larger things and is more common than the feminine gender in Eastern Nilotic languages.

For example:

móɾwó lè l-ò-ɲórì
stone.ABS REL.M SBO-3-be.green
'the (small) stone which is green'

móɾwó nà l-ò-ɲórì
stone.ABS REL.F SBO-3-be.green
'the (large) stone which is green'
