= Toposa language =

Eastern Nilotic language of South Sudan

Toposa
- Toposa–Jiye
- Native to: South Sudan
- Region: Eastern Africa
- Ethnicity: Toposa
- Speakers: 320,000 (2017)
- Language family: Nilo-Saharan?: Eastern Sudanic?; Southern Eastern?; Nilotic; Eastern; Ateker–Lotuko–Maa; Ateker; Turkanic; Toposa
- Writing system: none

Language codes
- ISO 639-3: toq
- Glottolog: topo1242

Toposa (also Akara, Kare, Kumi, Taposa, Topotha) is a Nilo-Saharan language (Eastern Sudanic, Nilotic) spoken in South Sudan by the Toposa people. Mutually intelligible language varieties include Jiye of South Sudan, Nyangatom of Ethiopia, Karimojong, Jie and Dodos of Uganda and Turkana of Kenya. Teso (spoken in both Kenya and Uganda) is lexically more distant.

== Phonology ==
=== Consonants ===
| | | Labial | Alveolar | Palatal | Velar |
|---|---|---|---|---|---|
| Plosive | Voiceless | p | t | | k |
| Plosive | Voiced | b | d | | ɡ |
| Affricate | Voiceless | | | t͡ʃ | |
| Affricate | Voiced | | | d͡ʒ | |
| Fricative | | | s | | |
| Nasal | | m | n | ɲ | ŋ |
| Flap | | | r | | |
| Approximant | | w | l | j | |

- All consonants (except, of course, for /w/ and /j/) can occur in labialized and palatalized forms.

=== Vowels ===
+ATR
| | Front | Central | Back |
|---|---|---|---|
| Close | i | | u |
| Mid | e | | o |
| Open | | | |

-ATR
| | Front | Central | Back |
|---|---|---|---|
| Close | ɪ | | ʊ |
| Mid | ɛ | | ɔ |
| Open | | a | |

- Toposa, like many Nilotic languages, has vowel harmony with two sets of vowels: a set with the tongue root advanced (+ATR) and a −ATR set. +ATR is marked. The vowel /a/ is neutral with respect to vowel harmony.
- All nine vowels also occur as devoiced, contrasting with their voiced counterparts. These voiceless vowels occur primarily in prepause contexts. Some Toposa morphemes consist only of a high voiceless vowel; the functional load appears to be much greater with the high vowels than with the lower.
- Toposa has tone, which is grammatical rather than lexical. Tone is used to mark case in nouns and tense in verbs.

== Bibliography ==
- Schröder, Martin C. (1989). "The Toposa Verb in Narrative Structure". Afrikanistische Arbeitspapiere. 20: 129–142.
- Schröder, Martin C.; Helga Schröder (1987a). "Voiceless Vowels in Toposa". Afrikanistische Arbeitspapiere. 12: 17–26.
- Schröder, Martin C.; Helga Schröder (1987b). "Vowel Harmony in Toposa". Afrikanistische Arbeitspapiere. 12: 27–36.
