= Ateker peoples =

Ateker
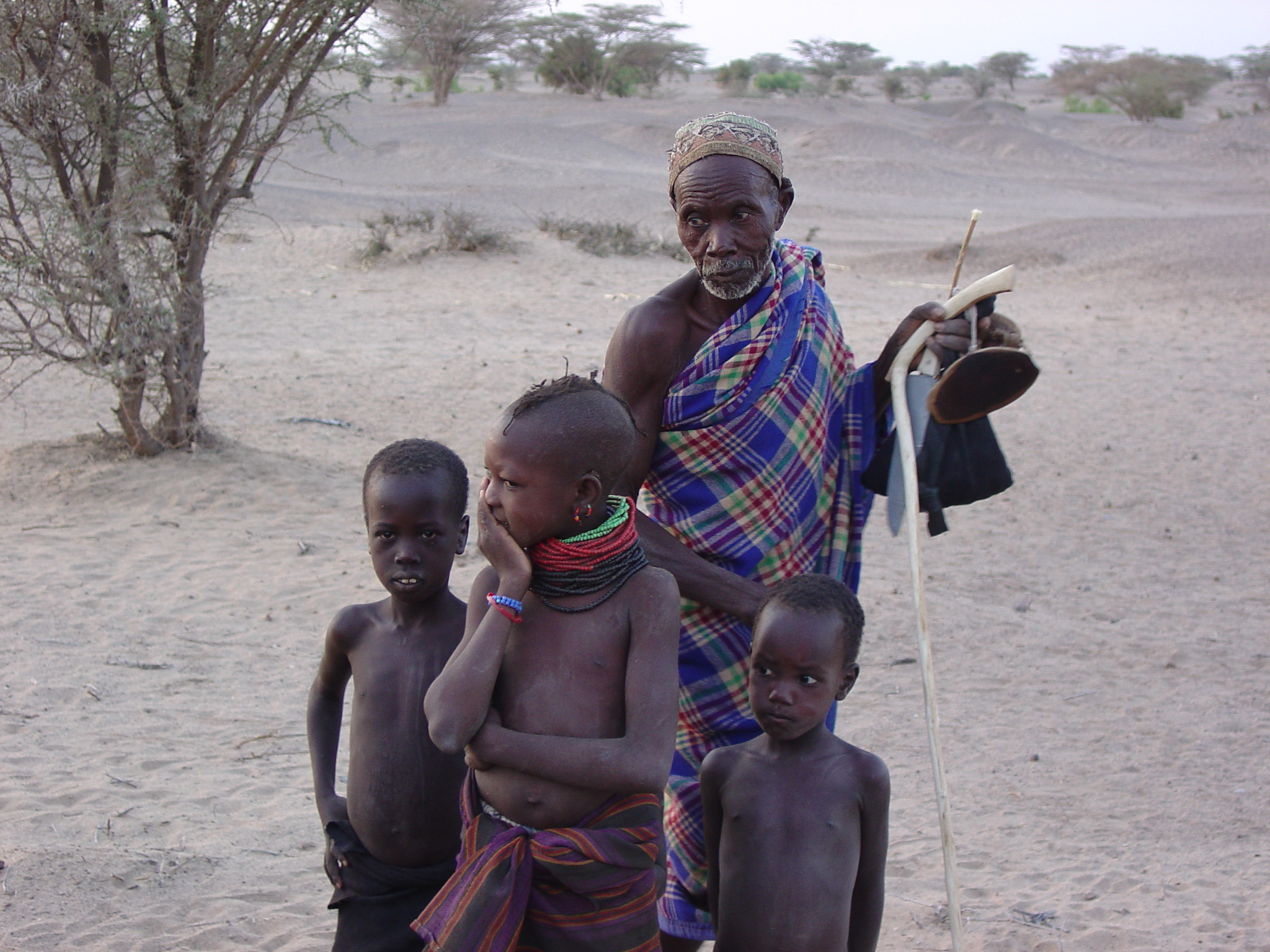

Regions with significant populations
- Kenya, Uganda, South Sudan, Ethiopia

Languages
- Teso-Turkana languages

Religion
- African traditional religion, Christianity

Related ethnic groups
- Other Nilotic peoples

Ateker, or ŋaTekerin, is a common name for the closely related Jie, Karamojong, Turkana, Toposa, Nyangatom, Teso and Lango peoples and their languages. These ethnic groups inhabit an area across Uganda, Kenya, South Sudan and Ethiopia. Itung'a (a vernacular term meaning "people of one language") and Teso have been used among ethnographers, while the term Teso-Turkana is sometimes used for the languages, which are of Eastern Nilotic stock. Ateker means 'clan' or 'tribe' in the Teso language. Atekere in Lango language also means 'clan'.

In the Turkana language, Ateker means a distinct group with related customs, laws and lifestyle and who share a common ancestry. Members of one Ateker have a common character of mutual respect in their diversity. Each member group of Ateker occupies its own territory and exercises authority over its own land and people independent of each other.

The word Ateker is a generic term for "related peoples" or "relatives" (the term also refers to clan). It is derived from the root ker, which has two root meanings: fear and respect. Ateker, in its true sense, is a union of free people with mutual recognition and respect for each other. In the context of ethnic identity and nationhood, the Turkana language classifies different people with common characteristics as belonging to distinct ateker. The Maa people belong to Ateker a Ngi Maasa Maasai and so on. The Turkana and the Karamojong and Lango people belong to one Ateker.

== Karamojong ==
Certain Jie traditions suggest that the Jie formed from the Karamojong; in the narrative, the people that would become Jie are supposed to have broken off by force from their father's the Karamojong at the Apule River, thus earning themselves the sobriquet Ngijie (the fighting people). Moving back north east, they established themselves at Koten Hill where the group that would ultimately become Turkana broke away peacefully and descended the escarpment into the Tarash.

== Jie ==
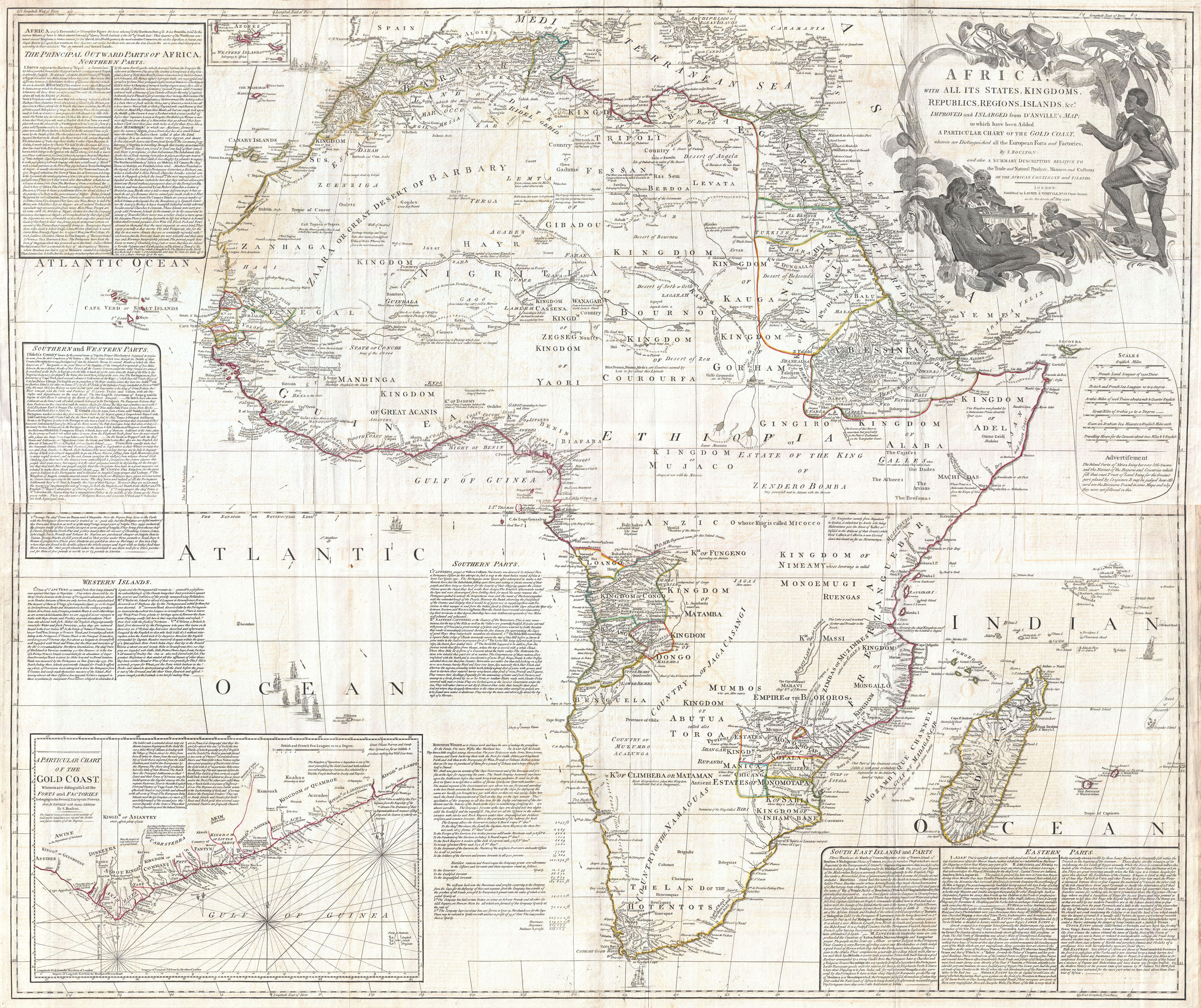
1794 Boulton and Anville Wall Map of Africa: Locates 'Gingiro Kingdom' in a region corresponding roughly to southern Sudan, northeastern Uganda, and northwestern Kenya.

The ancestral cradleland of the Jie and descendant communities is thought to lie in Longiro, 'the place of engiro' in the Sudan. A 1794 Boulton and Anville wall map of Africa places a ‘Gingiro Kingdom’ at least as far east as southern Sudan, northeastern Uganda, and northwestern Kenya at this time, broadly aligning with the area remembered in oral traditions.

The story of Nayeche and the Gray Bull, a tale shared by the Jie and Turkana is an origin tale that is thought to speak about 17th and 18th century history of these communities.

In the tale, the Gray Bull (Engiro) was captured many centuries ago along the banks of the Longiro river by Orwakol, founder of the Jie peoples. This bull would go on to father all Jie cattle but during a very hot dry season he went missing. Nayeche, the daughter of Orwakol, followed Engiro's tracks to the headwaters of the Tarash River. Here she found the water that had attracted Engiro, and also such abundant fruit on the nearby hillside that she decided to stay. She was later found by Jie men who were searching for pasture, and they too were so impressed by the quality of the land that they returned to tell the Jie about Nayeche's discovery. This inspired a number of families to migrate to the area with their families and cattle. When Nayeche later died they buried her at the foot of the mountain now known as Moru a Nayeche and called themselves Turkana.

== Turkana ==
According to traditions recorded by Wilson (1970), the Jie advanced eastward and entered the present Karimoja territory at Adilang, an area that was at this time occupied by the Maliri. The nature of contact seems to have been hostile for the Maliri retreated eastwards toward the region of Koten Mountain where they stayed for a while. This state of affairs did not hold for long, for the people from the hill of Turkan, now calling themselves Turkana, broke away from the Jie at Kotido and started advancing eastward. This brought extreme pressure to bear on the Maliri at Koten, causing this group to break in two; the Merille and a group called Pokotozek.

=== Loikop interaction ===
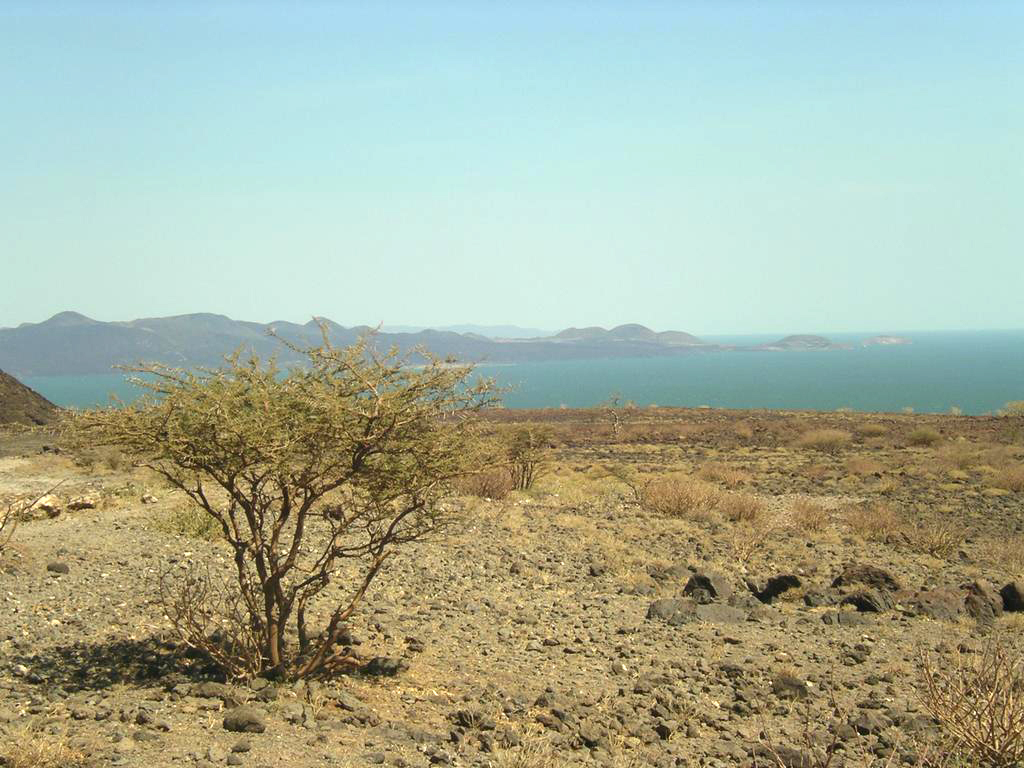
Turkana landscape

In pushing eastward the Turkana had arrived at a dramatic ecological and cultural frontier. All the way to the shores of Lake Turkana lay arid land peppered with the occasional cultivatable oasis. This hard country was inhabited by communities that were radically different from any the Turkana had encountered before. There were three communities already resident, who lived in close association with each other, herding an array of livestock which included exotic creatures with long necks and humps on their backs - the first camels the Ateker had encountered.

Of the three societies, one appears to have made the most impact on the Turkana, they kept sheep, goats and camels like their associates but specialized in cattle. They had lighter-colored skin compared to the Turkana and they liberally smeared themselves with ochre - the Turkana called them the 'red people' and named them Kor. The Kor's kin were known to the Turkana as Rantalle and Poran. Together these allies controlled all the land stretching out before the Turkana to the east.

=== Siger interaction ===
Turkana folklore records that as their early settlements expanded north, they reached a hill which came to be known as Moru Ang'issiger where they met another group of 'red people' who herded a distinctive type of long-horned black cattle. It was said that this community once held most of the surrounding country until the Kor and their allies came up from the south and took it from them. Most of the women of this community had an adornment of a single cowrie shell attached to a forelock. This dangling cowrie shell was referred to as esigirait, pl. ngisigira (Karamoja). The Turkana called them Siger and their home Moru Ang'issiger, (later Mt. Siger/Mt. Sekker).

As the end of the 18th century approached, demographic pressure started being felt by the Turkana. All the available grazing lands to west - the direction the Turkana had come from, was occupied by other Ateker societies of the Karamojong and to the east lay the lands of the formidable confederacy of the Kor, Rantalle and Poran. The Turkana thus turned their gaze north to the territory of the weakened Siger, and, coveting their highland pastures, began to encroach on them, just as the Rift Valley was seized by a terrible drought.

=== Amalgamation ===
Turkana traditions noted by Lamphear (1988) concerning the early Turkana community, note that the developing community "formed itself into two 'major parts', the Curo and the Monia". These traditions however seem to suggest an amalgamation of two distinct communities.

Women of each major part could be distinguished by dress, and each group is said to have lived in its separate, but adjacent, territory and shared the water of a common well. At the same time, family traditions present a picture of close association growing up between certain clans, often derived from frequent intermarriage, which sometimes transcended the distinctions between major parts.

— John Lamphear, 1988 (Emley's paraphrase)

Lamphear records population groupings that emerged from this assimilation and of population dispersal. He notes that the two major groups took on a common name 'Turkana' while some settlers abandoned the Tarash to move south to the area beyond Mount Elgon. He also notes that about the same time some far-ranging contingents of Bantu-speaking Meru were absorbed by several Turkana clans.

Other Turkana traditions recorded by Emley seem to confirm this narrative though with somewhat different terms. These traditions state that the expansion to Turkwel had been carried out by two ateker, the 'Nithir' and the 'Ngamatak'. At Turkwel, the Nithir split in two, one section retaining the original name while the other was known as 'Nibelai'. Thus formed the three Turkana 'adakari' (i.e ateker) of the early 20th century, the Ngamatak, Nithir and Nibelai.

The Nithir name was said to derive from 'ithiger' (i.e Siger), an 'ornament' and the Nithir were said to be so called for their love of decoration. As of 1888, Ngamtak was the name of the south-western frontier of Turkana territory.

== Shared culture ==
=== Language ===
The Ateker speak distinct languages which developed from one common language. While similar, the Ateker languages vary due to the regions they occupied and the communities around them, having borrowed some of their words from the assimilated minorities or neighbouring people. Despite their similarities all the Ateker languages are distinctive, naturally one can be able to identify the difference.

=== Laws and customs ===
Each Ateker has distinct laws and customs. The laws and customs of people of one Ateker are similar.

Generally, it is traditionally forbidden to kill a fellow member of an Ateker, as such an act is considered equivalent to killing a brother. Customary laws also regulate various aspects of social life, including marriage (akuuta), grazing rights, and conflict resolution. Intermarriage within the same Ateker is traditionally prohibited, as marriage is viewed as a means of forging alliances between different Ngatekerin (plural of Ateker). Divorce (elakit or akilak) is managed through customary processes, with representatives from both families working to resolve disputes before separation is sanctioned.

Elders play a central role in overseeing communal matters, including the management of grazing lands (achok or akitwar) and the conduct of important cultural ceremonies (akiriket), such as those for rainmaking, peacebuilding, and the annual blessing of livestock (akero).

=== Lifestyle ===
Members of each Ateker live their lives in a similar lifestyle. Diversified groups within one Ateker usually have traces of laws and customs that can be traced to the original group.

=== Land ===
Land is one characteristic that helps in determining membership in an Ateker. Members of one Ateker usually occupy adjoining areas. Land adjudication forms the basis for laws and customs. In the Turkana Ateker, land is subdivided into regions or territorial sections, ŋiTela. Each Ekitela institutes its own common laws which are derived from the general laws of the whole nation or kingdom.

=== Religion ===
Religious beliefs of one Ateker are similar. The supreme deity worshiped has one common name.

=== Common ancestry ===
Members of one Ateker have a common ancestral origin. Members of Ateker have different ancestral origin. within the Ateker subdivisions of the Turkana/Ngiturukana and the Karimojong/Ngikarimojong, the Karimojong/ngikarimojong subscribe to Nakadanya which is believed to be the holly ground for Ngimatheniko/Ngikori (Moroto District), Ngipian/Ngimuriai (nabilatuk and Nakapiripirit Districts), Ngibokora (Napak District) and the Dodoth/ngikaleeso of Kaabong and Karenga Districts. the Turkana/Ngiturkana of Northwestern Kenya are subscribed to Moru-anayiece as their holly and Ancestral ground. However, they speak related languages and can hear each other.
