= Dongotono language =

Eastern Nilotic language of South Sudan

Dongotono
- Dongotono
- Region: South Sudan
- Ethnicity: Dongotono people
- Native speakers: 5,000 (2013)
- Language family: Nilo-Saharan?: Eastern Sudanic?; Kir–Abbaian?; Nilotic; Eastern Nilotic; Ateker–Lotuko–Maa; Lotuko–Maa; Lotuko; Lopit–Dongotono; Dongotono

Language codes
- ISO 639-3: Either: ddd – Dongotono oie – Okolie
- Glottolog: dong1301 Dongotonic dong1294 Dongotono

Dongotono (Dongotono pronunciation: [dóŋòtónò]) is an Eastern Nilotic language spoken by an estimated 5,000 people in South Sudan.

== Classification ==
Dongotono has been classified as a member of the Eastern Nilotic branch of Nilotic, in the Eastern Sudanic sub-grouping of Nilo-Saharan. Within Eastern Nilotic, Dongotono is considered part of the Lotuko language group, in the Lotuko-Maa branch of Teso-Lotuko-Maa (also referred to as the non-Bari languages). Other members of the Lotuko language group include Lopit, Lotuko, Lokoya and Lango, all spoken in nearby regions of in South Sudan. Of these languages, Lopit is most similar to Dongotono, with a comparative study showing 66.4% lexical similarity between the two. The same study showed 60.6% lexical similarity between Dongotono and Lotuko, and 56.5% similarity between Dongotono and Lokoya.

== Geographic distribution ==
The Dongotono language is spoken by the Dongotono people, who live on the north-western slopes of the Dongotono Mountains in the southern part of Eastern Equatoria State, South Sudan. Administratively, this area is part of Ikotos County, and the Dongotono live in large and densely populated settlements which include Chakari, Ikotos, Isoke and Chorokol,. There are an estimated 5,000 speakers of the language, and the language is considered threatened, though the number of Dongotono people may be as much as 35,000.

== Phonology ==
There has been very little research on Dongotono, but some tentative phonological and morphological observations can be found in Vossen (1982), based on wordlist data collected in the 1970s. Vossen notes that the data are too limited to draw any safe conclusions. He observed that the phoneme inventories of Dongotono, Lokoya and Lopit were similar enough to be treated together, and provided a consonant inventory for all three languages together, represented in the table below.

=== Consonants ===
	Labial		Lab-dent	Dental		Alveolar		Palatal		Velar		Glottal
Nasal		m					n		ɲ		ŋ	
Stop	p	b		t̪	d̪	tː		c	ɟ	k	g	(ʔ)
Stop	(pː)											
Fricative	(ɸ)		(f)			s				(x)		
Lateral							l					
Rhotic							r					
Approximant		w									j	
Approximant		wː									jː	

The voiced palatal stop /ɟ/ is described as implosive (/ʄ/). Vossen also notes that /b/ is interchangeable with implosive [ɓ], and /d/ is interchangeable with implosive [ɗ]. /p/ does not occur word-initially in Vossen's Dongotono data, and is replaced by [f] or [ɸ] between vowels. /pː/ does not seem to be present in Dongotono. /k/ is replaced by [x] in certain environments but is retained in others. There are no examples the voiced velar stop /g/ in Vossen's Dongotono data. The glottal stop /ʔ/ occurs word-finally only. The glides /wː/ and /jː/ are only found word-medially.

=== Vowels ===
According to Vossen, Dongotono has two sets of five vowels, distinguished by the phonological feature advanced tongue root ([ATR]). These are listed in the table below.

	Front		Back	
	[+ATR]	[-ATR]	[+ATR]	[-ATR]
Close	i	ɪ	u	ʊ
Close-mid	e		o	
Open-mid		ɛ		ɔ
Open			a	a

However, Vossen notes that no different symbols were used for [+ATR] /a/ and [-ATR] /a/ "as they cannot be distinguished phonetically".

Vossen finds no examples of vowel length being contrastive in Dongotono. He observes that vowel harmony plays an important role, but does not describe the process.

=== Tone ===
Vossen observes that on the surface there are four tones in Dongotono: High, Low, Mid, and High-Falling. They appear to be used for both lexical and grammatical contrasts.

== Grammar ==
Word order in Dongotono is generally Verb-Subject-Object, as is typical for most Eastern Nilotic languages.

Vossen states that for all the non-Bari languages, including Dongotono, the verbs fall into two morphological classes, conventionally called Class 1 and Class 2. Class 2 verbs have a stem with an initial close-front vowel /i-/ or /ɪ-/, and Class 1 verb stems are consonant-initial. A number of possible verbal affixes were observed but their functions not determined.

Number-marking on nouns appears to be extremely irregular. A variety of suffixes are used to indicate singular, singulative, and plural.

Like other languages in the Lotuko group, Dongotono has two grammatical genders, masculine and feminine.

== Vocabulary ==
Some example Dongotono words are given below, from the wordlist in Vossen (1982). Each Dongotono word is in the phonetic transcription used by Vossen, as there is not yet an established orthography for the language.

English	Dongotono
sun	kɔlɔŋ
moon	afa
mountain	dôŋé
river	kárɪ́
mouth	kûtûk
hand	kání
tree	sánì
grass	ñyàrí
water	kárí
fire	chɪ́mà
animal	tíàŋ
bird	kwenyí
snake	mʊ́nʊ́
