= Nyangatom =

Nyangatom may refer to:

- Nyangatom people, of Ethiopia and South Sudan
- Nyangatom language
- Nyangatom (woreda), a district in the Southern Nations, Nationalities, and Peoples' Region, Ethiopia
