= Lotuko =

Lotuko may refer to:

- the Lotuko people
- the Lotuko language
