= Toposa =

Toposa may refer to:

- Toposa people
- Toposa language
