= Imatong =

Imatong refers to:

- Imatong State, one of the 28 states of South Sudan
- Imatong county, a former region of the Southern Sudanese state of Eastern Equatoria
- Imatong Mountains, a range in southern Sudan
- Imatong people, an ethnic group living in the Southern Sudanese state of Eastern Equatoria
