= Tobong'u Lore =

Celebration of indigenous culture

Lake Turkana Cultural Festival Tobong'u Lore
- Ostrich feather caps used in the Turkana ceremonial headress
- Frequency: Annually
- Locations: Turkana County, including Lodwar and Loiyangalani
- Years active: 2008–present
- Inaugurated: June 1, 2008; 18 years ago
- Attendance: Thousands
- Budget: 33-70 million Kenyan shillings

The Tobong'u Lore, known in English as the Lake Turkana Cultural Festival, is a celebration of indigenous culture held every spring in Turkana, northern Kenya. The festival is hosted by a number of indigenous communities adjacent to the lake, and is meant to promote peace, cultural exchange, and tourism. The El Molo people host the festival in Loiyangalani every June, and the Turkana people host the festival in Lodwar in April. The Tobong'u Lore is considered among the largest of cultural festivals in Kenya, and has become a venue for appearances by prominent Kenyan politicians.

== Scope ==
The festival in Loiyangalani was first held in 2008 as a mechanism of promoting peace and cooperation among the communities that border Lake Turkana. In Lodwar, the festival began being held in 2014. Participating communities, which extend across national borders, include the Turkana, the Dassanech, the Samburu, the Somali, the Borana, the Gabbra, the Rendille, the Sakuye, the Wata, the Burji, the Garee, the Konso, and the El Molo people. The festival's creation was supported by the National Museums of Kenya and the German Government, and coincided with the opening of a museum in the town.

The festival attracts thousands of visitors every year. Some visitors are from countries that border Kenya, including Ethiopia, Sudan, and Uganda. A delegation from Nigeria has also attended. Turkana County officials state that the festival is intended in part to promote tourism and development. The Tobong'u Lore is one of a number of initiatives advanced by the Kenyan government to promote cultural tourism and preserve local culture among smaller ethnic groups in Kenya.

The phrase "Tobong'u Lore" means "welcome back home" in the Turkana language. The phrase is a reference to the archaeological and paleontological heritage of the Turkana Basin.

In 2019 Turkana officials reduced spending on the festival from 70 million Kenyan Shillings to 33, diverting funds to address a local drought crisis.

== Activities ==
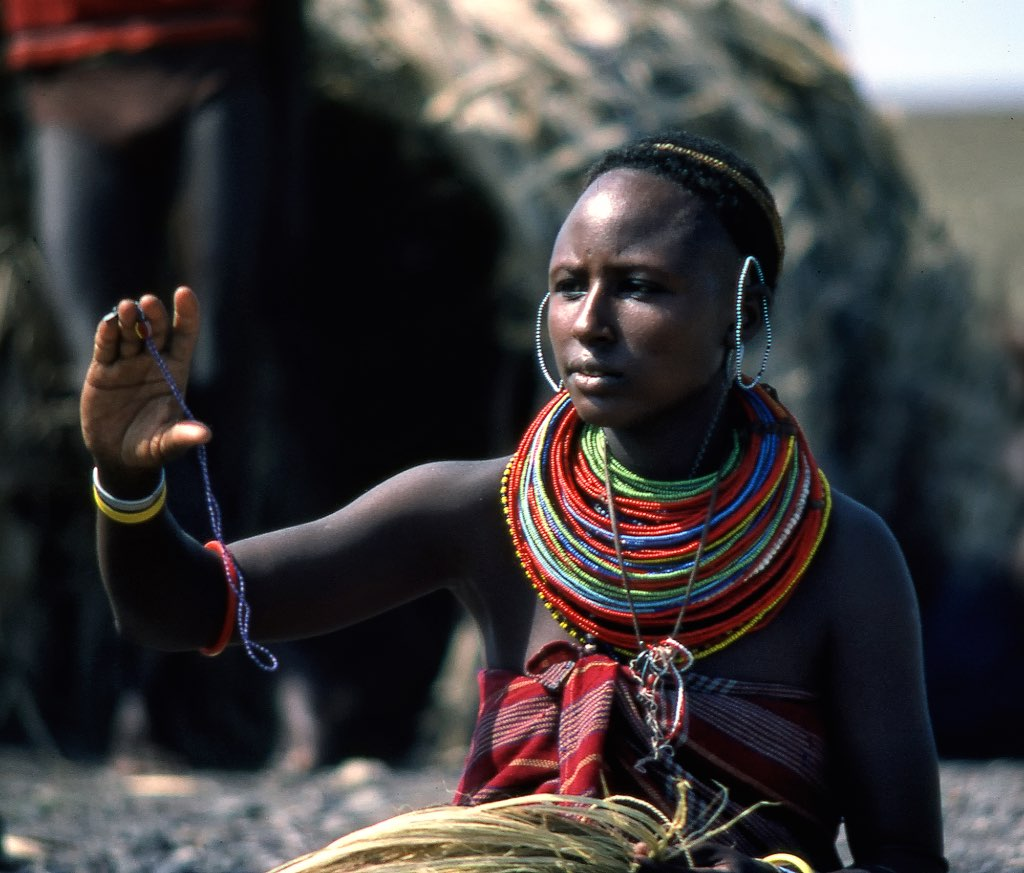
A woman from the El Molo community, which has helped host Tobong'u Lore cultural festivals around Lake Turkana.

The festival features local culture, nature, and archeological heritage. Participants wear traditional attire during ceremonies. Activities include a three-day carnival, with music and dance from local groups, and speeches by local leaders. Consistent with local customs, the festivities continue after sundown.

Exhibitions promote local crafts and food. The protection of wildlife is another theme addressed by the festival.

== Political appearances ==
Many Kenyan officials have attended the festival, and some politicians have used the event to make announcements related to political campaigns or policies. In 2019 the festival was attended by former Prime Minister Raila Odinga and by the Deputy President William Ruto; in 2020 Governor Kivutha Kibwana used the festival as a venue to announce his bid for the presidency in upcoming elections.

== See also ==
- Culture of Kenya
- Demographics of Kenya
- The Kenya Schools and Colleges Drama Festival
- Maragoli Cultural Festival
- Rusinga (Cultural) Festival
