= Turkana people =

Ethnic group of Eastern Africa

Turkana
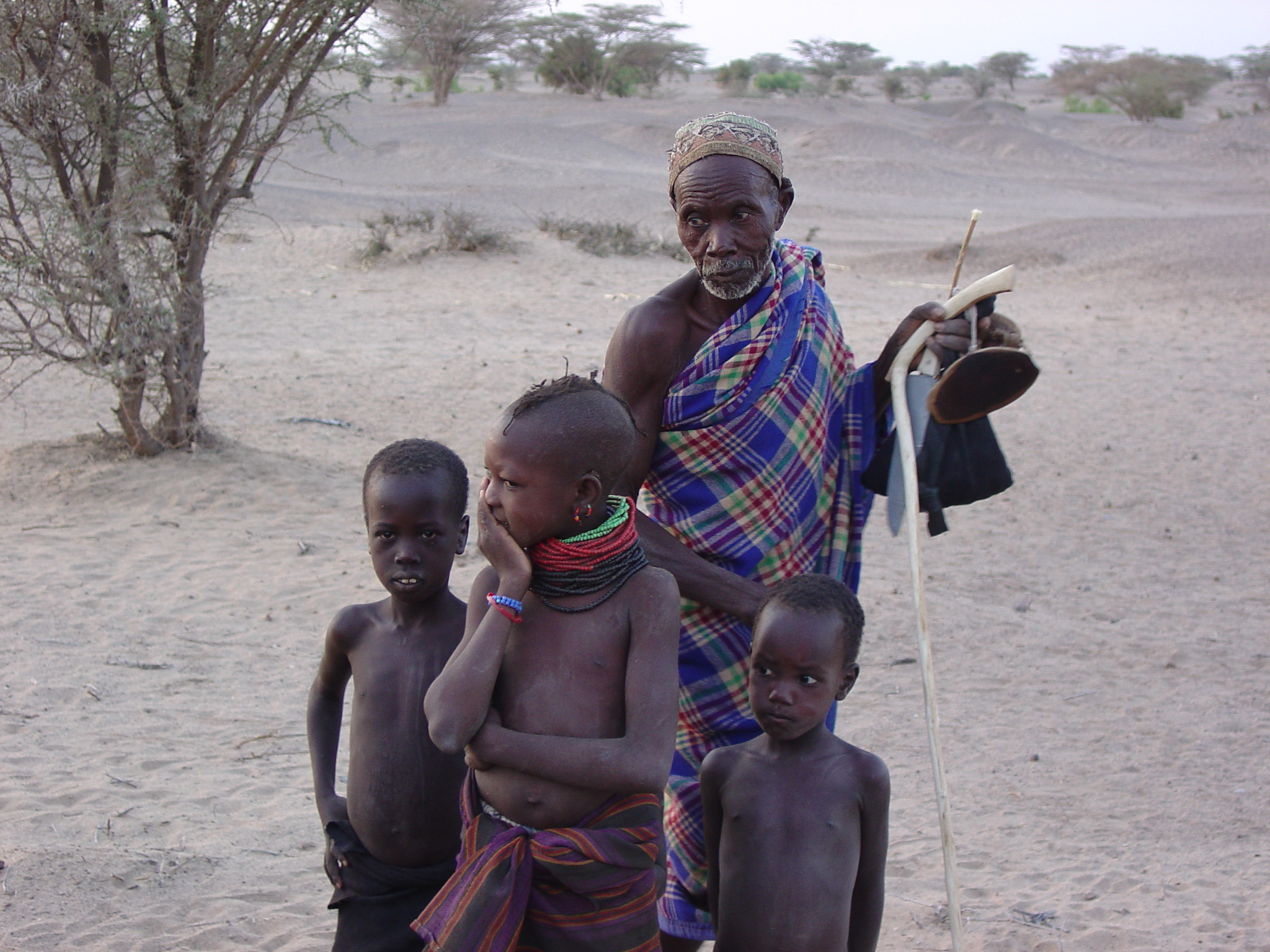
- Turkana man with traditional Turkana clothing

Total population
- 1,016,174

Languages
- Turkana and Swahili

Related ethnic groups
- Other Ateker peoples and other Nilotic peoples

The Turkana are a Nilotic people native to the Turkana County in northwest Kenya, a semi-arid climate region bordering Lake Turkana in the east, Pokot, Rendille and Samburu people to the south, Uganda to the west, South Sudan to the north-west (Didinga and Toposa) and Ethiopia to the north.

== Overview ==
According to the 2009 Kenyan census, Turkana number 1,016,174, or 2.14% of the Kenyan population, making the Turkana the third largest Nilotic ethnic group in Kenya, after the Kalenjin and the Luo, slightly more numerous than the Maasai, and the tenth largest ethnicity in all of Kenya. Although this figure was initially controversial and rejected as too large by the then Planning Minister Wycliffe Oparanya, a court ruling (February 7, 2012) by Justice Mohammed Warsame stated that the Kenyan government accepts the 2009 census figures for Turkana.

They refer to themselves as ŋiTurkana (i.e. ngiTurkana, meaning the Turkana, or people of Turkan) and to their land as "Turkan". The language of the Turkana, an Eastern Nilotic language, is also called Turkana; their own name for it is ŋaTurkana or aŋajep a ŋiTurkana. The ethnic group as a whole is composed of two major divisions, each of which is composed of further territorial sections. The major divisions are the Ngimonia, divided into Ngisir and non-Ngisir sections; and the Ngichuuro, divided into the Ngilukumong, Ngiwoyakwara, Ngikamatak, Ngibilai, and Ngikebotok.

They are mainly semi-nomadic pastoralists, and are noted for raising camels and weaving baskets. In their oral traditions, they designate themselves the people of the grey bull, after the Zebu, the domestication of which played an important role in their history. In recent years, development aid programs have aimed at introducing fishing among the Turkana (a taboo in some sections of The Turkana society) with very limited success.

== History ==
=== Origins ===
The Turkana entered Turkana basin from the north as one unit of the Ateker confederation. This cluster split as a result of internal differences, leading to the emergence of distinct independent groups. The Turkana people emerged as a victorious group in the subsequent conflict, which led to enmity between the Turkana and other Ateker cluster groups, who formed military alliances against the Turkana. The Turkana emerged victorious again by co-opting young people from conquered groups. The military power and wealth of the Turkana increased in what is now the northern plains of Turkana. Turkana tradition often states that the cultivation of Zebu cattle and the rise of the diviners (ngimurok) allowed the Turkana to accrue such wealth and power. Both Zebu and the ngimurok continue to play an important role in Turkana culture today.

=== Establishment ===
The establishment of the Turkana people developed as a distinct group which expanded southwards conquering ethnic nations south of its borders. The Turkana people easily conquered groups it came in contact with by employing superior tactics, weapons, and military organization. By the 1600s, the Turkana basin had been fully occupied by the Turkana and their allies.

Subsequently, there was a period of relative peace among the indigenous ethnic communities of the region, which lasted until the onset of the European colonization of Africa. There were, however, sporadic skirmishes between the Turkana and Arab, Swahili, and Abyssinian slave raiders and ivory traders.

=== Colonial period ===
During the late 19th and early 20th centuries, the British Empire gradually expanded across East Africa, coming into conflict with the Turkana. In 1926, the British colonial administration in Kenya "effectively gained control" over the Turkana people and forcibly confined them to the Turkana District.

During the First and Second World Wars, Turkana recruits enlisted in the King's African Rifles (KAR), a British colonial regiment. In the KAR, Turkana soldiers served against Italian forces in the East African campaign. After World War II, a number of Turkana people were forcibly relocated to the Turkana District by the colonial administration.

== Culture ==
=== Clothing ===
Traditionally, both men and women wear wraps made of rectangular woven materials and animal skins. Today, these clothes are manufactured in Nairobi or elsewhere in Kenya. Often, men wear their wraps similar to tunics, with one end connected with the other end over the right shoulder and carry wrist knives made of steel and goat hide. Men also carry stools (known as ekicholong) and will use these for simple chairs rather than sitting on the hot midday sand. These stools also double as headrests, keeping one's head elevated from the sand, and protecting any ceremonial head decorations from being damaged. It is also not uncommon for men to carry several staves; one is used for walking and balance when carrying loads; the other, usually slimmer and longer, is used to prod livestock during herding activities. Women will customarily wear necklaces and will shave their hair completely or wear their hair with beads attached to the loose ends of hair. Men wear their hair shaved. Women wear two pieces of cloth, one wrapped around the waist while the other covers the top. Traditionally leather wraps covered with ostrich eggshell beads were the norm for women's undergarments, though these are now uncommon in many areas.

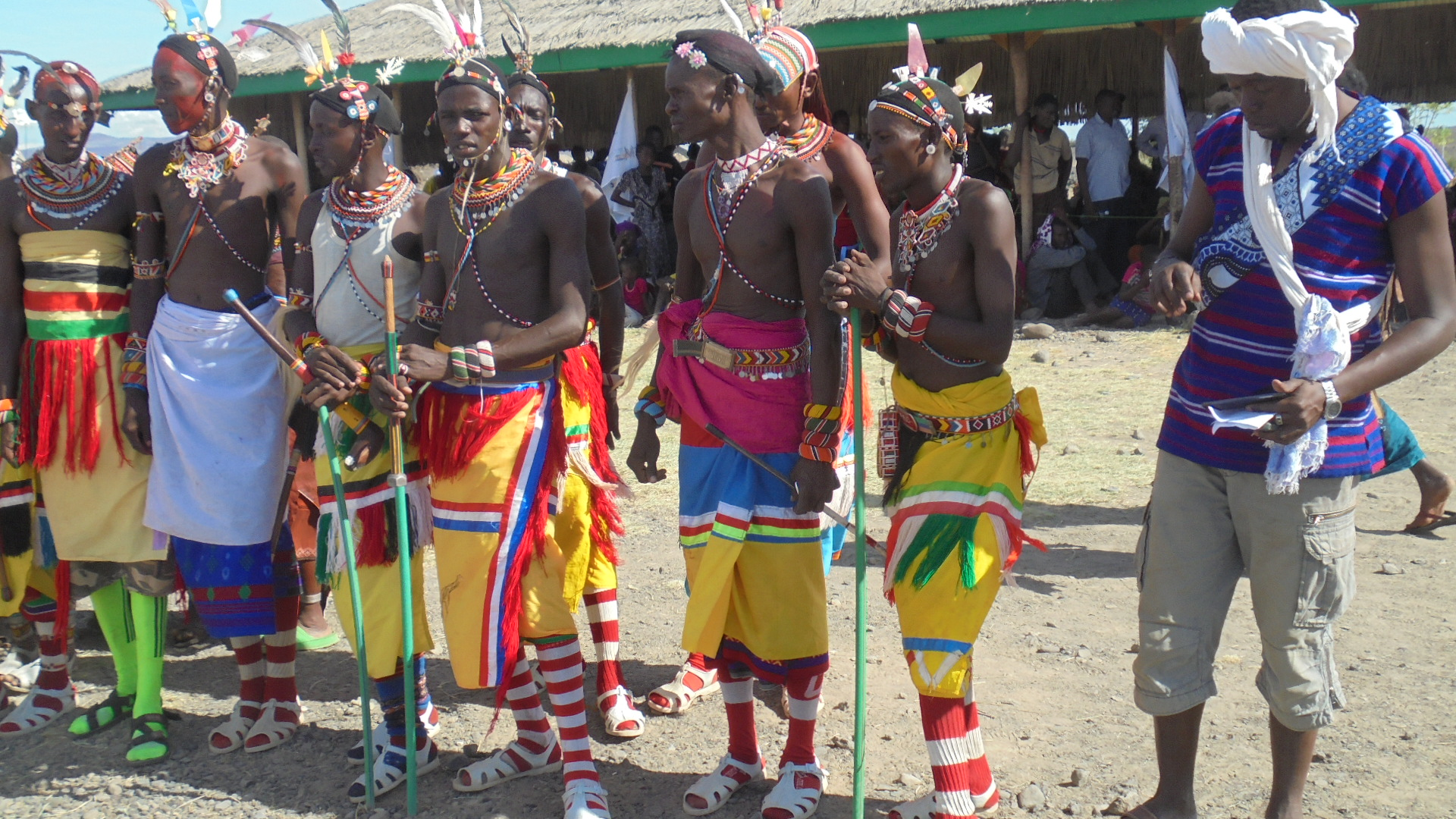
Turkana men in Kenya

The Turkana people have elaborate clothing and adornment styles. Clothing is used to distinguish between age groups, development stages, occasions, and the status of individuals or groups in the Turkana community.

Today, many Turkana have adopted western-style clothing. This is especially prominent among both men and women who live in town centers throughout Turkana.

=== Livestock ===
The Turkana rely on several rivers, such as the Turkwel River and Kerio River. When these rivers flood, new sediment, and water extend onto the river plain that is cultivated after heavy rainstorms, which occur infrequently. When the rivers dry up, open-pit wells are dug in the riverbed; these are used for providing water to the livestock and also for human consumption. There are few, if any, developed wells for community and livestock drinking water, and often families must travel several hours searching for water for their livestock and themselves.

Livestock is an important aspect of Turkana culture. Goats, camels, donkeys and zebu are the primary herd stock utilized by the Turkana people. In this society, livestock functions not only as a milk and meat producer but as a form of currency used for bride-price negotiations and dowries. Often, a young man will be given a single goat with which to start a herd, and he will accumulate more via animal husbandry. In turn, once he has accumulated sufficient livestock, these animals will be used to negotiate for wives. It is not uncommon for Turkana men to lead polygynous lifestyles since livestock wealth will determine the number of wives each can negotiate for and support.

Livestock also plays an important part in interactions between the Turkana and other neighboring groups and is an important aspect of warfare in the region. Raids are not unusual in Turkana society and most of the time raids are conducted it is to steal cattle from neighboring groups such as the Taposa and the Pokot. In some cases, such raids have led to intense conflict in which dozens or even hundreds of people are injured or killed. In his book, Cattle bring us to our enemies: Turkana ecology, politics, and raiding in a disequilibrium system, J. Terrence McCabe cites several incidents in which raiding caused several deaths. McCabe notes that such raids often occur between the Turkana and the Pokot and that raiding seems to have increased in intensity over the last few years.

=== Food ===
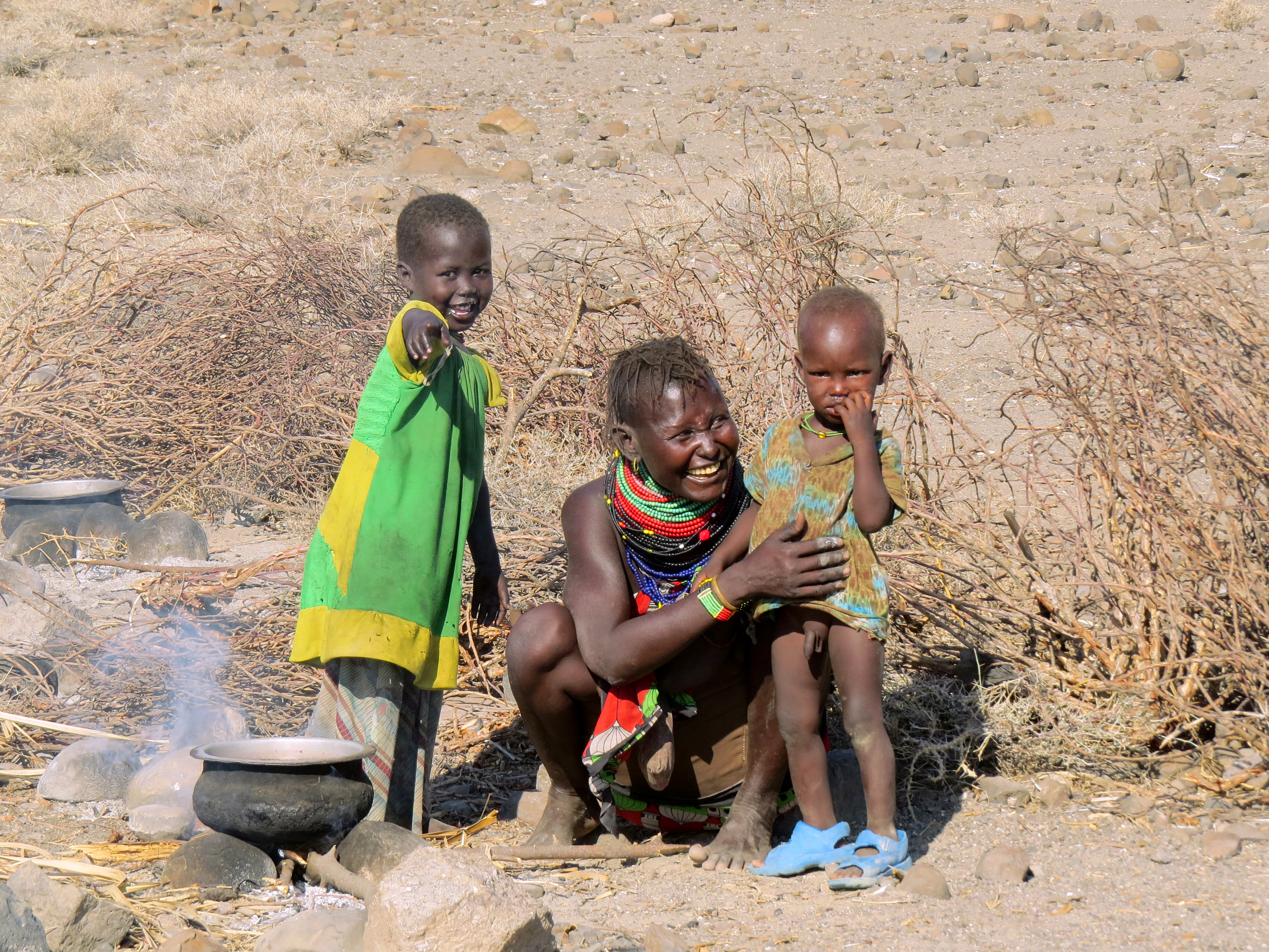
Turkana mother preparing a meal.

The Turkana people rely on their animals for milk and meat. Wild fruits are gathered by women from the bushes and cooked for up to 12 hours. Slaughtered goats are often roasted on a fire. Roasting is the favored method for preparing meat. The Turkana often trade with the Pokots for maize, beans, and vegetables, and with the Marakwet for tobacco. The Turkana buy tea from the towns and make milk tea. In the morning, people eat maize porridge with milk, while for lunch and dinner, they eat plain maize porridge (nang'aria) with a stew. Zebu is only eaten during festivals, while goat is consumed more frequently. Fish is taboo for some of the Turkana clans (or brands, ngimacharin). After the hunt, men go out again to gather honey, which is the only natural sweetener available in traditional diets.

While the Turkana mainly rely on pastoralism they also cultivate some of their food. Multiple studies have made note of sorghum cultivation in Turkana society. One such study, Sorghum Gardens in South Turkana: Cultivation among a Nomadic Pastoral People, notes that, while sorghum cultivation is quite productive, it is more limited by environmental factors than pastoralism. The Jie, a longtime ally of the Turkana, have sometimes been known to gift sorghum to the Turkana.

=== Houses ===
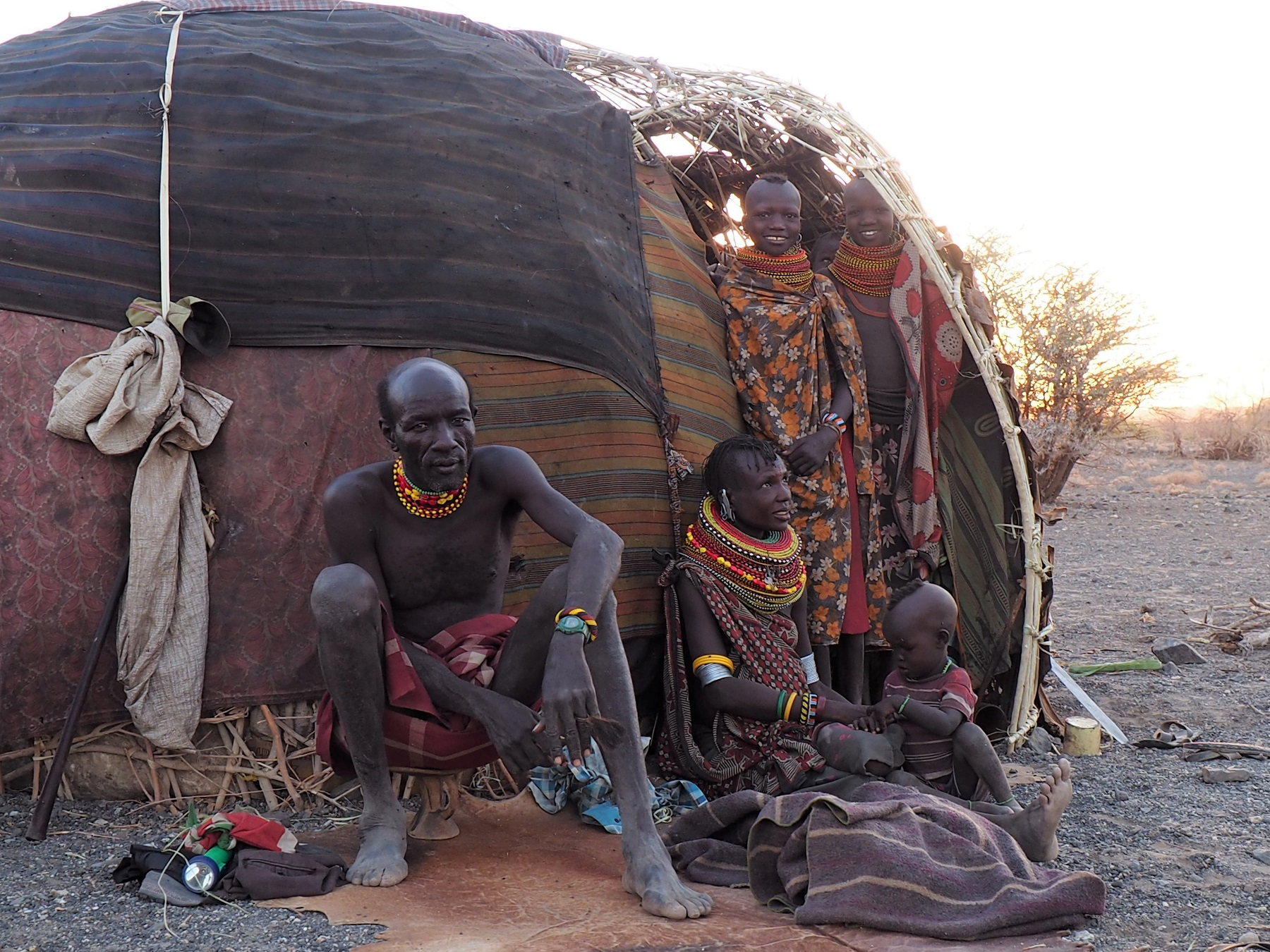
Turkana family

Houses are constructed over a wooden framework of domed saplings on which fronds of the doum palm (Hyphaene thebaica), hides or skins, are thatched and lashed on. The house is large enough to house a family of six. Usually, during the wet season, they are elongated and covered with cow dung. Animals are kept in a brushwood pen. Due to changes in the climatic conditions, most Turkana has started changing from the traditional method of herding cattle to agro-pastoralism.

=== Traditional religion ===
No clear boundary is drawn between the sacred and the profane in Turkana society. In this regard, Turkana traditional religion is not differentiated from Turkana social structure or epistemological reality—the religion and the culture are one. The Turkana are pastoralists, whose lives are shaped by the extreme climate in which they live. Each day, one must seek to find the blessings of life—water, food, livestock and children—in a manner that appeases the ancestral spirits and is in harmony with the peace within the community. Properly following the traditions (ngitalio) in daily life will certainly lead to blessings. Blessings are understood to be an increase in wealth, whether livestock, children or even food. It is only through proper relationships with God (Akuj) and the ancestors, proper protection from evil, and participation in the moral economy of the community that one can be blessed.

Essentially, the Turkana people believe in the reality of a Supreme Being named Akuj. Not much is known about Akuj other than the fact that he alone created the world and is in control of the blessings of life. There is also a belief in the existence of ancestors, ngipean or ngikaram, yet these are seen to be malevolent, requiring animal sacrifices to be appeased when angry. When angered or troubled, the ancestors will possess people in the family in order to verbally communicate with their family. There is also the recognition of “The Ancestor”, Ekipe, who is seen as much more active in the everyday lives of people, yet only in negative ways. There is much concern over protecting one's family and oneself from the evil of the Ekipe. Turkana Christians and missionaries equate ekipe with the biblical character of the Devil or Satan and this has shifted more traditional understandings of ekipe away from “an evil spirit” to “The Evil one”. Turkana religious specialists, ngimurok, continue to act as intermediaries between living people and ancestors and also help in problem-solving in communities. The Arabs also brought Islam to the people and hence the men wear the cap whether they are Muslims or not.

==== Ngimurok ====
As in most African traditional religions, traditional religious specialists in Turkana are present and play an active role in almost every community event. Ngimurok help to identify both the source of evil, sickness, or other problems that present themselves and the solution or specific cure or sacrifice that needs to take place in order to restore abundant life in the family and the community. There are various types of diviners differentiated by the emuron’s source of revelation. According to Barrett, the “true diviners,” also known as the “diviners of God”, are the most respected of the ngimurok because they receive revelations directly from Akuj, normally through dreams. These “true diviners” follow in the pattern of the most famous Turkana ngimurok, Lokerio and Lokorijem. The latter regularly received dreams from Akuj, supposedly informing him of the location of British colonialists during early 20th century, and the former is said to have used the power and knowledge of God to divide Lake Turkana so that Turkana warriors could walk across the lake to raid camels.

These ngimurok of God can still be found throughout Turkana, each in their own territory, alongside specialized ngimurok who have received specific abilities to read tea leaves, tobacco, intestines, shoes, stones and string. There are also hidden evil specialists, ngikasubak, who use objects in secret to work against people in the community, and ngikapilak, who specialize in pronouncing very strong curses employing the use of body parts from those recently deceased, but these are not included in the term emuron. Ngimurok are the people that Akuj and the Fathers speak to in dreams; they are also the ones who can communicate with the ancestors to discern what sort of animal sacrifice is needed to restore peace, bring rain, find a remedy for a child's illness, or who can properly bless the families at a wedding.

The ngimurok in each area receives direct revelations from Akuj, who is still directly active and concerned with the creation. These ngimurok do not speak or receive messages through an intermediary god or spirit through possession. While ancestor possessions are common in Turkana, they normally occur among younger people at the home, so that the ancestor can communicate their message to those in the home. The emuron would then be consulted as to what should be done. Ngimurok are not known as people who are normally possessed. Apart from the ngimurok, there are also important clan rituals in Turkana that represent the acknowledgment and transitions of life force. The most important rituals are the birth rituals (aikido), male and female initiation rituals (aspen and akinyonyo; these do not include circumcision), marriage rituals (Akuuta), annual blessing sacrifices (Apiaret an awi), and death rituals (Akinuuk). Each of these rituals is overseen by the elders of the clan, both men and women. The elders also oversee the community-wide wedding rituals, but an emuron normally plays a role in blessing the marriage.

== Notable people ==
- Ikal Angelei - Winner of Goldman Environmental Prize
- Richard Titus Ekai - Former Kenyan Ambassador to Thailand
- Ekaale Epakan - Human Rights Advocate
- Paul Ereng - 1988 800m Olympic Champion and 800m former indoor world record holder,
- Ekwee Ethuro - Former Speaker of the Senate and former MP for Turkana Central.
- John Kiyonga Munyes - Former Minister of Labour
- Josphat Koli Nanok - Deputy Head of Public Service, First Governor of Turkana County, former MP for Turkana South
- Ajuma Nasenyana - Supermodel

== Gallery ==
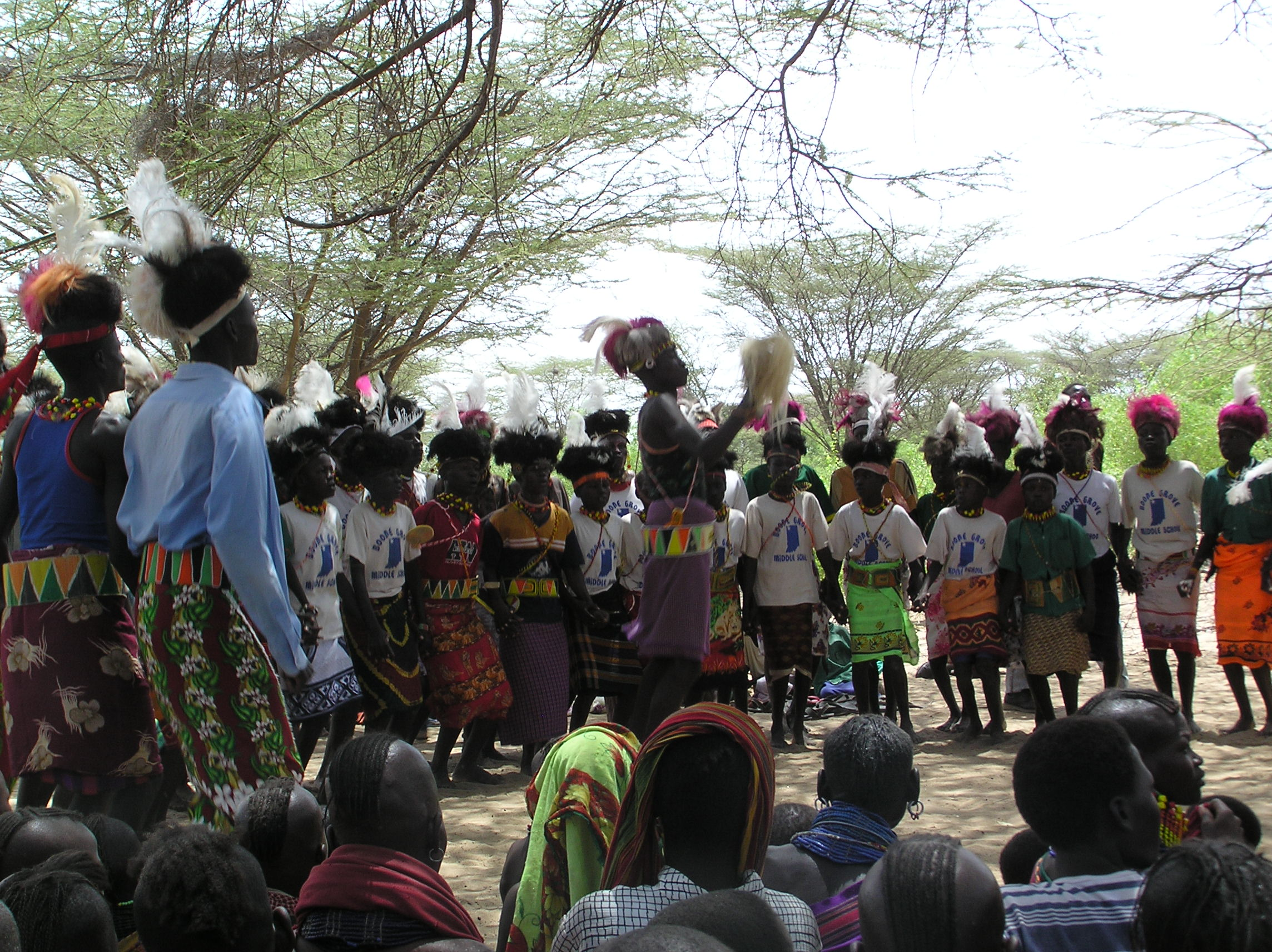
Traditional Turkana dance being presented by local schoolchildren.

Ostrich feather caps are worn as the ceremonial headress.

Woman in everyday Turkana clothing.

Child standing in household garden.

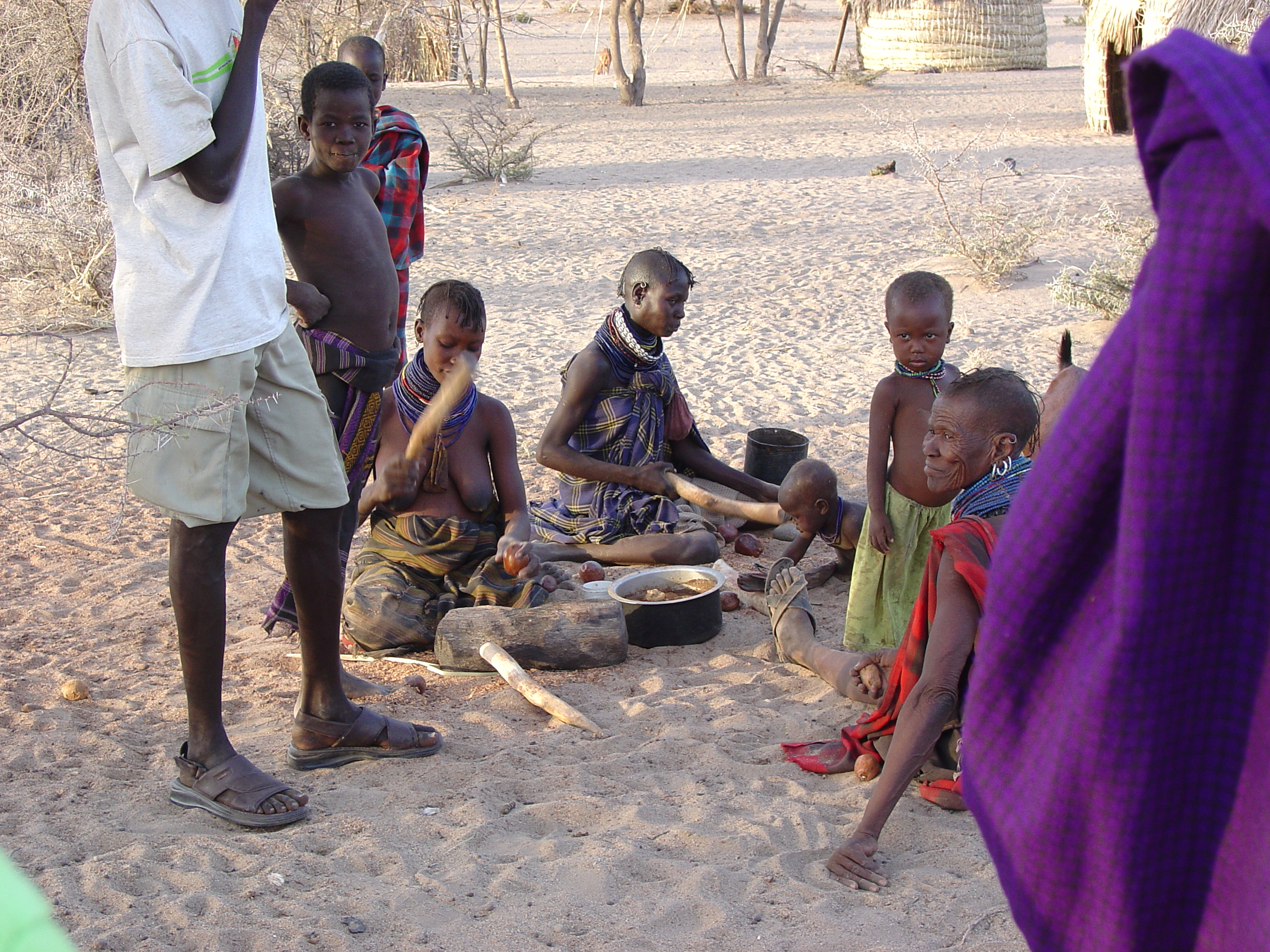
Turkana women pound palm nuts to remove husks. The inner nut is then consumed as food.

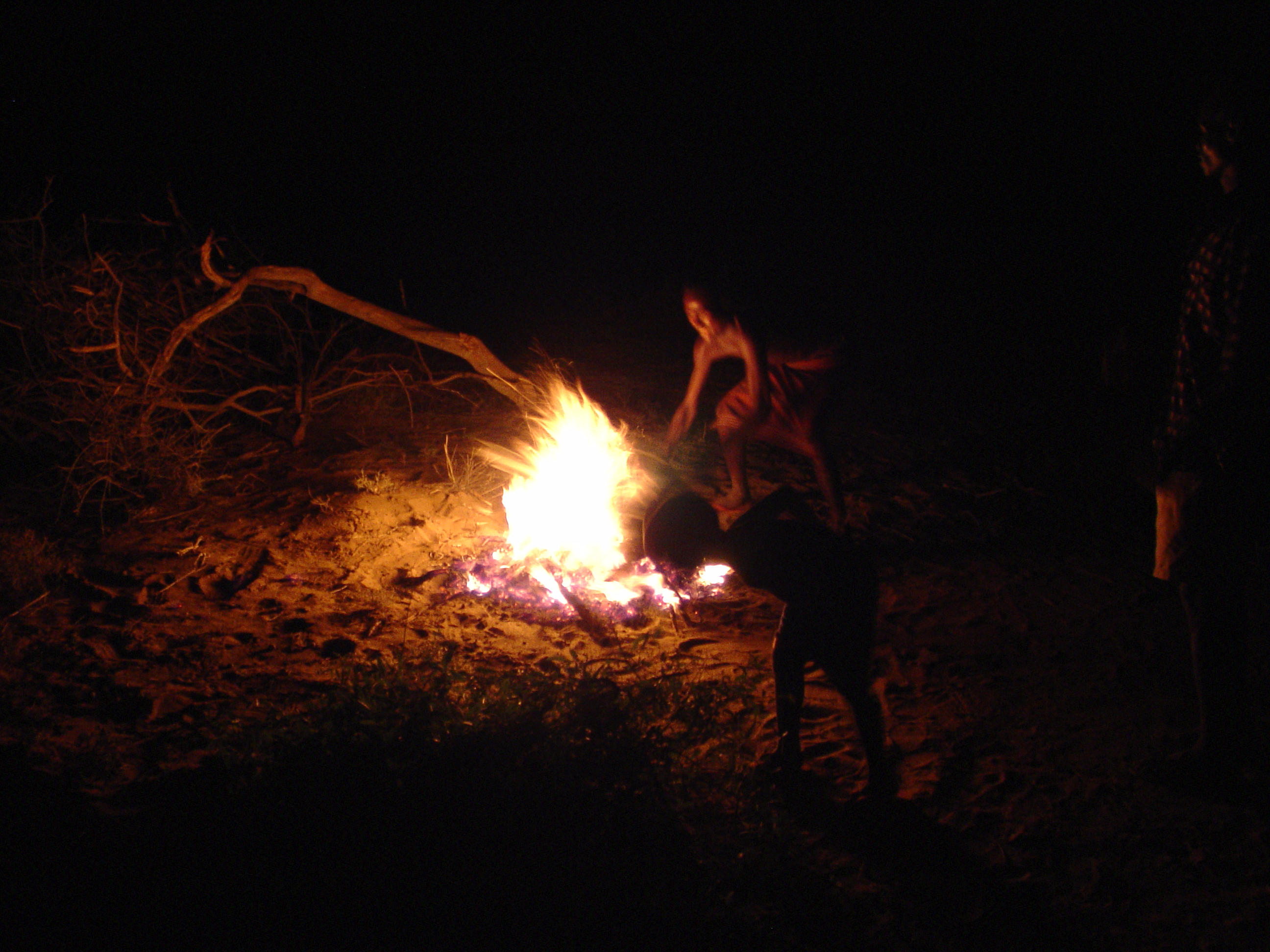
Turkana men roasting a goat as part of a communal dinner.

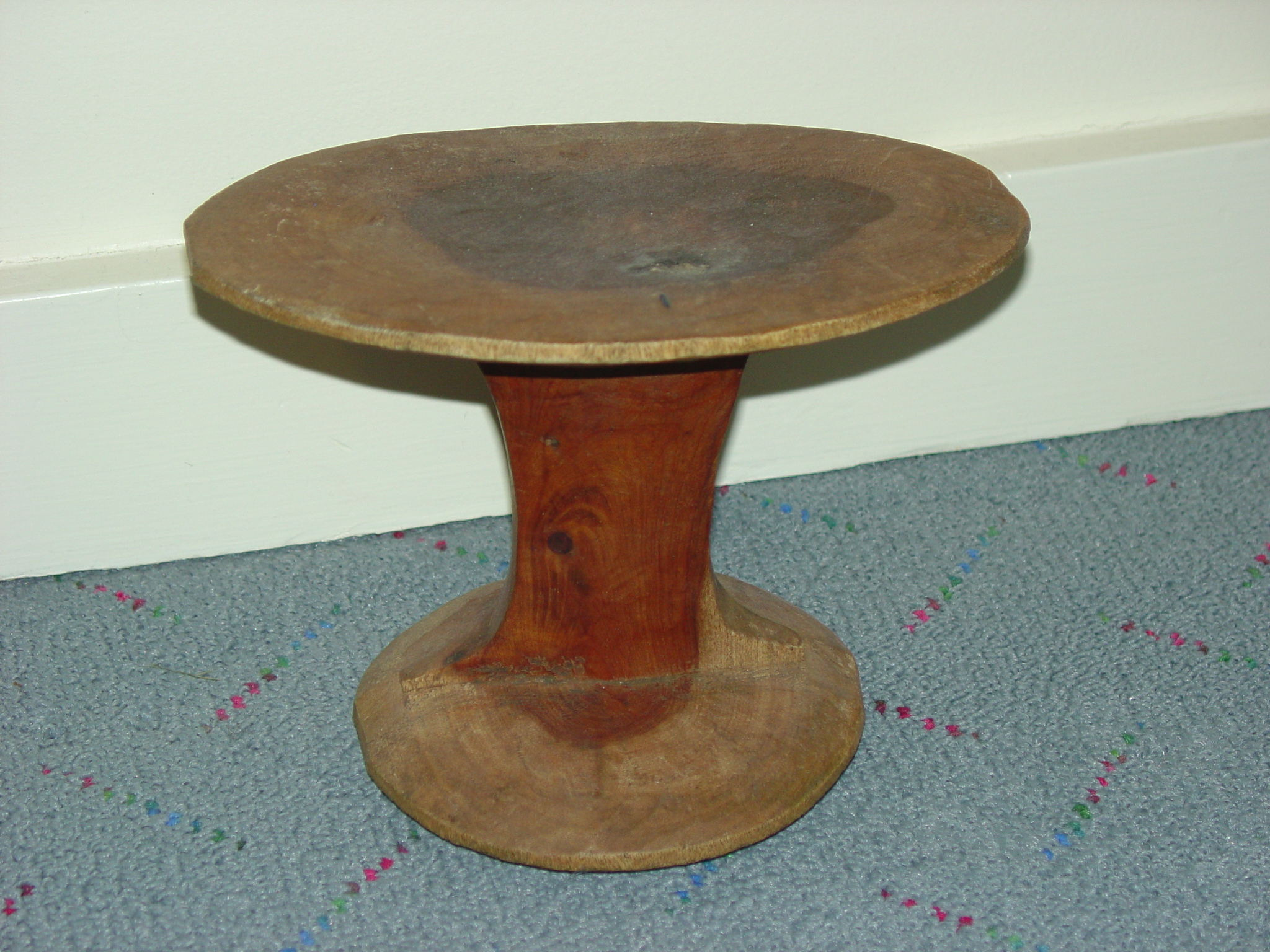
Wooden stool used by Turkana men. Carved from solid wood and conditioned with tobacco juice.

Tightly woven basket produced by the Turkana for everyday use.

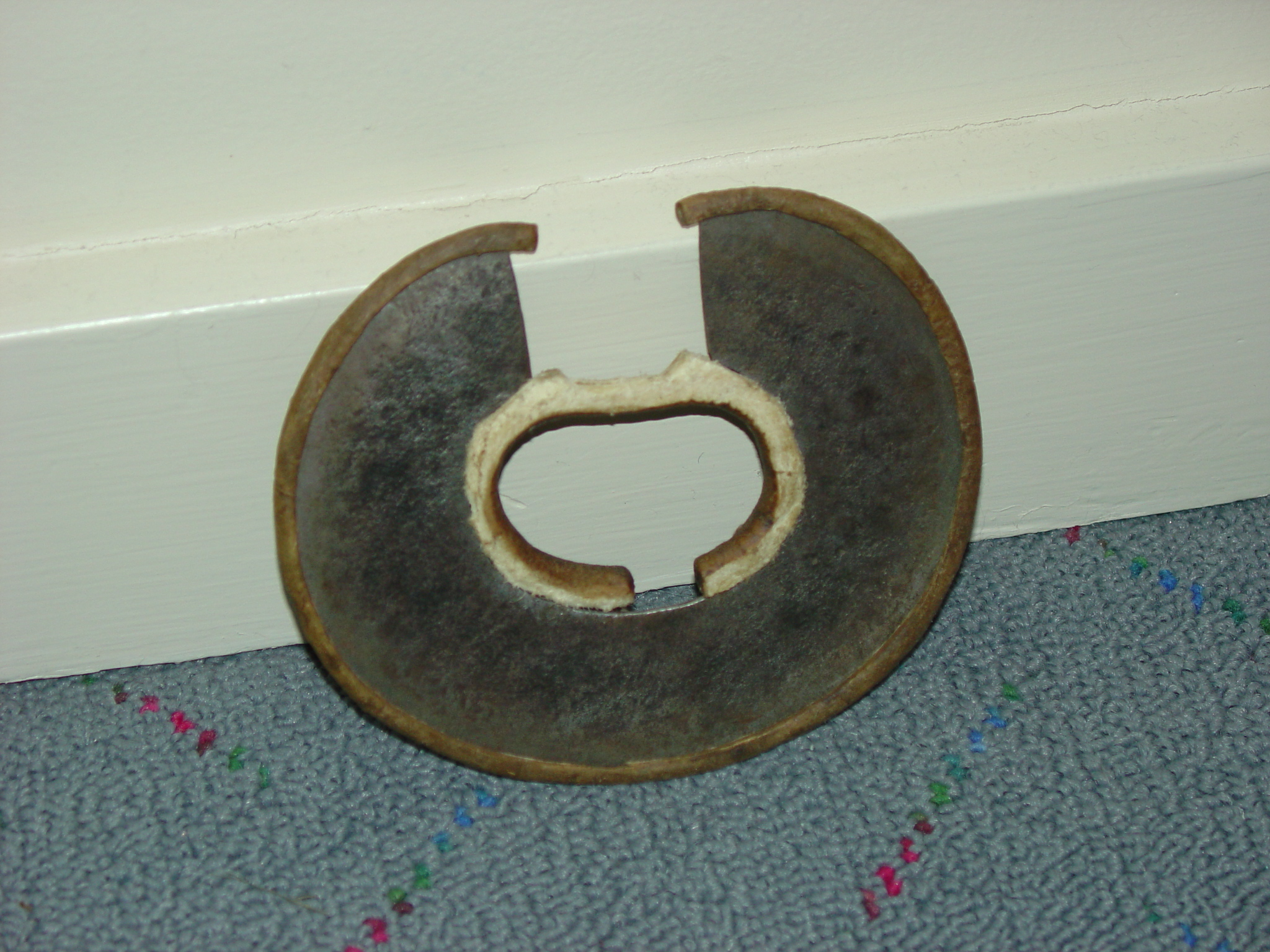
Wristknife worn by Turkana men. It can be used on and off wrist for fighting and utility purposes.

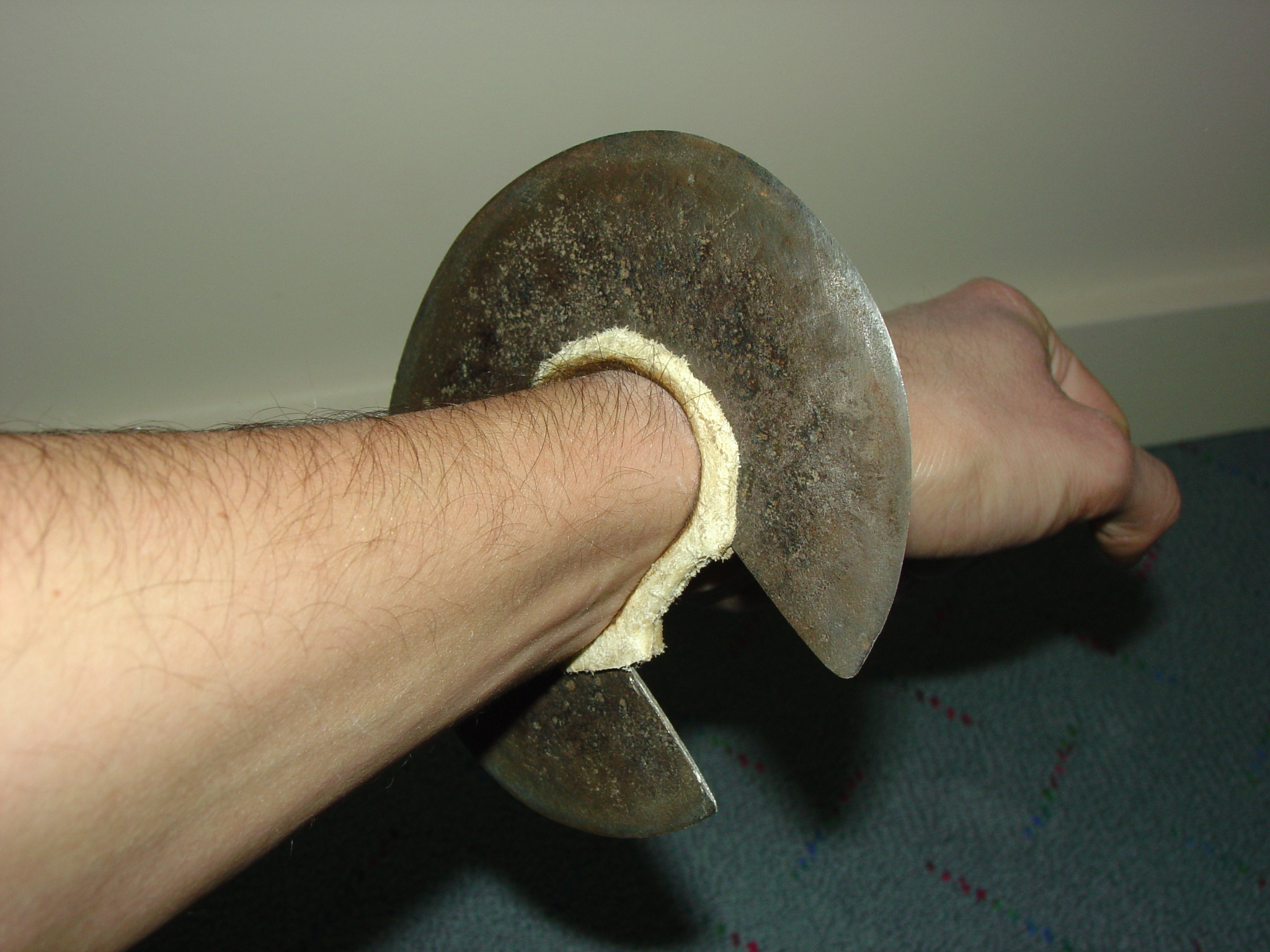
Demonstration of wristknife use.

== See also ==
- Kerio River
- Lake Turkana
- Tobong'u Lore annual festival
- Turkwel River

== Bibliography ==
- Pavitt, Nigel (1997) Turkana. London: Harvill Press. ISBN 1-86046-176-X
- Lamphear, John (1988) 'The people of the grey bull: the origin and expansion of the Turkana', in Journal of African History, 29, 1, 27–39.
