= Nyangatom language =

Nilotic language of Ethiopia

Nyangatom
- Native to: Ethiopia
- Region: Omo River region
- Ethnicity: Nyangatom
- Native speakers: 24,000 (2007 census)
- Language family: Nilo-Saharan?: Eastern Sudanic?; Southern Eastern; Nilotic; Eastern; Ateker–Lotuko–Maa; Ateker; Turkanic; Nyangatom
- Writing system: none

Language codes
- ISO 639-3: nnj
- Glottolog: nyan1315

Nyangatom (also Inyangatom, Donyiro, Dongiro, Idongiro) is a Nilotic language spoken in Ethiopia by the Nyangatom people. It is an oral language only, having no working orthography at present. Related languages include Toposa and Turkana, both of which have a level of mutual intelligibility; Blench (2012) counts it as a dialect of Turkana.

== Phonology ==
=== Vowels ===
| | Front | Back |
|---|---|---|
| Close | i | u |
| Near-close | ɪ | ʊ |
| Close-mid | e | o |
| Open-mid | ɛ | ɔ |
| Open | a | |

- Vowel length is contrastive in Nyangatom, as in dʒík 'completely' vs. dʒíík 'always'
- Before a pause, short vowels carrying a single, simple tone are devoiced.

=== Consonants ===
| | | Labial | Alveolar | Palatal | Velar |
|---|---|---|---|---|---|
| Nasal | | m | n | ɲ | ŋ |
| Plosive/ Affricate | Voiceless | p | t | t͡ʃ | k |
| Plosive/ Affricate | Voiced | b | d | d͡ʒ | ɡ |
| Fricative | | | s | | |
| Flap | | | r | | |
| Approximant | | w | l | j | |

Moges Yigezu, however, analyzes Nyangatom as having implosive stops, rather than voiced egressive stops.

== Bibliography ==
- Dimmendaal, Gerrit J. 2007. "Ñaŋatom language" in Siegbert Uhlig (ed.) Encyclopaedia Aethiopica, Vol 3. Wiesbaden: Harrassowitz. pp. 1131–1132.
