= Dongotona people =

The Dongotono are an ethnic group of South Sudan. They live around the Dongotono Mountains in Eastern Equatoria State of South Sudan. Their main towns are Isoke Payam (mission), Isoke and Ikotos. They speak a variety of the Nilotic Lotuko language, specifically Dongotono. Many of them are Catholic. Their population is over 120,000.
