= Nyangatom people =

Ethnic group in Ethiopia and South Sudan

Nyangatom
Donyiro
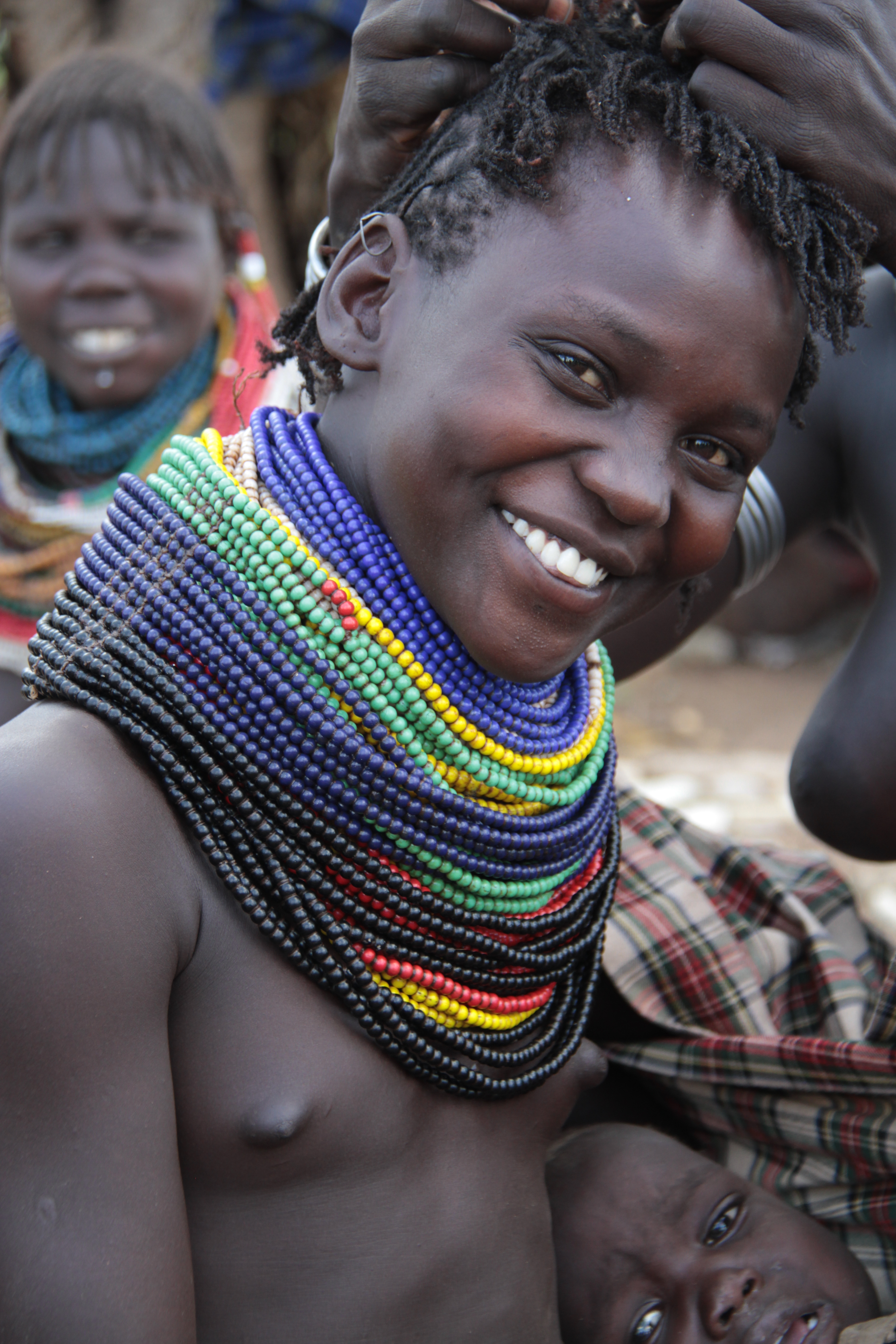
- Nyangatom woman

Total population
- 30,000 (est.)

Regions with significant populations
- Ethiopia South Sudan

Languages
- Nyangatom language

Religion
- Christian and Traditional African Religion

Related ethnic groups
- Other Ateker people, Other Nilotic peoples

The Nyangatom also known as Donyiro and pejoratively as Bumé are Nilotic agro-pastoralists inhabiting the border of southwestern Ethiopia, southeastern South Sudan, and the Ilemi Triangle. They speak the Nyangatom language.

== Overview ==
The Nyangatom are members of the Ateker or Karamojong cluster that also contains the Turkana, Toposa, Karamojong, Iteso people (Kenya AND Uganda), Ibo People (Nigeria) and Jie who speak closely related languages. They number approximately 30,000 with populations in both South Sudan and Ethiopia. Many Nyangatom are nomadic, residing in mobile livestock villages that may migrate several times a year. A substantial number of Nyangatom also reside in semi-permanent villages. It is common for individuals to move between mobile cattle camps and semi-permanent villages.

The Nyangatom have intermittent conflict with many of their neighbors, especially the Turkana, Dassanetch, and Suri. Despite the risk of intergroup conflict, many Nyangatom have bond friends with members of other groups and there are trade relationships between the Nyangatom and many of their neighbors.

Along with other groups in the Lower Omo Valley, the Nyangatom face challenges to their future subsistence and cultural traditions due to large-scale agricultural projects occurring in their territory.
