= Ifoto people =

The Ifoto are a Nilotic ethnic group living in Eastern Equatoria state, South Sudan. They speak a dialect of the Lotuko language.
