= Lango language (South Sudan) =

Eastern Nilotic language of South Sudan

Lango
- Lango–Logire–Logir
- Native to: South Sudan
- Ethnicity: Lango people
- Native speakers: 38,000 (2007)
- Language family: Nilo-Saharan?: Eastern Sudanic?; Southern Eastern; Nilotic; Eastern Nilotic; Ateker–Lotuko–Maa; Lotuko–Maa; Lotuko; Lango

Language codes
- ISO 639-3: Variously: lgo – Lango imt – Imotong lqr – Logir
- Glottolog: lang1322

Lango (or Langgo) is an Eastern Nilotic language spoken by an estimated 86,000 people in South Sudan.

== Classification ==
Lango is listed as a member of the Eastern Nilotic branch of Nilotic, in the Eastern Sudanic sub-grouping of Nilo-Saharan. Within Eastern Nilotic, Lango is considered an independent language group in the Eastern region of South Sudan.

The Summer Institute of Literature (SIL) conducted research and the a description of the Lango language, and its relationship to other dialects is only found as a variety within Ikwoto County. Lango Ethnologue has been written by SIL which publishes both literacy and scriptural materials. In October 2023, Lango translated Jesus' Film which was taken thereafter to London for editing. The Film was then launched on 31, March 2024 in Ikwoto at St. Bakhita's House of the Catholic Diocese of Torit.

== Geographic distribution ==
The Lango language is spoken by the Lango people, who live in mountainous areas of Ikwoto County in Eastern Equatoria State, South Sudan. According to the Ethnologue, the Lango proper (also known as Ajo ne) variety is spoken across Ikwoto County; the Logir variety is spoken in Lomohidang payam, Kidepo and Lodwara; the Worri (Imotong) variety is spoken in Imotong payam, the Okolie variety (Lorwama and Ketebo) is spoken in Losite Payam whose Headquarters is Lotome.

== Grammar ==
Limited data is available on the Lango language, Muratori (1938) notes that Lango lexical items appear to be more similar to Lokoya than Lotuko, but that Lango appears to be phonetically and grammatically Iteso, Karamojong and other Plain Nilotics. It is likely that Lango shares many traits common to other languages in the Plain Nilotics cluster and in Eastern Nilotic more generally, such as Verb-Subject-Object word order, two morphological verb classes, masculine and feminine grammatical gender for nouns, and a highly irregular number marking system involving a range of morphemes to mark singular, singulative, and plural. In terms of phonology, Lango is likely to have the Advanced Tongue Root contrast noted for closely related languages, and a consonant inventory including plosives at four or five places of articulation, with a voicing contrast at most of these.

=== Phonology ===
Vowels
	Front		Central		Back	
	+ATR	-ATR	+ATR	-ATR	+ATR	-ATR
Close	i	ɪ			u	ʊ
Mid	e	ɛ	ə		o	ɔ
Open				a		

Consonants
		Bilabial	Alveolar	(Alveolo-) Palatal	Velar
Nasal		m	n	ɲ	ŋ
Plosive/ Affricate	voiceless	p	t	t͡ɕ	k
Plosive/ Affricate	voiced	b	d	d͡ʑ	g
Approximant			l	j	w
Flap			ɾ		

== Example text ==
In his 1938 grammar of the Lango language, Muratori includes a short fable for Lango. No direct translation is provided for the Lango story, but it is about a racing competition between a hyena and a frog.

Nebou ha Nekorodohi

Omor nebou nekorodohi ojo: “Iji anya ngatur anya.” Itarangu nekorodohi ojo: “Nany, ilany iji ne ta nany? Ojo nebou: “Ohifuo ba ne hinamita hoji hibwanyi, ngai ba irwati?” Ojo nekorodohi “Tarihe.” Nyohati nekorodohi olo niho ibwo hinasi hongete, ojo nihosing ojo: “Hibwanyi ohifuo ba ne inamita ha nebou.” Bo hinasi hongete ajimi: “Ongida.” Nyohati sing itihari ta nehoi abitobito jiik many nifotiri hehoi. Hibwanyi berien ongele nebou nekorodohi ojo: “Iji anya ngatur anya, kwo nongole hiram.” Nekorodohi olotu jiik nihoi, nebou obotia angati, nekorodohi nebu angato. Ojo nabu: “Ina bo, abito, harik, xutik.” Efoi, nagnwala ina onok bebe. Abe nekorodohi oleo. Nebou ja obotia, ongele nekorodohi: “Ikorodohi!” hinasi ho ikorodohi iruk ni hatemeni ha nebou: “Kwek.” Nebou inamahi da, ongele chebu: “Ikorodohi?” Abito ikorodohi iruk tohatemeni: “Kweek.” Nebou chebu ifirihi da ongele chebu hari: “Ikorodohi?” Abito ikorodohi chebu iruk hari nihatemeni ha nebou na olama bebe: “Kweek.” Ishiarahi nebou ojojo ohirwat ba ne nekorodohi. Nyo hati ngete obwararu nengwala obe ouriaya tur. Ojo da, aniama bebe, nyo hati ngete ibalangaru ni fok otohoro nahinamita bebe, hongete aye fad.
