= Turkana language =

Eastern Nilotic language of Kenya and Ethiopia

Turkana
- ŋatùrk(w)anà
- Native to: Kenya, Ethiopia
- Region: Turkana County
- Ethnicity: Turkana
- Native speakers: 990,000 (2009 census)
- Language family: Nilo-Saharan?: Eastern Sudanic?; Southern Eastern?; Nilotic; Eastern; Ateker–Lotuko–Maa; Ateker; Turkana
- Dialects: Northern Turkana; Southern Turkana

Language codes
- ISO 639-3: tuv – Turkana
- Glottolog: turk1308
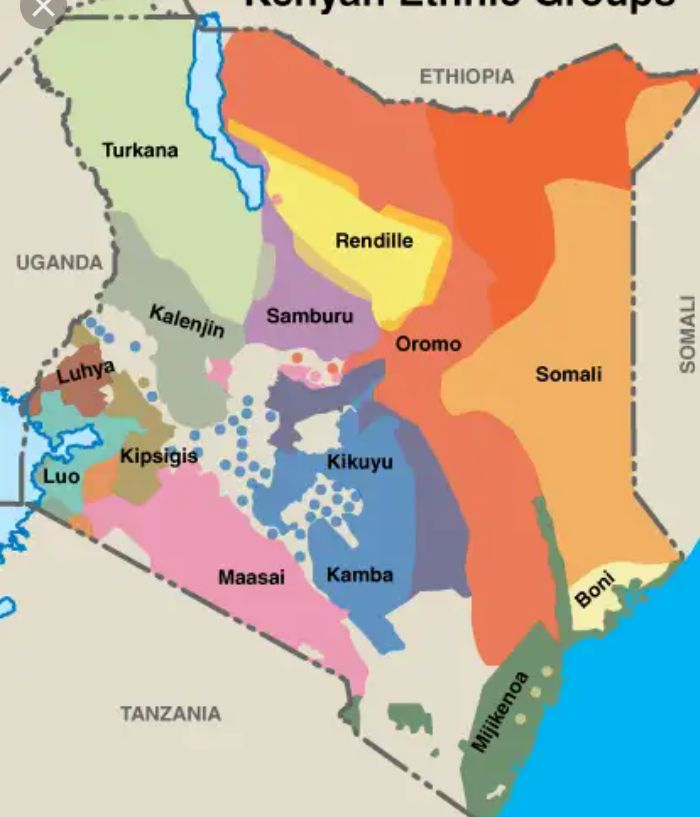
- Linguistic map of Kenya; Turkana is spoken in the light green region.

Turkana /tɜːrˈkɑːnə/ is the language of the Turkana people of Kenya and Ethiopia. It is spoken in northwestern Kenya, primarily in Turkana County, which lies west of Lake Turkana. It is one of the Eastern Nilotic languages, and is closely related to Karamojong, Jie and Teso of Uganda, to Toposa spoken in the extreme southeast of South Sudan, and to Nyangatom in the South Sudan/Ethiopia Omo valley borderland; these languages together form the cluster of Ateker Languages.

The collective group name for these related peoples is Ateker.

== Phonology ==
=== Consonants ===
		Labial	Alveolar	Palatal	Velar
Nasal		m	n	ɲ	ŋ
Plosive/ Affricate	voiceless	p	t	tʃ	k
Plosive/ Affricate	voiced	b	d	dʒ	ɡ
Fricative			s		
Lateral			l		
Trill			r		
Approximant				j	w

- /p/ can also occur as affricated [pɸ] when in syllable-initial positions.
- Affricate sounds /tʃ dʒ/ can also be heard as palatal stops [c ɟ].
- Voiced stops /b d dʒ ɡ/ may also occur glottalized as implosives [ɓ ɗ ʄ ɠ] when in syllable-initial positions. In syllable-final position, they are realized as unreleased.
- /k/ is realized as a uvular stop [q] when occurring in between vowels /a ɔ o/. When it is preceded and followed by back vowels, it is then lenited and heard as the following sounds [χ], [ʁ] or [ʀ].
- /s/ is in free variation with [θ]. These sounds are voiceless at the end of a syllable. When syllable-initial, they are instead voiced, often with a voiceless onset: [sz] or [(θ)ð].
- /ŋ/ is often realized as lengthening of the previous vowel when following /o/ at the end of a word.
- Before voiceless vowels that precede a pause, consonants are de-voiced and plosives are aspirated.

=== Vowels ===
There is a phonemic distinction with voiceless vowels, which only occur word-finally, and which are only realized as voiceless before a pause:

	Front		Central		Back	
	voiced	voiceless	voiced	voiceless	voiced	voiceless
Close	i	i̥			u	u̥
Near-close	ɪ	ɪ̥			ʊ	ʊ̥
Close-mid	e	e̥			o	o̥
Open-mid	ɛ	ɛ̥			ɔ	ɔ̥
Open			a	ḁ		

Turkana features advanced tongue root vowel harmony. The vowels /i e o u/ and their voiceless counterparts are produced with an advanced tongue root, while /ɪ ɛ a ɔ ʊ/ and their voiceless counterparts are produced with a retracted tongue root. The advanced tongue root vowels are usually somewhat breathy in terms of voice. In most circumstances, vowels in any given word must either be all advanced or all retracted in their tongue root position. An exception is made for vowels that come after /a/, which can be either advanced or retracted (while vowels coming before /a/ must be retracted). In parallel to this, vowels following the semivowels /j/ and /w/ can be either advanced or retracted, but vowels preceding them must be advanced. However, the semivowels and /a/ do not affect each other: either may occur before the other, despite conflicting in their tongue root position.

Vowel harmony is usually controlled by the root of a word, so that the vowels of other morphemes assimilate to the root vowels' tongue root position. However, some suffixes are "strong" and instead assimilate the root along with any preceding suffixes. Prefixes are always weak and do not control other vowels. The vowels paired in such assimilations are /i/ vs. /ɪ/, /e/ vs. /ɛ/, /o/ (from earlier /ə/) vs. /a/, /o/ vs. /ɔ/, and /u/ vs. /ʊ/; either element of each pair will turn into the other to match the tongue root position of the controlling morpheme. Vowel harmony does not cross word boundaries, and a phonological word can be defined as a unit across which harmony operates. Vowel harmony is also blocked at the boundary between roots in a compound.

Long vowels occur phonetically, but are best analyzed as sequences of short vowels rather than phonemes in their own right. In roots, /ɔ/ and /ɛ/ may be realized as [wa] and [ja], respectively. High front vowels are deleted between a palatal consonant and another vowel. Voiceless vowels before a pause are lost after glides and nasals (after de-voicing them). Nonhigh voiceless vowels before a pause are furthermore often lost in general.

=== Tone ===
Turkana has two tonemes, high and low, and one or the other is carried by every vowel. Most syllables carry a high tone, so that low tone is more marked. Some tones are "floating" and not carried by a syllable at all. Minimal pairs for tone are rare, and so it is not important in distinguishing words, but it is used to distinguish verb tenses and noun cases, so that it is important in terms of grammar.

== Morphology and syntax ==
Turkana is a verb-initial language with both verb–subject–object (VSO) and verb–object–subject (VOS) as basic, unmarked word orders. The single objects of transitive verbs and both objects of ditransitive verbs are unmarked, while the subject is morphologically marked by a change in tone when present after the verb, and is often omitted entirely. Subjects of intransitive and transitive verbs receive the same case marking. Thus, in terms of morphosyntactic alignment, Turkana is both a marked-nominative language and a double-object language. With ditransitive verbs, the recipient/indirect object is required to be animate, and it always precedes the theme/direct object. Neither object can be promoted to be the subject of a basic sentence, so that Turkana has no real passive construction.

Turkana features six cases: a nominative, an absolute, a genitive, an instrumental, a locative, and a vocative. This makes it typologically unusual as one of the only verb-initial languages attested to have more than two or three cases.

== Vocabulary ==
English	Turkana singular form	Turkana plural form
face	ereet	ngiReetin
body	akwaan	ngaWat
clothes	eworu	ngiWorui
food	akimuj	ngaMuja
tobacco	etaba	ngiTab
goat	akine	ngaKinei
cattle	aite	ngaAtuk
donkey	esikiria	ngiSikiria
camel	ekaal	ngiKaala
water	ngakipi	ngaKipi

== Bibliography ==
- Dimmendaal, Gerrit J. (1983). The Turkana language. Dordrecht: Foris. ISBN 90-70176-83-1.
- Barrett, A. (1988). English–Turkana dictionary. Nairobi: MacMillan Kenya. ISBN 0-333-44577-5.
- Barrett, A. (1990). Turkana–English dictionary. London: MacMillan. ISBN 0-333-53654-1.
