= Teso language =

Eastern Nilotic language of Uganda and Kenya

Teso
- Ateso
- Native to: Uganda, Kenya
- Region: Teso sub-region, parts of Pallisa District and Busia County
- Ethnicity: Iteso
- Native speakers: 2,778,000 (2014 & 2019 censuses)
- Language family: Nilo-Saharan?: Eastern Sudanic?; Kir–Abbaian?; Nilotic; Eastern Nilotic; Ateker–Lotuko–Maa; Ateker; Teso

Language codes
- ISO 639-3: teo
- Glottolog: teso1249

Teso (endonym Ateso) is an Eastern Nilotic language spoken by the Teso people of Uganda and Kenya and some speakers are in South Sudan. It is part of the Teso–Turkana language cluster.

According to the 2012 Uganda population and housing census, over 11.57 million people in Uganda (66.7 percent of the total Uganda population) spoke Ateso. Also, an estimated 279,000 people in Kenya speak the language. Its ISO 639-3 code is teo.

Ateso is spoken in the Teso sub-region. Ateso is also known as Bakedi, Bakidi, Elgumi, Etossio, Ikumama, Iteso, Teso or Wamia. It is closely related to Turkana and Karamojong.

== Phonology ==
=== Consonants ===
| | Labial | Alveolar | Post- alveolar | Palatal | Velar |
|---|---|---|---|---|---|
| Plosive | p b | t d | | c ɟ | k ɡ |
| Fricative | | s | ʃ | | |
| Nasal | m | n | | ɲ | ŋ |
| Lateral | | l | | | |
| Trill | | r | | | |
| Approximant | w | | | j | |

=== Vowels ===
| | +ATR | | | -ATR | | |
| | Front | Central | Back | Front | Central | Back |
|---|---|---|---|---|---|---|
| Close | i | | u | ɪ | | ʊ |
| Mid | e | [ɐ] | o | ɛ | | ɔ |
| Open | | a | | | a | |

- Vowels are phonetically represented with ATR as [i̘, e̘, o̘, u̘, a̘], [ɐ̘] and RTR as [ɪ̙, ɛ̙, ɔ̙, ʊ̙, a̙].
- [ɐ̘] is heard as an allophone of /a/ with advanced tongue root.

Voiceless vowel sounds are present, strictly occurring in word-final position before a pause, at the end of sentences or when standing alone.

| | +ATR | | | -ATR | | |
| | Front | Central | Back | Front | Central | Back |
|---|---|---|---|---|---|---|
| Close | i̥ | | u̥ | ɪ̥ | | ʊ̥ |
| Mid | e̥ | [ɐ̥] | o̥ | ɛ̥ | | ɔ̥ |
| Open | | ḁ | | | ḁ | |

=== Stress ===
The correct pronunciation of these letters when formed into words can only be learned by practice. As a general rule, all syllables should be given equal stress, though the stem or root syllable often carries slightly more stress than other syllables. Stress does not, however, affect the length of the vowel stressed or its pitch or tone. It is equally important to note that syllable pitch plays a vital part in correct pronunciation and that many words, which are spelled identically, have a different meanings according to syllable pitch.

For example:

__ ↗ __ élípì ----- I am praying
___ ___ ‿ elìpǐ ----- I was praying
___ ___ ↗ elipí ----- he/she was praying

== Orthography ==
The spelling used in most of the first published Ateso books is in accordance with the official orthography agreed upon by the Ateso Orthography Committee in 1947. It was then accepted as a general principle that all words should be written in full even though normally contracted in speech. It should be particularly noted that a short -a or -e at the end of a word is dropped in speech when the word is followed by a word beginning with a vowel.

e.g. ekitabo loka etelepat ----- the book of the boy
is pronounced ekitabo lok' etelepat.

Recently, it is evident that the spoken language is continuing to move away from the written language especially in most parts of Uganda. This means that some aspects of orthography may well need revision soon.

While the Iteso of Tororo district in Uganda and Teso district in Kenya retain the letter k in the spoken language, the Iteso in most other areas of Uganda tend to omit it in most of the words.

E.g.

| Ateso in Teso, Kenya & Tororo, Uganda | Ateso in Amuria district, Uganda | English meaning |
|---|---|---|
| Akilip lok'asuban | ailip loasuban | to pray to the creator |
| akinyam emkati/atap | ainyam atap | to eat bread |
| akimat akile | aimat akile | to drink milk |
| akitabu lokalaunan | eitabo loalaunan | a holy book |
| Akote inyamat/inyamen | aimo ainyamat | to look for food |

=== Alphabet ===
There are 22 letters in the Ateso alphabet. The letters f, h, q, v, h, x and z are not used, while the alphabet includes additionally the letter ŋ and digraph ny. The above mentioned letters only appear in loanwords. The pronunciation guides that follow are for practice only; the correct sounds can only be learned by practice from a teacher or an audio media.

There are five vowels in Ateso: a, e, i, o, u. These five letters, however, represent more than five sounds. For the letters E, I, O and U have two values each; a "close" value and an "open" value.

Close vowels are pronounced approximately as follows:

E [e] as in beg (French é): aipet----- to kick
I [i] as in seat: aidip----- to hit
O [o] as in Scottish pronunciation of bone (French eau): aimor----- to insult, to abuse
U [u] as in fool: aikut----- to scratch the earth, to scoop something

Open vowels are pronounced approximately as follows:

E [ɛ] as in beg (French è): aipet ----- to lay out
I [ɪ] as in sit: ailid----- to fasten
O [ɔ] as in gone (or in glory when long): aimor----- to share
U [ʊ] as in full: aikut -----to blow

A [a] is pronounced as in art (never short as in ram)
abal 'to say'

Note that whether the root vowel is "closed" or "open" affects the conjugation of the verb.

Where the vowels AI or OI stand together, they represent sounds approximating the "i" in bite [ai̯] and "oy" [oi̯] in annoy respectively. In other vowel combinations, both vowels must be given their full values. The "au" in kau -----(behind) is pronounced [ka.u] not [kau̯].

All words ending in a consonant possess a semi-mute or "shadow" vowel after the final consonant, which is not pronounced when the word stands in isolation, but which is pronounced when the word is followed by another word beginning with a consonant:

e.g. The Ateso translation of "the women go to the house" is written:

elosete aŋor togo ----- the women are going to the house

but is pronounced: elosete aŋoro Togo

If the word following is normally written as one with the preceding word, the "shadow" vowel is not only pronounced but written:

e.g. elosete aŋoroke togo ----- his women are going to the house

Other examples are given in (vii) below.

There are sixteen consonants and one semi-vowel in Ateso, pronounced approximately as follows:

B [b] as in bat: bobo -----again
C [tʃ] as in chat (never as in cat): elacet ----- key
D [d] as in dog: edou ----- rain
G [ɡ] as in get (never as in geology): agasia rubbish/trash
J [dʒ] as in jam: aijar life
K [k] as in king: ekek door
L [l] as in let: alalau width
M [m] as in mat: mam ----- no
N [n] as in nut: ainu ------ to hug
ŋ^{**} [ŋ] as in hanger (never as in finger): iŋai ----- who
NY [ɲ] as in Spanish Señorita: anya ----- grass (plural)
P [p] as in put: papa ----- father
R [r] as in rat (should be well rolled): erute ----- gate
S [s] as in service : aisab ----- to tell lies
T [t] as in toss: toto ----- mother
y [j] as in yellow: yoga ----- hello

Semi vowel:

W [w] as in win: awasia ----- the end, aiwosa ----- to prosecute

(vi) In words of foreign origin introduced into Teso the missing sound F is replaced by P and the missing sound V by B or P. Z is replaced by S.

Thus mesa -----table (Kiswahili) becomes e-mesa

oku-fuga -----to rule (Luganda) becomes ai-puga

It is an invariable rule that two consonants can never stand together in the same word. Both in speech and in writing. When word construction brings two consonants together, either one of the consonants must be dropped or the "shadow" vowel mentioned in sub-paragraph (iv) above must be inserted between the consonants.

E.g. (Omission of one consonant)

Nen-pe-nen 'just there' is written and pronounced nepenen.

(Insertion of "shadow" vowel)

ŋon-tuŋa-nan 'every man' is written and pronounced: ŋonituŋanan

Elacet-kon 'your key' is written and pronounced elacetekon

^{**}Due to the introduction of typesetting & word processing machines, ŋ is now almost entirely written NG. It is only in old literature that ŋ still appears. The fact that in some works the two letters NG are found together in place of ŋ is no exception to the above rules. These two letters are merely an alternative representation of the sound ŋ, in the same way as the letters NY represent one sound. The semi-vowel W, however, can and frequently does follow a consonant:

aswam work
ekwam air

The Teso language board's alphabet uses NG in place of ŋ, and also uses ɛ, ɨ, ɔ, and ʉ, as well as the modifier letters ⟨ᵃ, ᵉ, ᵋ, ⁱ, ᶤ, ᵒ, ᵓ, ᵘ, ᶶ⟩.

== Gender and noun prefix ==
As with many other languages, Ateso words have grammatical gender. For grammatical purposes all nouns in Ateso are divided into three classes or genders:(a) masculine, (b) feminine and (c) neuter.

=== Noun prefix ===
Every noun in Ateso has a prefix which varies according to the gender of the noun or according to whether the noun is singular or plural. Nouns (in the singular) starting with "E" or "O" are usually masculine. Those starting with "A" are feminine while those that start with "I" are neuter. See table below for details.

| | masculine | feminine | neuter |
|---|---|---|---|
| singular | e, o | a | i |
| plural | i, o | a | i |
| e.g. | etelepat → itelepai boy {} boys | apese → apesur girl {} girls | ikoku → idwe child {} children |

The only exception to the above rule are certain nouns denoting relationships and directions.
e.g. toto ----- mother; papa ----- father; mamai ----- uncle; inac ----- sister; ija ----- aunt

kide ----- east; too ----- west; ŋalakimak (or agolitomei) ----- south; nyakoi ----- north

It should, however, be noted that the noun prefix is always dropped when the noun comes after the following pronouns or adjectives and their feminine, neuter or plural forms:

| pronoun or adjective | examples |
|---|---|
| ece, ace, ice – other, another; ngol (m) or ngin (f, n) – every edio (m), adio (f), idio (n) – any, some ediope (m), adiope (f) – one | ecetunganan – another man; aceberu – another woman; icetunganan -another person; icetunga -other people etunganan – a man; ngolitunganan (or nginitunganan) -every man; aberu – a woman; nginiberu – every woman ediotunganan -any man; adiopese -any girl; idiokoku – any child adiopeberu – one woman; ediope kiliokit bon -only one man |

The following is a general classification of most nouns.

=== Masculine nouns ===
The masculine nouns are:

(i) Names of male beings:
e.g. ekingok – dog

ekoroi ----- he-goat
emong ----- bull
etelepat/esapat ----- boy
Ekue ----—fox
Ekokor ----—cock

(ii) Names of most trees and fruit
e.g. eloa* – mvule tree (* now generally referred to as emapule )

enimu ----— lemon
etaget ----— banana
emucuuga ----— an orange

(iii) Names of insects:
e.g. esirut – mosquito

emukuny ----— black ant
ekonyelet ----— beetle
ecwarenit ----— bed-bug
eidepit ----—flea

(iv) Names of non-indigenous liquids:
e.g. ecaai ----— tea

akaawa** ----— coffee (** derived from the Arabic word qahwa)
ebia ----— beer
ebino** ----— wine (** ewain is also accepted )

=== Feminine nouns ===
The feminine nouns are:

(i) Names of female beings:
e.g. akingok – bitch

akinei ----— she-goat
apese ----— girl
Akokor ----—hen

(ii) Names of languages and countries:
e.g. Ateso ----— the Teso language

Amusugun ----— the English language
Alulatin ----— the Latin Language
Amugana ----—The Ganda language (or Ganda women)

(iii) Names of indigenous liquids:
e.g. ajon ----—local cereal brew

akipi ----— water
akile ----— milk
acece ----—soup
akima ----—porridge (also akuma)

(iv) Abstract nouns:-
e.g. ajokus----—goodness (*also ajokis, ajokisu are used depending on the area)

amina ----- love
aojau ----—height
alalau ----—width
ajijim ----—tastiness
apianis ----—tastelessness
anyunyura ----—anger

(v) Verbs used as nouns:

e.g. alosit ----- going
abunere ----- coming
aisiom ----- reading
aisom ----- jumping

=== Neuter nouns ===
The neuter nouns are:

(i) Names of neuter or generic objects:
e.g. ituŋanan ----- person (sex unknown)

irotin ----- roads/ways

(ii) Names of diminutive objects:
e.g. ikiŋok ----- puppy

ipese ----- baby girl
Imoru ----- pebble
imiot ----- chick
imukeru ----- baby

=== Plural ===
(i) To form the plural the ending of the noun is changed. This change may consist of the omission of the last syllable, the addition of another syllable or syllables, or the alteration of the last syllable or syllables:

| Plural formation | Example | |
|---|---|---|
| omission | amukat → amuk shoe {} shoes | atipet → atipe bead {} beads |
| addition | akan → akanin hand {} hands | akwap → akwapin country {} countries |
| alteration | apese → apesur girl {} girls | ekek → ikekia door {} doors |

(ii) In the case of masculine nouns the noun prefix also changes as shown in the table on noun prefix above.

(iii) These changes in the endings of nouns are so irregular that it is not worthwhile trying to formulate rules for the formation of plurals.

(iv) Certain nouns, however, which are derived from verbs, form their plurals according to rules;

(a) Nouns denoting an agent of action (a person who does the action of the verb) form a singular ending in -an or -on and a plural ending in -ak or -ok:

| ekamejan → ikamejak hunter {} hunters | ekecokon → ikecokok herdsman {} herdsmen |
| ekadukon → ikadukok {a builder} {} builders | ekatubon → ikatubok judge {} judges |

(b) Nouns denoting something which does or, is done, form a singular ending in -et or -etait and a plural ending in -eta:

| elacet → ilaceta key {} keys | arapetait → arapeta cover {} covers |

(v) Some nouns have no singular and exist only in the plural:
e.g. akipi—-water; ajony – local brew; asinge – sand; ajo – sleep; ileic – shame

Other nouns have no plural and exist only in the singular;
e.g. ekuron – ashes; akoloŋ—sun; adam – brain; eduan – weeds

(vi) Abstract nouns and names of diseases, as in English, have no plural.
e.g. aiyalama -happiness; amin -love.

(vii) Some nouns form their plural from other roots:

| aberu → aŋor woman {} women | ikoku → iduwe child {} children |

(viii) Some nouns, in addition to the normal plural, form a generic plural by adding -sinei to the plural form:

| etuŋanan → ituŋa → ituŋasinei man {} men {} mankind | akwap → akwapin → akwapisinei country {} countries {} {the world (n dropped for euphony)} |

== Article ==
There is no definite or indefinite article in Teso. Aberu means "a woman" or "the woman" according to the context.

== Adverbs ==
Adverbs clarify the action of a verb.Interrogative adverbs usually follow the verb they qualify.

e.g. Elosit nesi ai? where did he go?

But if the interrogative adverb is strengthened by the particle BO, the adverb must precede the verb

e.g. aibo ejaas itelepai ? (Where are the boys?) =ejaas itelepai ai?, but all the other adverbs follow the verb.

=== Adverbs of place ===
Ai/aibo= where?
nen =there (not far off)

e.g. aibo ejai eka'kalaamu? Where is my pencil?; Ejai nen = it's there.

Ngina = over there (at a distance)

e.g. Aibo ejai toto? Where is mom; Ejai ngina = (she's) over there.

Lailo, laije =this way, that way.

e.g. Kobia lailo, mam ilosi ngina =come this way, don't go there; Kobongo laije, mam ibuni lailo = Go back there, don't come this way.

Juwai/Juwayi = at the back of / that way/that side (usually behind something)

e.g. Elosit papa juwai =Dad has gone to the other side / Dad has gone to the rear

Ajesan = down there.

e.g. Aeka je ajesan =He's gone down there

Nelwana/ne alwanan =far off

e.g. Alot onac ameja nelwana = (my) brother has gone hunting in a far place

Eyapye/eyapiei/eyapie = near

e.g.Eyapie ne elosit ngesi = he/she has gone nearby (to a near place)

Toma =inside

e.g. Ejai amunyu toma ocupa = the salt is inside the bottle;Eroko Yakobo ejai toma agoola ke = James is still inside his room

Kiding =in the middle/between

e.g. Ejai eyapesi ka kiding na eiduka kede ekanisa = my office is between the shop and the church;Ibirokina ekitoi kiding na erot = the tree has fallen in the middle of the road

Kau = behind
Ngaren (na) = in front (of)

e.g. Ngaren na ataker = In front of the boat

Osiep = near/on the side of/beside

e.g. Ikunyu ber ijo osiep ka = Please come near me (move closer)

Diye = very close

e.g. Anu inyo ilosia ijo diye do abongun kede akan? = Why did you go nearby and return empty-handed?

teten = (to the) right

e.g. Ibelokin teten = turn to the right

Kediany = left

e.g. Ejaasi kesi kediany = They're on the left (hand side)

Kide = East
Too = West
Nyakoi = North
Agolitomei / Ongalakimak = South

== Vocabulary ==
Hello – yoga
How are you? – Ijai biai (singular), Ijaasi biai (plural)
Fine, and you? – Ejokuna, arai ijo?
Fine – ejokuna
What is your name? – Ingai bo ekon'kiror?
My name is ... – Eka'kiror ...
Name --- Ekiror
Nice to see you. --- Eyalama ewanyun (also: Eyalama aanyun)
See you again --- Awanyunos bobo
Book – Eitabo
Because – Naarai

The first sentence in the bible can be translated as Ageunet, abu Edeke Kosub akwap keda akuj ("In the beginning God made the earth and the heavens" lit. "the down and the up").

=== Numerals ===
Ateso numerals are from ones place to hundredth place. Numerals upwards from one thousand are borrowed from other languages.

(i) Numbers from one to five are the basis of the whole numerical system in Ateso. Six (6) is literally translated as 5+1 (five and one), 7 as 5+2 (five and two), etc. In the same way 16 is 10+5+1, 17 is 10+5+2, 21 is 20+1, 26 is also 20+5+1, etc.

(ii) Numerals agree in gender with the noun they define:
e.g. itelepai iuni three boys, ikekia iuni three doors, imeesan iuni three tables

apesur auni three girls, aturo auni three flowers, iduwe iuni three children

(iii) Numerals always follow the noun. ediope (one) can however, precede, in which case the noun prefix is dropped.
e.g. edioperot (or erot ediope) one road/way; adiopeberu one woman;

angor auni three women, irotin iuni three roads/ways

^{††}The word for zero, esupur, is no longer used in the spoken language. Instead enoot, a loanword derived from the English naught is generally used.

==== Cardinal numbers ====
| Numeral | Masculine | Feminine | Neuter |
|---|---|---|---|
| 1 | Idiope(t) | adiope(t) | yenisodit |
| 2 | iyarei | aarei | as in masculine |
| 3 | iuni | auni | " |
| 4 | ioŋon | aoŋon | " |
| 5 | ikany | akany | " |
| 6 | ikany-kape | akany-kape | " |
| 7 | ikany-kaare | akany-kaare | " |
| 8 | ikanykauni | akany-kauni | " |
| 9 | Eikanykaoŋon | akanyaaŋon | " |
| 10 | itomon | atomon | " |
| 11 | itomon-kanu-diope | atomon-kanu-diope | " |
| 12 | itomon'aare | atomon'aare | " |
| 13 | itomon'auni | atomon'auni | " |
| 14 | itomon'aaŋon | atomon'aaŋon | " |
| 15 | itomon'akany | atomon'aakany | " |
| 16 | itomon akany'kape | atomon akany'kape | " |
| 17 | itomon akany'kaare | atomon akany'kaare | " |
| 18 | itomon akanyauni | atomon akanyauni | " |
| 19 | itomon akany aoŋon | atomon akany aoŋon | " |
| 20 | akais aare | as in masculine | " |
| 21 | akais aarei kanudiope | " | " |
| 30 | akais auni | " | " |
| 40 | akais aangon | " | " |
| 50 | akais akany | " | " |
| 60 | akais akany kapei | " | " |
| 100 | akwatat (adiope) | " | " |
| 101 | akwatat kanu diope | " | " |
| 200 | akwat aarei | " | " |
| 500 | akwat akany | " | " |
| 1,000 | elukumit ediope | " | " |
| 10,000 | ilukumin itomon | " | " |
| 1,000,000 | emilionit ediope | " | " |
| 100,000,000 | imilionin akwatat | " | " |

==== Ordinal numbers ====
Ordinal numbers are formed from cardinal numbers by prefixing the relative forms lok- (m), nak- (f), yenik-(n) as appropriate, to the masculine form of the numeral and by adding -et after the numeral.
e.g. akany five, nakikanyet fifth (feminine singular)

iuni three, lokiuniet third (masculine singular)
iyarei two, yenikiyareit second (neuter singular)

| No. | Masculine | Feminine | Neuter |
|---|---|---|---|
| 1st | losodit | nasodit | yenisodit |
| 2nd | lokiareit | nakiyareit | yenikiyareit |
| 3rd | louniet | nauniet | yeniuniet |
| 4th | lowoŋonet | nawoŋonet | yeniwoŋonet |
| 5th | loikanyet | naikanyet | yenikanyet |
| 6th | loikanyet ape | naikanyet ape | yenikanyet ape |
| 7th | loikanyetaare | naikanyetaare | yenikanyetaare |
| 8th | loikanyetauni | naukanyetauni | yenikanyetauni |
| 9th | loikanyetaaŋonet | naikanyetaaŋonet | yenikanyetaaŋonet |
| 10th | loitomonet | naitomonet | yenitomonet |
| 11th | loitomonetadipe | naitomonet adiope | yenitomonetadiope |
| 50th | loakaisakany | nakaisakany | yenakaisakany |
| 100th | loakwatat | naakwatat | yenakwatat |
| last | lo agolon | nagolon | yenagolon |

‡ a majority of Iteso (especially those in the Ugandan districts of Soroti, Kumi, Amuria, Bukedea, Serere_District and Kaberamaido) do not pronounce some ks in speech.

Thus, nakikanyet is pronounced naikanyet, etc.

=== Loanwords ===
Ateso has taken a number of loanwords, primarily from English and Swahili languages.

Words marked with an asterisk (*) indicates that the last letter in the Ateso word is silent.

| English | Ateso |
|---|---|
| Car | Emotoka |
| Television | Etelevision |
| Radio | Eredio |
| Fax Machine | Afakis Mashin |
| E-mail | E-emeilo* |
| Internet | E-intanet |
| Computer | Akompiuta |
| Telephone† | Esimu* |
| Record Player | Arekod puleya |
| CD Player | Asidi puleya |
| DVD player | Adividi puleya |
| disc | Adisiki* |

†The Ateso word for a telephone that most Ateso speakers are familiar with is the word "Esimu" which comes from Luganda.
