= Imatong people =

Total population
- 16,000

Languages
- Lotuko

Religion
- Christianity

Related ethnic groups
- Lotuko, Lango, Acholi, Ifoto

The Imatong or Horiyok are a Nilotic ethnic group living in Eastern Equatoria state, South Sudan. They speak a dialect of the Lotuko language.
