= Eastern Nilotic languages =

Subgroup of the Nilotic language family

Eastern Nilotic
- Geographic distribution: southwestern Ethiopia, eastern South Sudan, northeastern Uganda, western Kenya, northern Tanzania
- Linguistic classification: Nilo-Saharan?: Eastern Sudanic; Southern Eastern; Nilotic; Eastern Nilotic
- Subdivisions: Bari; Ateker–Lotuko–Maa

Language codes
- Glottolog: east2418

The Eastern Nilotic languages are one of the three primary branches of the Nilotic languages, themselves belonging to the Eastern Sudanic subfamily of Nilo-Saharan; they are believed to have begun to diverge about 3,000 years ago, and have spread southwards from an original home in Equatoria in South Sudan. They are spoken across a large area in East Africa, ranging from Equatoria to the highlands of Tanzania. Their speakers are mostly cattle herders living in semi-arid or arid plains.

== Classification ==
According to Vossen (1982), the Eastern Nilotic languages are basically classified as follows by the comparative method. Vossen (1982) also provides a reconstruction of Proto-Eastern Nilotic.

- Eastern Nilotic
  - Bari languages
  - Teso–Lotuko–Maa:
    - Teso–Turkana (or Ateker; incl. Karimojong)
    - Lotuko–Maa:
      - Lotuko languages
        - Lango language
        - Lopit language
        - Lokoya language
        - Lotuko language
        - Dongotono language
      - Ongamo–Maa
        - Ongamo language
        - Maa languages
          - Maasai language (see also Mukogodo-Maasai)
          - Camus language
          - Samburu language (see also Elmolo-Samburu)

It is generally agreed upon that Bari forms a primary branch, but lower-level splits are less clear.

=== Swadesh approach (Vossen 1982) ===
Vossen's classification using the Swadesh approach is as follows (Vossen 1982:114).

- Eastern Nilotic
  - Bari languages
    - Mondari
    - Kakwa
    - Nyanggwara
    - Kuku
    - Pöjulu
    - Ngyepu
    - Bari
  - Lotuko–Maa languages
    - Lotuko languages
      - Lopit, Dongotono
      - Lotuko, Lokoya
    - Ongamo–Maa languages
      - Ongamo
        - Maasai
          - Camus, Samburu
  - Teso–Turkana languages
    - Teso
      - Nyangatom
        - Turkana, Karimojong

=== Gleason approach (Vossen 1982) ===
Vossen's classification using the Gleason approach is as follows (Vossen 1982:119).

- Eastern Nilotic
  - Bari languages
    - Kuku, Ngyepu
    - Pöjulu
    - Kakwa
    - Bari
    - Nyanggwara, Mondari
  - Lotuko languages
    - Lopit, Dongotono
    - Lotuko, Lokoya
  - Teso–Turkana languages
    - Nyangatom
      - Teso
        - Turkana, Karimojong
    - Ongamo–Maa languages
      - Ongamo
        - Maasai
          - Camus, Samburu

== Gender Marking ==
Gender marking through prefixes (or proclitics) on nouns is an innovation in the Eastern Nilotic languages that is not found in the other branches of Nilotic. However, not every Eastern Nilotic language has this feature: for example, Bari does not have it.

Noun Gender Prefixes/Proclitics in Eastern Nilotic Languages
		Lopit	Otuho	Maa	Ateso	Turkana	Bari
Singular	Feminine	(ɪ-, na-)	a-, ne-	ɛn-	a-	a-	-
Singular	Masculine	(lɔ-)	o-, lo-, la-	ɔl-	e-	e-	-
Singular	Neuter	-	-	-	i-	i-	-
Plural	Feminine	(ɪ-, na-)	a-, ne-	ɪn-	ŋa-	ŋa-	-
Plural	Masculine	(lɔ-)	o-, lo-, la-	ɪl-	ŋi-	ŋi-	-
Plural	Neuter	-	-	-	ŋi-	ŋi-	-

== Comparative vocabulary ==
Sample basic vocabulary of Eastern Nilotic languages from Vossen (1982):

Language	eye	ear	nose	tooth	tongue	mouth	blood	bone	tree	water	to eat	name
Proto-Eastern Nilotic	*-k₃ɔŋ- / *-k₃ɔɲ-		*-ku-me / *-ku-me-t₂ik	*-k₃ela-	*-ŋa-dʸɛp- / *-ŋa-dʸɛp-a	*-k₁ʊ-t₁ʊk-	*-(a)k₃ɔt	*-k₃oyV-t₁-	*-tʸani	*-pi-	*-ɲa(m)-	*-k₃a-rɪn-
Teso	a-kɔ́ŋ-ʊ̀	á-kí-t	e-kúmè	e-kíàl-àì	á-ŋǎjɛ̀p	á-kɪ̀tʊ̀k	á-àkɔ́t	á-kóì-t	ɛ́-kɪ́tɔ́-ɪ̀	a-ki-pí	akí-ɲám-à	é-kɪ́-rɔ́-rɪ̀
Turkana	á-kɔŋ-ʊ	á-kí-t	é-kume	ɛ́-kɛl-aɪ	a-ŋajɛp	a-kʊtuk	ŋá-akɔt	á-koí-t	ɛ-kɪtɔ-ɛ	ŋá-kɪpɪ	akɪ-ɲam	ɛ́-kɪ-rɔ
Nyangatom	-kɔɲaːn	gɪ-t̪e	-kume	n-kɛl	-ŋajɛb	-kutʊːk	-qɔt	ŋ-qöy-ɔ	ŋa-kitɔ	ŋá-kɪ́-pì	tɛ-nɛm	-kurɔː
Karimojong	a-kɔŋ-u	a-ki-t	é-kùmé	ɛ́-qɛ̀l-áe	a-ŋadyɛ́p	a-kit̪uk	ŋa-akɔɔt	á-qɔ̀ɪ́-t	ɛ-kitɔ-ɪ	ŋa-ki-piʔ	aki-ɲam	e-ke-ro
Maasai	ɛŋ-kɔŋ-ʊ́	ɛŋ-kɪ-ɔɔk	eŋ-kumé	ɔl-alá-ɪ̀	ɔl-ŋɛ́jɛ́p	ɛŋ-kʊ́tʊ́k	ɔ-sárɠɛ́	ol-óì-tò	ɔl-caní	ɛŋ-kár-ɛ́	a-ɲá	ɛŋ-kárn-á
Camus	ŋ-kɔŋ-ʊ́	ŋ-ké-ok	ŋ-kawar-íé	l-alá-ɪ̀	l-ŋɛjɛp	ŋ-kʊtʊ́k	l-ɔɗɔ́	l-óì-tò	l-caní	ŋ-kár-ɛ́	a-ɲá	ŋ-kárn-á
Sampur	ŋ-kɔŋ-ʊ́	ŋ-kɪ́-yyɔk	ŋ-kwar-íé	l-alá-ɪ̀	l-ŋɛ́jɛ́p	ŋ-kʊtʊ́k	l-ɔɗɔ́	l-óì-tò	l-caní	ŋ-kár-ɛ́	a-ɲá	ŋ-kárn-á
Ongamo	na-hɔŋ-ʊ́	na-ʃɔ́ɔ	ʃaɽ-íé	ɔ-háa-ɪ	ɔ-ŋɛ́jɛ́β-ɪ́	na-kutók	na-hɔ́ɔ́t-ʊ́	o-hóí-to	ɔ-ʃɛtá	na-si-βí	-am-/ɲ-	na-hárn-á
Lotuko	ɔ́ɲ-ɛ̀k	é-yyòk	á-ttàrɪ̀	álà-ɪ̀	ɔ́ŋàjɛ̀p	ɛ́-ðùk	ɔ́-ɔ̀ðɔ̀	a-xó-tìò	á-yyànì	á-àr-è	á-ŋíyó	á-fùrè
Oxoriok	a-xɔɲ-ɛk	e-yok	a-xar-iɛ	ɔ-xala-i	u-ŋadiep	a-xutuk	a-xɔtɔ	o-xoi-toŋ	o-xyani	a-xar-ɛ	ɲo	o-furɛ
Lopit	xɔɲ-ɛk	hí-yók	hi-mó	xalá-tì	ŋájɛ́p	xʊ́tʊ́k	xɔ́tɔ́	xoɪ́t-òì	yyánì	hi-ɸí-òŋ	dáxá	ɸúré
Dongotono	xɔɲ-ɛk	cyɔ̂k	hí-mè	xalá-tɪ̀	ŋádɛ́p	xʊ́tʊ́k	ɔ-xɔ́t-ɔ́	xoít-ò	sánì	xár-ɪ́	ɔ-dɔŋɔ́	ɸúrè-ì
Lokoya	a-ɣɔɲ-ɛk	e-xi-yôk	o-xi-môŋ	o-ɣalá-í	ʊ-ŋájɪ́p	a-kʊ́tʊ́k	a-ɣɔ́tɔ́	ɔ-ɣɔ́t-ɔ̀ŋ	ó-yán-dɪ́k	a-ɣar-ɛ	a-ɲû	o-vúré
Bari	kɔŋ-ɛ́	súö̀-t	kúmé	kélê	ŋɛ́dɛ́p	kʊ́tʊ́k	rɪ́mà	kuyú-tìò	kódíní	pí-òŋ	ɲésù	karɛ́n
Kakwa	kɔɲ-ɛ́	súè	kúmé	kálá	ɲɛ́dɛ́p	kʊ́tʊ́	rɪ́mà	kʊ́yʊ́	kodiŋí	píò	ɲósù	karɛ́n
Kuku	kɔ́ŋ-ɛ́	súö̀-t	kumé	kölö́-ì	ŋɛ́dɛ́p	kʊ́tʊ́k	ɓíyèt	kú(y)ú-tö̀n	ködin-î	pí-òŋ	yésù	karɪ́n
Ngyepu	kɔŋ-ɛ́	súö̀-t	kumé	kölö́-ì	ŋyɛ́dɛ́p	kútúk	rɪ́mà	kuyú-tyò	ködin-í	pí-òŋ	ɲésu	karɛ́n
Pöjulu	kɔŋ-ɪ́n	súö̀-t	kumé	kelê	ŋyɛ́dɛ́p	kutúk	rɪ́mà	kuí-sò	ködin-í	pí-òŋ	ɲésù	karɛ́n
Nyanggwara	kɔŋ-ɛ́	ʃwö́-t	kumé	kelé	ŋɛ́dɛ́p	kʊ́tʊ́k	rɪ́mà	kuyú-tío	ködin-í	pí-òŋ	ɲésù	karɛ́n
Mondari	kɔŋ-ɛ́	sʊ́-t	kʊmɪ́	kɛlɛ́	ŋɛ́dɛ́p	kʊ́tʊ́k	rɪ́mà	kú-cö̀	ködí	ci-pí	ɲö́sút	karɛ́n

== See also ==
- Languages of Tanzania
- Languages of South Sudan
- Serengeti-Dorobo language, of which at least the numeral system is Eastern or Southern Nilotic
- List of Proto-Eastern Nilotic reconstructions (Wiktionary)

== Bibliography ==
- Vossen, Rainer. 1982. The Eastern Nilotes: Linguistic and Historical Reconstructions. Berlin: Dietrich Reimer Verlag. ISBN 3-496-00698-6.
