= Teso–Turkana languages =

Teso–Turkana
- Ateker
- Geographic distribution: southeastern South Sudan, northeastern Uganda, northwestern Kenya, southwestern Ethiopia
- Linguistic classification: Nilo-Saharan?: Eastern Sudanic?; Southern Eastern; Nilotic; Eastern; Ateker–Lotuko–Maa; Teso–Turkana
- Subdivisions: Teso; Turkanic Karimojong Nyangatom Toposa Turkana

Language codes
- ISO 639-3: –
- Glottolog: teso1248

The Teso–Turkana (or Ateker) languages are a group of closely related Eastern Nilotic languages spoken in southeastern South Sudan, northeastern Uganda, northwestern Kenya, and southwestern Ethiopia. In effect they form a dialect cluster consisting of c.2 million people. According to Gerrit Dimmendaal, most of these languages – Karimojong, Jie, Toposa, Turkana, and Nyangatom – are mutually intelligible, and for the most part differ only in regard to tone. Teso belongs to the same broad group but is not described as being as closely related to Turkana as the others.

The languages are:

- Teso–Turkana
  - Teso (Ateso)
  - Turkanic
    - Turkana
    - Karimojong (incl. Jie, Dodoth)
    - Toposa (incl. Jiye)
    - Nyangatom

== See also ==
- Ateker
