= Otuho language =

Eastern Nilotic language of South Sudan

Otuho
- Lotuko
- Region: South Sudan
- Ethnicity: Otuho, Logir, Ifoto, Imatong
- Native speakers: 310,000 (2017)
- Language family: Nilo-Saharan?: Eastern Sudanic?; Southern Eastern?; Nilotic; Eastern; Lotuko–Teso; Lotuko–Maa; Lotuko; Lotuko–Lokoya; Otuho
- Dialects: Koriok; Lomya (Lomia); Lowudo; Logotok
- Writing system: Latin

Language codes
- ISO 639-3: Either: lot – Otuho ddd – Dongotono
- Glottolog: otuh1238 Otuho dong1294 Dongotono

Otuho, also known as Lotuko (Lotuxo), is the language of the Otuho people. It is an Eastern Nilotic language, and has several other Otuho speaking dialect groups.

== Language varieties ==
Dongotono is related.

Other related varieties may be:

- Logir
- Ifoto
- Imatong
