= Clement Lochio Lomornana =

South Sudanese journalist

- Born: 1983; Namorunyang, Namorunyang State, Democratic Republic of Sudan
- Disappeared: 15 August 2015 (aged 31–32); Chukudum, East Equatoria, South Sudan
- Status: Missing for 11 years, 2 months and 25 days
- Citizenship: South Sudan
- Occupation: Journalist
- Years active: 2009–2015
- Employer: Gurtong Media

Clement Lochio Lomornana (born 1983; disappeared 15 August 2015) is a South Sudanese journalist and human rights activist. Through his work with Gurtong Media, he became known for his defence of media rights and freedom of speech in South Sudan, as well as his criticisms of the civil war. Lochio Lomornana was arrested on 6 August 2015, and has not been seen publicly since 15 August 2015, with some human rights organisations describing him as "presumed dead".

== Career ==
Lochio Lomornana is a member of the Didinga people and was originally from Namorunyang, a village in Kapoeta South County in Eastern Equatoria in what was then the Democratic Republic of Sudan. Lochio Lomornana and his family were displaced during the Second Sudanese Civil War, and in 1993 they were forced to flee their village due to shelling by the Sudanese People's Liberation Army, eventually settling in a refugee camp in Kenya. At the age of 10, Lochio Lomornana was forced to fight for the SPLA as a child soldier.

Lomornana worked as a journalist and photographer for Gurtong Media for six years at the time of his disappearance in 2015, and was based in Juba. Lochio Lomornana was a supporter of independence for South Sudan from Sudan, stating that South Sudanese people had been experienced "marginalisation and oppression" from the Sudanese government and citing cultural differences between the majority Muslim north and the Christian south; he voted for independence in the 2011 election. Lochio Lomornana is a Christian. Lochio Lomornana became an advocate for freedom of speech and of the media in post-independence South Sudan. Through Gurtong Media he attempted to introduce different ethnic groups to one another, including Didinga, Nuer, Dinka and Ketebo.

== Disappearance ==
In the months prior to his arrest, Lochio Lomornana reported harassment from state authorities, including being followed on a trip to Juba, and receiving death threats; the United Nations would later determine that he had been subject to surveillance, harassment and intimidation on several occasions between 2013 and 2015. This prompted Lochio Lomornana to flee the country in April 2015, staying first in Kenya and later Uganda, before returning to South Sudan in August 2015.

In the early hours of 6 August 2015, Lochio Lomornana was arbitrarily detained by security forces from his home in Chukudum, Budi County, East Equatoria, alongside two friends, brothers Amin and Nailo Venansio. The men were taken to military barracks were they were allegedly tortured by agents from Juba in order to get them to confess to crimes they had not committed. During their detainment, the Venansio brothers were permitted family visits, while Lochio Lomornana was not. The last recorded sighting of Lochio Lomornana and Nailo Venansio was on 15 August 2015, when local sources reported that the men had been seen being forced into a military vehicle. Amin Venansio was subsequently released without charge.

=== Response ===
South Sudanese authorities have officially denied having arrested Lochio Lomornana. Louis Lobong Lojore, the governor of Eastern Equatoria, declined to answer questions concerning the detainment of Lochio Lomornana and the Venansio brothers, and stated that any suspect arrested by security forces would be investigated and released if innocent. Mark Akio Ukinbul, the Minister of Information and Broadcasting for Eastern Equatoria, told Nation Mirror that he was unaware of any journalists being arrested in Budi County. The Budi County Commissioner, Felix Makuja, initially said that the men were being investigated before being potentially transferred to Torit or Juba for further investigation, before stating in a subsequent interview that he was not aware that the men had been detained or their locations.

Lochio Lomornana's family made unsuccessful attempts to locate him at military barracks in Torit, Kapoeta, and Juba. There were unconfirmed reports that Lochio Lomornana's headless body had been found along the Chukudum–Torit Road by members of the Didinga community. Lochio Lomornana's family said a body had been found of his driver but the beheaded bodies were decayed and had been partially consumed by vultures, making them impossible to identify. The Guardian and Human Rights Watch have both described Lochio Lomornana as "presumed dead", though he officially remains a missing person; his family told Radio Tamazuj that they believed he was dead and had held funeral rites for him. Local media, including Nyamilepedia, reported that Lochio Lomornana and the Venansio brothers had been killed by the South Sudan Intelligence Service.

In September 2015, the United Nations found that there was evidence that Lochio Lomornana had been tortured in detention, including being subjected to mock executions and sleep deprivation. In 2016, the Special Rapporteur expressed concern for Lochio Lomornana's safety, and urged the South Sudanese government to address concerns for his safety with a matter of urgency, and identified his detainment, torture, and disappearance as being directly linked to his "work as a journalist in defence of human rights".

In February 2016, Front Line Defenders reported on the six month anniversary of Lochio Lomornana's disappearance, expressing "grave concern" at his detainment and stating it was linked to his "peaceful and legitimate human rights work".
