= Iboni =

Village in Eastern Equatoria state

- Village
- Location in South Sudan
- Coordinates: 4°40′7.07″N 32°46′58.2″E
- Country: South Sudan
- State: Eastern Equatoria
- County: Torit County
- Time zone: Central Africa Time, GMT + 3

Iboni (or Ibonni) is one of the populated villages in Eastern Equatoria State of South Sudan situated some 50 km north-east of Torit. It may constitute or be a part of a group bearing its name, on Mount Lafit. The village is part of the great Omiaha Kingdom of the Lopit tribe, which also includes Atarangi, Ibahure, Imuluha, Ibele, Ohilang, and Hidonge Malangit.

C.G. Seligman a pioneer in British anthropology in their field trips to the Sudan in 1922 visited the Lomia rain-kingdom. He found an Igago woman (widow of the late Lomia rain-maker (Ayiru Mosingo) acting as chief. R. R. Somerset (now Lord Raglan) noted that when Queen Ikuma of the Lomia rain area wished to spit, she called her lady-in-waiting and spat into her hand.

Karlo Onuha (Queen Ikuma grandson) was an active supporter of the Anya-Nya movement. In March 1964, he (Onuha) was arrested by the Arabs. He was without grounds accused of harboring out-laws (the Anyanya). He was brought to Torit together with his mother. The mother followed the son, simply to plead with the Garrison Commander of Torit (the Colonel Abdel Monein Abdel Salaam) for the life of her only son. What happened was that the above named Colonel sentenced both Karlo and his mother (Itita Ohuro) to death. He executed them personally by firing from his sten-gun.

In Torit County, Sudanese troops raided several villages between February and May 1964, including Mura-Hatiha, Lopit-Iboni (in the Omiaha village area), Isaloro, Ofiriha, Imilai, Lobulo, Haforiere, Tuhubak, Obbo, and Pajok.

Iboni is the command post of Obunge Payam in the Imehejek Administrative Area of Eastern Equatoria state.
