= Government of Eastern Equatoria from 2010 =

The government of Eastern Equatoria from 2010 took office in Eastern Equatoria State of South Sudan in June 2010 following nationwide elections in April 2010. On 9 June 2010 the Governor, Brigadier General Louis Lobong Lojore, named his ministers and the County Commissioners. Nartisio Loluke Manir was appointed Deputy Governor.

== Ministers ==
Ministers appointed on 9 June 2010 were:

| Ministry | Minister |
|---|---|
| Local Government & Law Enforcement | Nartisio Loluke Manir (Deputy Governor) |
| Finance, Trade & Industry | Josephine Kulang Abalang |
| Agriculture, Forestry & Animal Resources | Jerome Gama Surur |
| Information & Communication | Nasike Allan Lochul |
| Education, Science & Technology | Michael Lopuke Lotyam |
| Health | Sam Felix Makuja |
| Environment, Wildlife Conservation & Tourism | George Echom Ekeno |
| Labour, Public Service & Human Resource | Emilo William Odingila |
| Roads & Transport | Peter Karlo Otim |
| Culture and Community/Social Development | Magdalena Beato Atiol |
| Housing & Public Utilities | Mark Akio Akinbul |

== County Commissioners ==
Governor Lobong named six County Commissioners on 9 June 2010 after consultations with community leaders. Commissioners of Budi and Lafon counties were still being discussed.

| County | Commissioner |
|---|---|
| Ikotos County | Peter Lokeng Lotone |
| Kapoeta South County | Martin Lorika Lojam |
| Magwi County | Peter Ochilo |
| Kapoeta East County | Titos Lokwacuma Loteam |
| Torit County | Felix Otuduha Siro |
| Kapoeta North County | Lokai Iko Loteyo |
| Budi County | Charles Adtul |
| Lafon County | Caesar Oromo Urbano |

== See also ==
- Government of Eastern Equatoria 2005–2010
