= Imatong State =

State of South Sudan from 2015 to 2020

- State
- Location of Imatong State in South Sudan
- Country: South Sudan
- Capital: Torit
- Number of Counties: 12

Population (2014 Estimate)
  - Total: 598,190

Imatong State was a state in South Sudan that existed between 2 October 2015 and 22 February 2020. It was located in the Equatoria region and it bordered Yei River to the southwest, Jubek to the west, Terekeka and Jonglei to the northwest, Boma to the northeast, Namorunyang to the east, and Uganda to the south.

== History ==
On 2 October 2015, President Salva Kiir issued a decree establishing 28 states in place of the 10 constitutionally established states. The decree established the new states largely along ethnic lines. A number of opposition parties and civil society groups challenged the constitutionality of the decree. Kiir later resolved to take it to parliament for approval as a constitutional amendment. In November the South Sudanese parliament empowered President Kiir to create new states.

Natisio Loluke was appointed Governor on 24 December.

== Geography ==
=== Administrative divisions ===
After the split up, Imatong State broke down even further for a total of 12 counties in the state (created in April 2016). The 12 counties are part of the 180 counties in South Sudan. The 12 counties are consisted of the following:

- Former Ikotos County:
  - Geria; headquarters: Locomo
  - Ikwoto; headquarters: Ikwoto
  - Kidepo Valley; headquarters: Chahari
- Former Lafon/Lopa County:
  - Imehejek; headquarters: Imehejek
  - Lafon; headquarters: Lafon
  - Lopit West; headquarters: Longiro
- Former Magwi County
  - Ayaci; headquarters: Ayaci
  - Magwi; headquarters: Magwi
  - Pageri; headquarters: Pageri
- Former Torit County:
  - Torit; headquarters: Torit
  - Torit East; headquarters: Hiyala
  - Torit West; headquarters: Kudo

The counties are further sub-divided into payams, and the payams are then further sub-divided into bomas.
