= Aloisio Emor Ojetuk =

Governor of Eastern Equatoria, South Sudan

Governor of Eastern Equatoria
- In office 2005–2010
- Succeeded by: Johnson Juma Okot

Aloisio Emor Ojetuk was governor of Eastern Equatoria State of South Sudan from 2005 to 2010.

In September 2006, Ojetuk said that the remnants of the former Equatoria Defence Forces (EDF) were being supplied with ammunition by the Sudanese Armed Forces and were still a threat to security. Many had joined the Sudanese People's Liberation Army but some refused to make this move. In January 2010, Ojetuk was seeking reelection in the April 2010 elections, while the SPLM state chairman Louis Lobong was also after the job.

== Council of Chiefs ==
In June 2006 Ojetuk appointed a council of chiefs, as follows:

Name	Position	Tribe
Remijo Amoi Okole	Chairman	Madi
Angello Marko Longolio	V. Chairman	Toposa
Anthony Lohide Jackson	Secretary-General	Horyok
Michael Otuba Otongol	Finance Secretary	Latuka
Valiriano Ranga Adola	Member	Pari
Ataib Tiburusio Tahita	Member	Latuka
Peter Tokwaro Owot	Member	Acholi
Alexander Oyet Anakeleto	Member	Acholi
Angello Oko Okot	Member	Pari
Lodovic Murras Marchano	Member	Dongotono
Ben Maku Patel	Member	Madi
Musa Lopwanya Lomiyiang	Member	Lango
Modesto Kenyi Paul	Member	Didinga
Hassan Urabi Kher-Alseed	Member	Toposa
Khamis Thomas Okanyi	Member	Lokoya
Servilio Molong Valentino	Member	Lopit
Paul Namolina Rujamoi	Member	Boya
Henry Asoba	Member	Tennet
