= Louis Lobong Lojore =

South Sudanese politician

Governor of Eastern Equatoria
- Incumbent
- Assumed office 29 June 2020

Governor of Kapoeta State
- In office 24 December 2015 – 22 February 2020

Governor of Eastern Equatoria
- In office 19 May 2010 – 2 October 2015
- Preceded by: Johnson Juma Okot

Personal details
- Born: 1962-1965 Kapoeta South County, Eastern Equatoria, South Sudan
- Party: SPLM
- Spouse(s): Natalina, Cecilia Lucy and Semira Louis
- Children: Lomukunyuo, Lopeam, Lokai, Nacheck, Loteam and more

Louis Lobong Lojore is a South Sudanese politician and a military governor in the rank of lieutenant general in the South Sudan People's Defence Forces (SSPDF) and the current governor of Eastern Equatoria State in South Sudan. He was the governor of Eastern Equatoria state from 2010 to 2015, governor of Kapoeta State from 2015 to 2020, and has been the governor of the recreated Eastern Equatoria state since 29 June 2020. Lobong is the longest serving governor in South Sudan.

== Early life ==
Louis Lobong Lojore was born between 1962 and 1965. He belongs to the Toposa, which is one of the largest ethnic groups of Eastern Equatoria State, and is from Kapoeta south County. Lojore became a brigadier general in the SPLA during the Second Sudanese Civil War (1983–2005). He was also secretary of the Southern Sudan Relief and Rehabilitation Agency (SSRRA) for Greater Kapoeta, Commissioner for greater Kapoeta and deputy governor for greater Equatoria.

When the civil war ended, Lobong was appointed Chief of the National Intelligence and Security Service for the Southern Sector of South Sudan. He was the SPLM State Chairman for Eastern Equatoria. In 2005, he was a candidate for governorship of Eastern Equatoria State, but Aloisio Emor Ojetuk was elected. It was said that Lobong failed to gain support for his candidacy from the chiefs in the State Conference in Chukudum in June 2005 due to dissatisfaction over his failure to prevent Toposa of Namorunyang from raiding and destabilizing the Lauro and Lotukei areas of Budi County.

Lobong was appointed chairman of the Southern Sudan Peace Commission. In October 2009, responding to the recent wave of ethnic violence, Lobong called for the government to take harsh measures to deter others from causing problems.

== Eastern Equatoria governor ==
Lobong took his oath of office on 19 May 2010 in a ceremony at the Eastern Equatoria State Legislative Assembly Hall in Torit, taking over from caretaker Governor Johnson Juma Okot. He promised to work towards the development of the state and to promote peace between the different communities. On 9 June 2010, he appointed his cabinet of state ministers, and also named the Commissioners for the eight counties of the state. After the successful referendum in January 2011 in which 99.95% of votes were for South Sudan secession, Lobong was visited by a delegation of women from all eight counties of Eastern Equatoria. He recognized the great contribution that women had made during the civil war and subsequent struggle leading up to the referendum, and called on them to help build peaceful ties between the different ethnic groups in the state.

In March 2011, Lobong said that claims that rebels loyal to George Athor had invaded Eastern Equatoria from Jonglei State were untrue. He said that Athor was using scare tactics to gain publicity, and said the people of Greater Equatoria were loyal to the democratic Government of South Sudan. In April 2011, Lobong said that at least six hundred thousand people were starving in Eastern Equatoria state due to a poor harvest in 2010. He called on NGOs to supply food and seed to the affected communities. He also asked NGOs to declare their budgets and objectives. This was needed to prevent corruption and so the government could direct its budget to unfunded areas.

In May 2011, Lobong announced that it would be illegal to carry arms in public places, and that this ban applied even to off-duty security personnel such as soldiers and policemen. That month, Lobong said that he would consult with President Salva Kiir about solving a dispute between the Lopit and Pari communities of Lafon-Lopa County over which community should supply the county commissioner. He said that he would discuss adding more counties with the President. Each of the 16 new counties would be more ethnically homogeneous. This runs counter to recommendations of a report issued in 2010 to which Lobong's Southern Sudan Peace Commission contributed. The report found that decentralization and division of administrations along ethnic lines could be aggravating tensions.

During the July 2011 independence celebrations, Lobong urged citizens to play an active role in suppressing cattle rustling, which he described as the biggest challenge to security in South Sudan, one of the poorest countries in the world. He called on them to develop a culture of hard work and to send their children to school. Lobong also called for cordial relations with neighboring countries, including Ethiopia. He said, "It is time for us to contribute at regional and international levels for the stability not only of the region but of the world. We need peace among ourselves and our sister countries".

Lobong was the only governor of Kapoeta State, from 24 December 2015 to 22 February 2020. The state was created by President Salva Kiir on 2 October 2015.

== See also ==
- Eastern Equatoria
- Government of Eastern Equatoria from 2010
