= Peter Gumbo Ungang =

Dr. Peter Gumbo Ungang

Minister for Parliamentary and Legal Affairs

Personal details
- Party: Other Political Parties (OPP)
- Occupation: Politician

Peter Gumbo Ungang is a South Sudanese politician who serves as the minister for parliamentary and legal affairs of Eastern Equatoria State. He was appointed to the position as part of the state government under South Sudan’s transitional political arrangements.

== Political career ==
=== Ministerial appointment ===
Gumbo was appointed Minister for Parliamentary and Legal Affairs in Eastern Equatoria State following a cabinet reshuffle.

=== Legislative and public activities ===
In 2025, Gumbo was involved in public consultations on constitutional matters in Eastern Equatoria State. The National Constitutional Review Commission (NCRC) conducted outreach to local legislators and communities, and Gumbo was quoted emphasizing the importance of engagement between lawmakers and residents.

Gumbo also participated in state-level development initiatives. For example, he took part in official delegations reviewing progress on donor-supported projects in Torit County, which focused on community livelihoods and resilience.

== Political affiliation ==
Gumbo is associated with the Other Political Parties (OPP), a political bloc represented in South Sudan’s transitional governance structures at both national and state levels.

== See also ==
- Eastern Equatoria State
- Politics of South Sudan
- Other Political Parties (South Sudan)
