= Palotaka =

- Location in South Sudan
- Coordinates: 4.050058°N 32.438679°E
- Country: South Sudan
- Region: Equatoria
- State: Eastern Equatoria
- County: Magwi County

Palotaka (sometimes spelled Palataka) as is a community in Magwi County of Eastern Equatoria state in South Sudan. It is about 20 kilometres (12 mi) southeast of Magwi.

At one time Palotaka was a thriving town. During the Second Sudanese Civil War (1983-2005) it was in turn a base for the Sudan People's Liberation Army and the Sudan Armed Forces, and was almost abandoned. In March 1993 Moli Tokoro and Borongoli camps were evacuated for Natinga after the National Islamic Front had made advances in the south. The route led through Palotaka, where about 800 of the unaccompanied minors decided to settle. Following the war, many refugees from Uganda have returned and are being helped to resettle by the United Nations High Commissioner for Refugees (UNHCR).
