= Lopez Lomong =

South Sudanese-born American track and field athlete

Lopez Lomong OLY
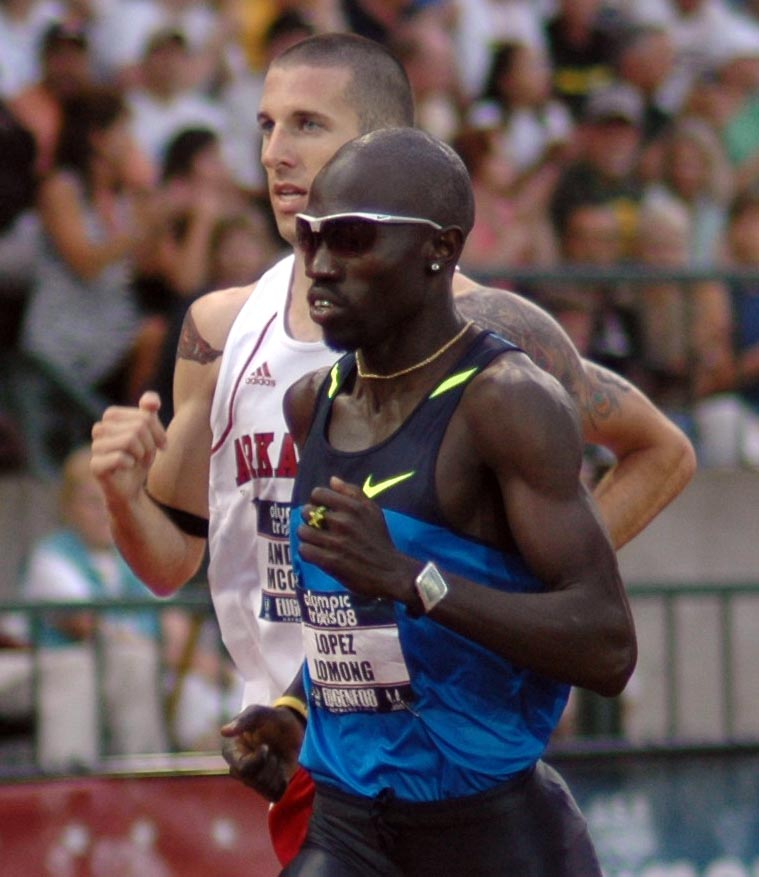
- Lomong running 1500 m at the US Olympic Team Trials in 2008

Personal information
- Full name: Lopez Lomong
- Nationality: American
- Born: January 5, 1985 (age 41) Kimotong, South Sudan
- Height: 5 ft 11 in (1.80 m)

Sport
- Country: United States
- Sport: Athletics/Track, Long-distance running
- Events: 800 m, 1500 m, Mile, 5000 m, 10,000 m
- College team: Northern Arizona Lumberjacks
- Club: Bowerman Track Club
- Coached by: Jerry Schumacher

Achievements and titles
- Olympic finals: 2008 Beijing; 1500 m, 21st (sf); 2012 London; 5000 m, 10th
- World finals: 2009 Berlin; 1500 m, 8th 2013 Moscow; 1500 m, 17th (sf); 2019 Doha; 10,000 m, 7th
- Personal bests: 800 m: 1:45.58 (Eugene 2008); 1500 m: 3:32.20 (Monaco 2010); Mile: 3:51.45 (Eugene 2013); Indoor Mile: 3:51.21i (New York 2013); 5000 m: 12:58.78 (Portland 2020); Indoor 5000 m: 13:07.00i (New York 2013); 10,000 m: 27:04.72 (Doha 2019)
Medal record
Men's athletics
Representing the United States
NACAC Championships
Gold medal – first place	2018 Toronto	10,000 m
Gold medal – first place	2015 Costa Rica	5000 m

Lopez Lomong (born January 5, 1985) is a South Sudanese-born American track and field athlete. Lomong, one of the Lost Boys of Sudan, came to the United States at the age of 16 and became a U.S. citizen in 2007.

Lomong qualified for the 2008 Summer Olympics in the 1500 meters at the United States Olympic track and field trials in Eugene, Oregon. He was the flag bearer for the United States during the 2008 Summer Olympics Opening Ceremony.

He is currently a member of Team Darfur, a group of athletes urging China to exert pressure on the Sudanese government to address the War in Darfur. Lomong's autobiography, Running for My Life, was published in 2012, co-written with Mark Tabb.

== Biography ==
Lopez Lomong was born Lopepe Lomong in Kimotong, an ethnic Buya village in Budi County, Namorunyang State, South Sudan to Awei Lomong and Rita Namana. Lomong's actual birthdate is January 5, 1985, but like all Lost Boys who came to the United States without paperwork, his official birthday is listed as January 1. Lopez Lomong and his family belong to the Buya (also spelled Boya) ethnic group of southeastern South Sudan, who speak the Laarim language.

Lomong was a victim of the Second Sudanese Civil War. A Catholic, he was abducted at age six while attending Catholic Mass and assumed dead by his family and buried in absentia. He nearly died in captivity, but was helped to escape by others from his village. The four of them ran for three days until they crossed the border into Kenya. Lomong spent ten years in the Kakuma refugee camp in Turkana County, northeastern Kenya before being moved to the United States through the Unaccompanied Refugee Minor program by Toomey Residential and Community Services. His name "Lopez" was a nickname from the refugee camp that he later adopted officially. He was inspired to become a runner after watching Michael Johnson at the 2000 Summer Olympics on television.

Lomong is one of the Lost Boys of Sudan. He was resettled in the United States in 2001 through the Unaccompanied Refugee Minor program with Robert and Barbara Rogers, in New York State. The Rogers have since gone on to help many other Sudanese refugees. Lomong attended Tully High School in Tully, NY, entering at a 10th grade level. In high school, he helped lead the cross country and track teams to sectional and state titles, and after briefly attending Norfolk State University, later competed for Northern Arizona University. In 2007, Lomong was the division I NCAA indoor champion at 3000 meters and the outdoor champion at 1500 meters while competing for Northern Arizona. He became a naturalized citizen of the United States on July 6, 2007.

Although he originally assumed his parents had been killed by the Sudan People's Liberation Army, he was reunited with his mother and family, who now live outside Nairobi, in 2003. He first returned to his native village of Kimotong in December 2006. He returned to Sudan again in 2008 with an organization called Sudan Sunrise to begin construction of the Lopez Lomong School and Reconciliation Church. In early 2009 he traveled back to bring his younger brothers, Alex and Peter, back to the United States to attend school at Fork Union Military Academy. Following in the footsteps of their elder brother Lopez, Peter Lomong ran for Northern Arizona University, while Alex Lomong ran for Ohio State University.

=== 2008 Summer Olympics ===
Lomong qualified for the US Olympic Team on July 6, 2008, one year after gaining his US citizenship. "Now I'm not just one of the 'Lost Boys,'" he told reporters. "I'm an American."

After his success at the collegiate level, Lopez signed a contract with Nike and began competing professionally. He specializes in the 1500m run but is a serious contender in every mid-distance race from 800m up to and including the 5k. Lopez finished 5th in the 800m finals during the 2008 US Olympic Trials, which he ran as part of his training for the 1500m.

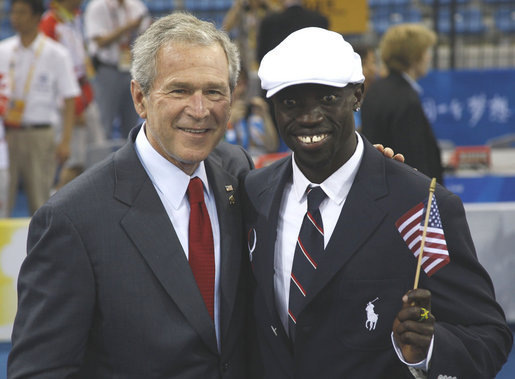
Lomong with US President George W. Bush during the Opening Ceremony in Beijing

Lomong was chosen by the team captains of the US Olympic team to carry the US flag in the Opening Ceremony at the 2008 Summer Olympics Opening Ceremony. The U.S. Olympic team captains said that Lomong deserved the honor of flagbearer because he was so proud of his citizenship.

Lopez is a member of Team Darfur. In the weeks leading up to the Olympics Lomong spoke often about the need to raise awareness for the violence in Darfur. Since his selection as flagbearer he has been careful not to criticize China directly, choosing instead to focus on the inspirational side of his story. "I'm here to compete for my country," Lomong told reporters when they asked questions about human rights. "The Olympics are supposed to bring people together to peacefully blend and I'm looking forward to that and stepping on the track and wearing my colors and representing my country." With reference to China specifically, Lomong answered "Chinese people have been great putting all these things together. It's great being here."

He was eliminated in the semifinals of the 1500 at the 2008 Olympic Games in Beijing.

=== 2009 USA Champion ===
Lomong won his first national title when he finished first in the 1500 at the 2009 USA Outdoor Championships in 3:41.68. That summer he also finished eighth in the final at the World Athletics Championships. He ran a career best of 3:32.94 that year in the 1500.

=== 2010 USA Champion ===
In June 2010, Lomong repeated as men's champion by winning the 1500 at the 2010 USA Outdoor Championships in a highly tactical race. He ran the final 400 meters of that race in 51.29 seconds. Later in the summer of 2010, Lomong lowered his personal best at 1500 meters down to 3:32.20 at the Diamond League meeting in Monaco.

=== 2012 ===
On April 29, 2012, Lomong raced his first ever 5000m at the Payton Jordan Invitational. Despite miscalculating his laps and thinking he had finished when he actually had one lap left, he set a 2012 World Leading time of 13:11.63. Lomong continued his success at the 2012 US Olympic Track & Field Trials. He secured a slot for the 5000m finals after winning his preliminary heat in 13:42.81, just ahead of American record holder Bernard Lagat (13:42.83). In the finals, he placed 3rd behind winner Galen Rupp and runner up Bernard Lagat to secure a spot on his second Olympic team.
London Olympics
On August 8, 2012, Lomong placed 4th in his preliminary heat to qualify for the 5000m finals. In the final, which took place on August 11, 2012, he finished in 10th place. Lomong was part of a strong American performance, with fellow countrymen Bernard Lagat and Galen Rupp placing 4th and 7th, respectively.

=== 2013 ===
Lomong participated in the NYRR Men's Wanamaker Mile at the 2013 Millrose Games. He won the race in a personal best time of 3:51.21, just ahead of Matthew Centrowitz, a decorated 1500m man. Lomong's time beat the previous Armory track record of 3:53.92 which had just been set in 2012 by Centrowitz as well as the Millrose record of 3:52.87 set by Bernard Lagat. Lomong surpassed the previous indoor 5000m American Record held by Bernard Lagat at the Armory's last chance meet with a time of 13:07.00.

=== 2014 ===
Lomong won the 1500 metres in 3:43.09 at the USA Indoor Track and Field Championships at the Albuquerque Convention Center in New Mexico.

Lomong finished 18th in the 1500 meters on March 7, 2014 at the 2014 IAAF World Indoor Championships.

Lopez finished 3rd running 3:39.11 at USA Outdoor Track and Field Championships in Sacramento, California on June 28.

=== 2015 ===
On March 1, Lomong finished 8th in the mile at USATF Indoor Championships hosted at the Reggie Lewis Center, Boston, MA.

In June, Lomong finished 6th in 13:53.64 in 5000 meter at USATF Outdoor Championships hosted at Hayward Field, Eugene, Oregon.

On August 8, Lomong won the 5000 meter NACAC 2015 Senior Championships hosted at Estadio Nacional de Costa Rica, San Jose, Costa Rica.

=== 2017 ===
In May 2017 Lomong served as a pacer for Nike's Breaking2 attempt at achieving a sub-2-hour marathon time.

=== 2018 ===
In June, Lomong won the USATF Outdoor Championship in the 10,000 metres at Drake Stadium, Des Moines, Iowa.

On July 4, Lopez Lomong placed 5th in 28:59 at 2018 Peachtree Road Race.

On August 3, Lomong won 2018 Sir Walter Miler in 3:53.86 in the same race John Gregorek Jr., Sam Prakel, Patrick Casey, Ben Blankenship, Craig Engels, Sean McGorty, Hassan Mead, Charlie Marquardt, Robert Domanic, Graham Crawford, Jacob Thomson, Cristian Soratos ran under 4:00.

=== 2019 ===
Lomong repeated as 10,000 metres national champion at the 2019 USATF Outdoor Championship. He finished first in the 5000 metres as well, becoming the first to double in the two national championship events since 2012.

== See also ==
- 2008 Summer Olympics national flag bearers

Olympic Games
Preceded by Chris Witty	Flagbearer for United States; Beijing 2008	Succeeded by Mark Grimmette
