= Government of Eastern Equatoria 2005–10 =

In South Sudan

The Government of Eastern Equatoria from 2005 to 2010 took office in Eastern Equatoria State of South Sudan after a peace treaty was signed between the Sudan People's Liberation Movement and the government of Sudan based in Khartoum. Elections were originally planned for 2009, but were postponed until April 2010.

== State government ==
The State Government, headed by Governor was appointed by the President.

Position	Office holder
Governor	Brigadier General Aloisio Emor Ojetuk
Deputy Governor	MP George Echom
Secretary General for State Government	Cyprian Okuye Atar

=== Advisers to the Governor ===
1. Security Affairs – Mr. Marcello Otwari Dominic
2. Administration Affairs – Angelo Vugga
3. Political Affairs – Dr. Robert Lokamu
4. Human Rights – Agnes Lox Nedo

=== Ministries ===
Ministry	Minister	Director General
Local Government and Law Enforcement	MP George Echom (Deputy Governor)	
Finance	Hon. MP. Fredrick Tulio Odong	Mr. John Kenyi Geri
Education	MP Prof. Francis Ben Baba	Mr. James Amoko
Information and Communication	MP Bernard Loki	Mr. Michael G. Saleh
Agriculture	MP Betty Achan Ogwaro	Mr. Louise Rex L.
Health	MP Florence Nigty	Dr. Lenny Loromo
Social Development	MP Patrick Lodinga	Mr. Julias Okeny Okoy
Physical Infrastructure	MP Morris Kaunda Merisia	Mr. Solomon Sidoro

== Interim Legislative Assembly ==
- Speaker of State Assembly – Sabina Dario Lokolong (SPLM)
- Deputy Speaker – Martin Odwar Lonuha (SPLM)
- Leader of Government Business – Paul Napwon Yonai

=== Representatives ===
- Sabina Dario Lokolong (SPLM) – Budi County
- Martin Odwar Lonuha (SPLM) – Ikotos County
- Paul Napwon Yonai (SPLM) – Kapoeta South
- Arungogle Rino Loremo (SPLM) – Budi County
- Jamal Peter Lotipe (SSDF) – Kapoeta North County
- Julius Ajeo Moilinga (SPLM) – Magwi County
- Agnes Florence Odwar – Torit County
- Paul Okot Bara (SANU) – Magwi County
- Oromo Baranaba Ekol (SPLM) – Lopa County
- Karlo Lopuke Amoni (SPLM) – Kapoeta East County
- Mark Uttor Owitti (NCP) – Lopa County
- Aziz Atari Aziz (SPLM) – Ikotos County
- Josephine Thomas (SPLM) – Torit County
- Vitale Aburi Lomiluk (USAP 1 ) – Magwi County
- Fermo Peter Issara (NCP) – Torit County
- Osfald Tafeng (USAP 2) – Torit County
- Dominic Otwari Theodore (USAP 2) – Torit County
- Patrick Bafura Paul (FORUM)
- Arnold Hatulang
- Mark Taban
- Charles Rino Atul (SSDF) – Budi County
- Martin Lopir Lotubai (SPLM) – Kapoeta South County
- Alma Maha Thomas
- Emmanuel Ambrose Ocholimoi (SPLM) – Torit County
- Urbano Oyet Jobojobo (SPLM) – Magwi County
- Elizabeth Idor James (SPLM) – Lopa County
- Semira Louis Lojore (SPLM) – Kapoeta South County
- Joseph Celepus Lonok (NCP) – Kapoeta North County
- Offis Asada Otome (SPLM) – Torit County
- Hakim Iko (SPLM) – Kapoeta North County
- Robert Lochan Ngiroluk (SPLM) – Kapoeta North County
- Benjamin Lopeyok (SPLM) – Kapoeta East County
- Irene Peter Paul (SPLM) – Kapoeta South County
- Ohisa Affwoni Lais (SANU) – Torit County
- Abel Uchan Idris (SPLM) – Lopa County
- Jeremy K. Africa (SPLM) – Ikotos County
- Marko Lokitoe Lokuuta (SPLM) – Kapoeta South County
- Martin Milla – Magwi County
- Cypriano Lonyangatom (SPLM) – Kapoeta East County
- Christine Nakwar Patrick (SPLM) – Kapoeta East County
- Clement Otto Kulo – Magwi County
- Peter Bosco Lotyang (SPLM) – Budi County
- Perina Laweno (NCP) – Magwi County
- Marko Mustafa Lotinomoi (NCP) – Budi County

=== Business Committees ===
Committee	Chairperson	Party
Finance and Public Accounts	Hon. Arungule Rino Loremo	SPLM
Services	Hon. Jamal Peter Lotipe	SSDF
Legislation and Legal Affairs	Hon. Julius Ajeo Moilinga	SPLM
Human Rights	Hon. Agnes Florence Odwar	
Land and Physical Infrastructure	Hon. Paul Okot Bara	SANU
Culture and Information	Hon. Oromo Barnaba Eko	

=== Directorate of Contracts, Legal Aid, Human Rights Conventions and Treaties ===
- Director – Paul Mayak Marrier
- Deputy Director – Majok Dau Kuot
- Third Legal Counsellor – Chol Awow Lual
- Legal Counsellor – Machar Ader Ader Nyong
- Legal Counsellor – Chan Jarico Tuong Nyibong
- Legal Counsellor – Marko Bol Deng
- Legal Counsellor – Akol Deng Back Deng
- Legal Counsellor – Biu Lat Mading

== See also ==
- Government of Eastern Equatoria from 2010
