= Southern Sudan Peace Commission =

The Southern Sudan Peace Commission (SSPC) was established in 2006. The purpose of the Peace Commission is promote peace among the people of South Sudan and to help consolidate the results of the Comprehensive Peace Agreement (CPA) signed in January 2005 between the Sudan People's Liberation Movement (SPLM) and the Government of Sudan.

== Goals and activities ==
The SSPC is involved in building the capacity of local communities to reduce conflict and prevent escalation. Challenges included avoiding conflict during the national elections in July 2009 and the self-determination referendum of early 2011.

The SSPC has facilitated broad based peace conferences in Greater Equatoria, Greater Upper Nile and Greater Bahr El Ghazel. In March 2009 the SSPC was attempting to defuse tension after clashes had taken place between Murle and Lou Nuer tribes in the Lokwangole area of Jonglei State. More than 460 people had died and over 3,000 had been displaced. This followed an outbreak of inter-ethnic violence in the state where hundreds of people died and over 5,000 people were displaced in and around Pibor county.

In October 2009, responding to the recent wave of ethnic violence, SSPC Chairman Louis Lobong Lojore called for the government to take harsh measures to deter others from causing problems.

In 2010 researchers from the London School of Economics, the SSPC and the Centre for Peace and Development Studies of Juba University undertook a study of approaches to reducing violence in South Sudan. It found that the different goals of state building, modernization, conflict management and traditionalism had led to incoherent approaches that actively promoted conflict. Decentralization and division of administrations along ethnic lines could be aggravating tensions, and tribal leaders could inadvertently be amplifying the divisions.

== Leadership ==
In June 2006, General Salva Kiir, President of the Government of Southern Sudan, appointed Simon Kun Puoch Chairperson and Reverend William Chan Achuil Deputy Chairperson of the SSPC. As of 2011 the SSPC chairman was Brigadier General (retired) Louis Lobong Lojore. He had previously been Commissioner for greater Kapoeta and Deputy Governor for the greater Equatoria during the war. Lojore is also the SPLM State Chairman for Eastern Equatoria, Torit.
