= Namorunyang =

- village
- Location of Namorunyang State in South Sudan
- Country: South Sudan
- Region: Equatoria
- State: Eastern Equatoria
- County: Kapoeta South County

Government
  - Governor: Louis Lobong Lojore

Population (2014 Estimate)
  - Total: 504,720

Namorunyang is a village and Payam of Kapoeta South County in Eastern Equatoria, South Sudan.

There has been a long history of conflict between the Toposa of Namorunyang and Bunio and the Didinga of Budi County. The Toposa are purely pastoralist and the Didinga are agro-pastoralists. In the dry season the Toposa would drive their cattle to the Didinga Hills for water and pasture until the rains began in Toposa land. In the past, this practice was carried out by agreement between the two communities, with a gift being made in exchange for the right to access the pasturage. With the proliferation of guns and breakdown of order during the civil war, the traditional protocols were ignored and violence became common.

In May 2007 Toposa tribesmen of Namorunyang raided the Ngauro Payam of Budi County, attacked a group that were resting after working in a collectively-owned field, and took 300 head of cattle and 400 goats or sheep. 49 women, 4 children and 5 men were killed, while others were wounded. In the past, Namorunyang village was one of the peace centers used to resolve conflict between the communities of the region. At a conference in September 2009 organized by the Southern Sudan Peace Commission and chaired by Brigadier General Louis Lobong Lojore it was agreed to revive this and other joint peace centres.

== Notable residents ==
- Clement Lochio Lomornana, journalist.
