= Peter Lomong =

American athletics competitor

Personal information
- Nationality: American
- Born: July 6, 1996 (age 29) Kimotong, South Sudan

Sport
- Sport: Long-distance running
- Event: 400 m – 5 km
- College team: Northern Arizona University

Achievements and titles
- Personal best(s): 400 m: 51.37; 800 m: 1:52.37; 1500 m: 3:46.89; 3000 m: 8:16.09; 5000 m: 14:09.32

Peter Lomong (born July 6, 1996, in Kimotong, Budi County, Kapoeta State, South Sudan) is a South Sudanese-American runner who competed for Northern Arizona University in Flagstaff, Arizona, US. His elder brother Lopez Lomong also competed for Northern Arizona University.

== Early life ==
Peter Lomong was born on July 6, 1996, to Rita Namana and Longoyathiya Lomongom. He belongs to the Buya tribe of southeastern South Sudan. After emigrating to the United States from a refugee camp in Kenya, Lomong attended Fork Union Military Academy in Virginia.

Lomong's younger brother, Alex Lomong, ran for Ohio State University.
