= Civil Authority for the New Sudan =

Civil Authority for the New Sudan or (CANS) was an interim organization formed by the Sudan People's Liberation Movement during the Second Sudanese Civil War to administer the rebel-controlled areas. It is the most direct predecessor to the Government of Southern Sudan (GoSS).

The idea for the CANS originated in the SPLM's September 7–12, 1991 meeting in Torit. It was formally called into being by the "Vision and Programme of the Sudan People's Liberation Movement" published by the SPLM Political Secretariat in March 1998.

After the end of the war, the CANS was transformed into the GoSS, as outlined in the 2004 SPLM Strategic Framework for War-to-Peace Transition. Riek Machar was responsible for executing this transformation.
