= Narim =

Narim may refer to:

- Narim people, an ethnic group in South Sudan
- Narim, a fictional character in the television series Stargate SG-1

== See also ==
- Narym
