= Obunge =

Payam in the Imehejek Administrative Area of South Sudan

Obunge is a payam, historically known as Lopit Central Payam located in LoPa/Lafon County (specifically within the Imehejek Administrative Area) of Eastern Equatoria State, South Sudan with its bomas Igure, Ibonni, Ifohe and Hatiru. It is a district primarily inhabited by the Lopit community.

Its population according to the 2008 census conducted by Sudan, prior to South Sudanese independence, was approximately 15,000.

The payam’s headquarters or "command post" is located in Ibonni. It is one of several payams in the area, alongside others such as Ohutok, Imehejek, Arilo, Bule, and Longiro.

The name "Obunge" holds historical weight for the local community, notably as a location where John Garang, the late leader of the SPLM/A, stayed in 1989.

The area is served by the St. John the Baptist Parish Ibonni, which is part of the Catholic Diocese of Torit which runs St. Mary’s Primary School, Ibonni.

The area occupied the Omiaha sub-community of Lopit is characterized by rural, fertile land suitable for cultivation, though it has faced periodic security challenges related to local disputes.

As of early 2026, the Payam Head Chief has been active in promoting peace through initiatives like Inter-Payam Peace Tournaments to strengthen unity among the Lopit people.

The payam has been led by various local figures, including Queen Ikuma Basha, who is recognized for bringing stability to the administration, and current traditional leaders who oversee local peace and security.
