= Lopid =

Lopid may refer to:

- the Lopit people
- the Lopit language
- the cholesterol drug gemfibrozil
