= Torit Airport =

- IATA: n/a; ICAO: HSTR

Summary
- Airport type: Public, Civilian
- Owner: Civil Aviation Authority of South Sudan
- Serves: Torit, South Sudan
- Location: Torit, South Sudan
- Elevation AMSL: 2,018 ft / 615 m
- Coordinates: 04°24′40″N 32°34′44″E

Map
- Location of Torit Airport in South Sudan

Runways
Direction	Length		Surface
Direction	ft	m	Surface
15/33	3,280	1,000	Unpaved

Torit Airport is an airport serving the town of Torit, in South Sudan.

== Location ==
Torit Airport (IATA: n/a, ICAO: HSTR) is located in Torit County, Eastern Equatoria, in the town of Torit, near the International border with the Republic of Uganda. The airport is located to the northeast of the central business district of the town.

This location lies approximately 120 kilometres (75 mi), by air, east of Juba International Airport, the largest airport in South Sudan. The geographic coordinates of Torit Airport are: 4° 24' 40.00"N, 32° 34' 44.00"E (Latitude: 4.411110; Longitude: 32.578890). This airport sits at an elevation of 615 metres (2,018 ft) above sea level. The airport has a single unpaved runway, the dimensions of which are not publicly known at this time.

== Overview ==
Torit Airport is a small civilian airport that serves the town of Torit and surrounding communities. There are no known scheduled airlines serving this airport at this time.

== See also ==
- Torit
- Eastern Equatoria
- Equatoria
- List of airports in South Sudan
