= Lafon, South Sudan =

Lafon
- Location in South Sudan
- Coordinates: 5.033234°N 32.469063°E
- Country: South Sudan
- Region: Equatoria
- State: Eastern Equatoria
- County: Lafon County
- Time zone: UTC+2 (CAT)

Lafon is located in Eastern Equatoria State of South Sudan, the headquarters of Lafon County. The people belong to the Pari ethnic group. Lafon Hill is a small, rocky elevation that rises abruptly from the surrounding plain. It is covered with terraced, Pari villages. Traditionally the people made their living primarily from cattle herding.
