= Lopit =

Lopit may refer to:

- Lopit people
- Lopit language
