= Torit County =

- County
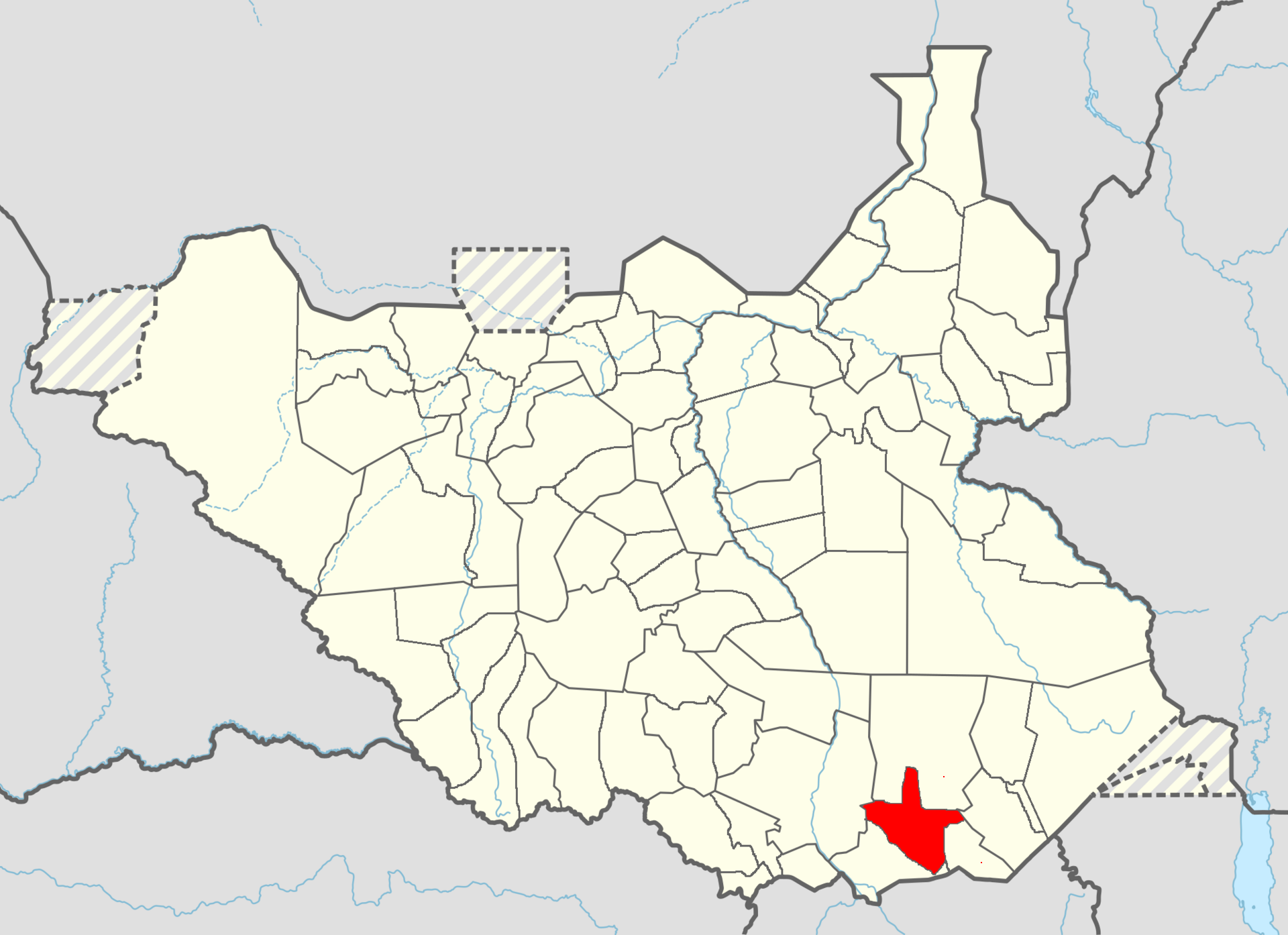
- Location in South Sudan
- Coordinates: 4°25′N 32°34′E
- Country: South Sudan
- Region: Equatoria
- State: Eastern Equatoria
- Headquarters: Torit

Government
  - County Commissioner: Fermo Peter Isara

Area
  - Total: 2,253 sq mi (5,835 km^{2})

Population (2017 estimate)
  - Total: 153,314
  - Density: 68.05/sq mi (26.27/km^{2})
- Time zone: UTC+2 (CAT)

Eastern Equatoria State – Torit County in the Southwest

Torit County is an administrative region in Eastern Equatoria of South Sudan, with headquarters in the town of Torit, which is also the state capital.

== Location ==
Torit County is located in Eastern Equatoria, in southeastern South Sudan, close to the border with Kenya and Uganda. Eastern Equatoria is one of the ten states of South Sudan. Torit County is bordered by Lafon County to the north, Budi County to the east, Ikotos County to the southeast, Magwi County to the southwest and Juba County in Central Equatoria to the west. (See map to the right).

The town of Torit, where the county headquarters are located, lies approximately 150 kilometres (93 mi), by road, east of Juba, the capital and largest city in South Sudan. The coordinates of Torit County are: 4° 30' 0.00"N, 32° 30' 0.00"E (Latitude: 4.5000; Longitude: 32.5000).

== Overview ==
Torit County was earlier split into 8 payams. The payams that constitute Torit County include the following:

1. Bur Payam
2. Ifwotu Payam
3. Kudo Payam
4. Hiyala Payam
5. Himodonge Payam
6. Imurok Payam
7. Nyong Payam
8. Iyire Payam

The town of Torit, the capital of Eastern Equatoria, is also the headquarters of Torit County, one of the eight counties which make up Eastern Equatoria. The Imatong Mountains lie partly in the southern part of Torit County. In April 2016, the county was divided into 3 counties, with 2 new counties of Torit East and Torit West being carved out of the county.

== History ==
Torit County was formed in 1934 by the merging of the districts of Teretenya and Opari. Opari was the district administrative headquarters for the regions inhabited by the Lotuko (Otuho), Madi and Acholi ethnic groups. Torit county was adversely affected by both the Second Sudanese Civil War and by the activities of the Lord's Resistance Army. As late as 2006, a significant portion of its population was still internally displaced within South Sudan.

== Population ==
The 2008 Sudanese census estimated the population of Torit County at approximately 99,740 Although these results were disputed by the South Sudanese authorities, they are the only recent figures available and form a basis on which newer studies can be based.

In April 2016, the state was divided into 3 counties with 2 new counties called Torit East and Torit West being carved out of it.

== Tribes in Torit county ==
- Lotuko: A Nilotic ethnic group that lives in areas with mountain spurs and ranges
- Otuho: An ethnic group that lives in Torit County
- Madi: An ethnic group that lives in Torit County
- Acholi: An ethnic group that lives in Torit County
- Lokoya: An ethnic group that lives in the region between Jubek State and Eastern Equatoria State
- Ketebo: One of the smallest and least known tribes in South Sudan, who live in Bira, one of Torit County's Payam

== See also ==
- Torit
- Torit Airport
- Eastern Equatoria
- Equatoria
- Iboni
