= Parjok =

Pajok
- Town
- Location in South Sudan; Location on Map is approximate
- Coordinates: 3.872352°N 32.479169°E
- Country: South Sudan
- Region: Equatoria
- State: Eastern Equatoria
- County: Magwi County
- Payam: Pajok Payam
- State Representative: Payam Member of Parliament (MP)

Government
  - State Member of Parliament: John Ochan Bongomin Nono (SPLM)

Population (January 2012)
  - Total: 49,000
  - Summer (DST): +3GMT
- Area code: +211

Pajok (also Parjok, Parajok) is a community in Eastern Equatoria, a state of South Sudan. It is in the southern part of Magwi County, 39 kilometres (24 miles) south of Magwi, near the border with Uganda.

== Population and geography ==
The main ethnic group are the Acholi people, who live on both sides of the border between South Sudan and Uganda in this region, divided by an arbitrary boundary defined by the Colonial British in 1926. The soil is volcanic in origin and rich. The town has a small gazetted forest reserve of 23 hectares (57 acres).

== History ==
During the Second Sudanese Civil War (1983–2005), the Sudan People's Liberation Army (SPLA) captured Pajok from the government. The SPLA was weakened by internal dissension, and Pajok was among the towns recaptured by the government between 1991 and 1994. However, by December 1995 the SPLA had regained the town. In 1995 Sudan and Uganda broke off diplomatic relations. The next year the Sudanese Government accused Uganda of attacking the areas of Pajok and Teit.

The civil war ended in January 2005 and reconstruction began. The Lord's Resistance Army continued activity in and around the area, attacking the impoverished refugees in camps in north Uganda and South Sudan, including Pajok. A report of September 2005 said that refugees were starting to return, with 1,000 out of a population of 5,000 in Pajok targeted for assistance. Work was planned to reconstruct a primary health care unit in the town. In November 2008 UNICEF, in partnership with MEDAIR, handed over an emergency water treatment system to Pajok. The system was built in response to a cholera epidemic, and was capable of serving 2,000 people.

A 2010 report noted that lack of adequate roads is a serious problem. The people of Pajok got a bumper harvest of sesame in 2008 but could not sell it due to the cost of transport. As a result, they did not grow much sesame in the following year.

In 2012, a border dispute (see Ngom Oromo Dispute) between South Sudan and Uganda escalated into a series of border clashes that happened again in the April and August 2015,

== Subclans of Pajok ==
Pajok is made up of several subclans. The town is divided into "Lacam and Lacwic" - literally meaning left (West) and right (East) portions of the town. Among the subclans on Lacam side are: Panto, Ayu, Biti, Pagaya, Kwac-lanyuru, Bura, Pamuda, Lamogi, Palyec, Obwolto, Panyagiri and Patogo. On Lacwic side are the Ywaya Katum, Ywaya pa Rwot, Ywaya Bol meja, Ywaya Lamwo, Oyere, Paitenge, Toro, Patanga, Paliyo, Kapa and Bobi.

== Notable Pajok people ==
- Hon. Benaiah Benjamin Kitara, Chairperson of Revenue Authority, Eastern Equatoria State
- Hon. Angela Achiro Onorio, Women representative in State Legislative Assembly
- Hon. Tobias Xavier Lotto
- Hon. John Ochan Bongomin; MP-Pajok Payam, Magwi County and State Minister of Cabinet and Parliamentary Affairs Eastern Equatoria State

== Associations ==
Pajok Community members are found in all the States of South Sudan and in diaspora in locations such as North America, Australia, New Zealand, Europe and, less commonly, in Asia. Wherever they are, Community members have strong ties with Pajok Communities across the world. They are organized into groups that serve the interests of the groups` areas of jurisdictions, those residing in Pajok and beyond. Some of those groups are Agola Kapuk Association of North America (U.S.A. and Canada), Agola Kapuk Australia Inc. and Anyira Pajok Community of South Australia whose aims include; supporting members during happy and difficult times, helping youth learn how to read and write Acholi, encouraging members to adapt to the laws, regulations and cultures of respective jurisdictions, promotion of the general welfare, interests and culture of Acholi Pajok women in South Australia, strengthening communication and cooperation within community in addressing Acholi Pajok women's and children's issues and needs and presenting a united voice on matters affecting Acholi Pajok women and children in Australia.

In Australia, the community meets in conferences after every two years to discuss matters that are of importance to it in Australia and its people in South Sudan and its members in North America. It used to meet after every year but this was changed to two years in the Sydney 2011 conference. Apart from discussing pertinent issues in those conferences, the members find the gatherings to be an opportunity for them to meet with one another given the fact that Australia is a very large continent where people do not easily meet with each other. In 2007, the community held its first conference in Sydney; New South Wales, in 2009 - 2010, it had it in Tasmania, in 2010 - 2011, it was in Brisbane; Qld, in 2011 - 2012, it was held in Sydney; New South Wales again and in 2013 - 2014, it had it in Perth Western Australia, in 2015 - 2016, it had it in Melbourne, Victoria and In 2017 – 2018, the community held its conference in Adelaide, South Australia. in that conference, it was decided where it was going to hold the next conference. In 2020, the conference was held in Brisbane - Queensland. In 2024, the community held its conference in Perth, Western Australia. in 2025 - 2026, it held its conference in Melbourne Victoria

All these Conferences are funded by Agola Kapuk Community members` contributions and occasionally some additional funding is provided by respective Australia` State and Territory Governments including other community-based organisations such as LotteryWest. Agola Kapuk North America has successfully had its first Conference in Nashville, Tennessee in 2016. There is always After-Conference Party where people from all walks of life are invited to attend and or participate in. Activities that take place in the After-Conference Party are Acholi traditional and contemporary music, African and western music extravaganza, free drinks and foods, catching up with mates, speeches from community and church leaders, games and fun.
