= Tully Junior Senior High School =

Location
- 5848 State Route 80; Tully, New York 13159; United States; 42°47′46″N 76°6′52″W

Information
- Type: Public
- School district: Tully Central School District
- Superintendent: Robert Hughes
- NCES School ID: 362913003927
- Principal: Mike O’Brien
- Teaching staff: 39.04 (on an FTE basis)
- Grades: 6-12
- Enrollment: 367 (2024-2025)
- Student to teacher ratio: 9.40
- Campus: Rural: Distant
- Colors: Red and Black
- Mascot: Black Knights
- Newspaper: Knight Insight
- Yearbook: Oracle
- Website: www.tullyschools.org/highschool

Tully Junior Senior High School is a combined public school building housing students in grades 6-12 in Tully, New York. It is part of Tully School District in Onondaga County. It made national news when its alumnus, Lopez Lomong carried the flag for the US Olympic team at the Beijing Summer Olympics.

== History ==
Education in Tully began as early as 1801 when Miss Ruth Thorpe established a school in the town. In 1898, Tully Union School received a charter from the Board of Regents to establish a high school in the district. The high school offered classes in the current elementary school building from 1930-1969 when the town constructed a new building.

== Academics ==
Students can earn a place on the High Honor Roll (94.5%+), the Honor Roll (89.5%+) or the Merit Roll (84.5%+). Teachers also select students to enter into National Honor Society. Initial eligibility requires a 90% average or higher. In addition, a faculty selection committee determines whether or not a student meets the leadership, service, and character components of the organization.

== Athletics ==
Tully competes in the following interscholastic athletics: Baseball, Basketball, Cheerleading, Cross Country, Football, Golf, Indoor Track, Lacrosse, Soccer, Softball, Track and Field, Volleyball, and Wrestling. Tully is noted as a distance running powerhouse across the league, Section 3 and the state. Tully Boys Cross Country has won the State Championship Title 3 times: 2000, 2003 and 2006. On the track, most notable is the Boys 4x800m relay. The 4x8 has been won for Division 2 (small schools) three years in a row, 2007 (Hartnett, Burke, Stachowski, Vander Molen) in 8:05.23, 2008 (Stachowski, Burke, Weber, Hartnett) in 7:54.07 and 2009 (Sam, Palladino, Haskins, Weber) in 7:59.76. Only one other 4x8 team in school history broke 8:00. On it was future Olympian Lopez Lomong and standout foster brother Dominic Luka. Every State Title in school history has been captured by boys running.

Furthermore, in addition to the success of the Cross Country team, the achievements of the Tully Girls' Soccer, and Tully Golf program have been noteworthy. The Boys Basketball team is also highly successful winning 12 OHSL Championships since 1984, 3 Section 3 Championships in 2004, 2006, and 2010, and an appearance in the Class C State Finals in 2004. Boys and Girls Lacrosse teams have produced many Division 1 players and All-Americans.

A former Tully cross country athlete, alumnus Lopez Lomong, carried the flag for the United States during the 2008 Summer Olympics opening ceremony in Beijing, China where he finished 20th in the world. Lomong is preparing for the Olympic Qualifiers in Flagstaff, AZ before London.

In the 1976-1979 period Tully was known best for its Wrestling championships and was able to win 3 Onondaga High School League Championships in this period. Coaches Kavalchek and Heymann went on to be nationally known as well.

== Activities ==
=== School newspaper ===
From 2006-2008, Tully students publish an online newspaper called TBK Today. Previous incarnations of the school newspaper include a print version, Knight Insight, produced from 1997-1999.

=== Drama ===
In 2003, Tully won the Pavilion Theatre Awards "best overall play" category for its production of Les Miserables. The Pavilion Theatre Awards honors regional high school drama programs.

=== Agriculture program ===
In 2003, the school's agriculture program was in line to lose its funding. In response to this, the local community was able to ensure the existence of the program and also earned a grant of $50,000 to build a greenhouse on campus.

== In the news ==
In 2022, the Knight Insight was to publish one of its regular "Senior Spotlight" profiles of outstanding students. When the student to be profiled responded to the publication's question as to the greatest challenge he had overcome, he spoke of overcoming homophobic bullying. Principal Mike O'Brien forbade the item to run and advised the student that mention of sexual orientation was against school district policy. District superintendent Robert J. Hughes subsequently apologized and permitted the item to be published following social media and press coverage of the incident and an emergency meeting of the Board of Education.
