= Carlisle Peace Commission =

British peace commissioners

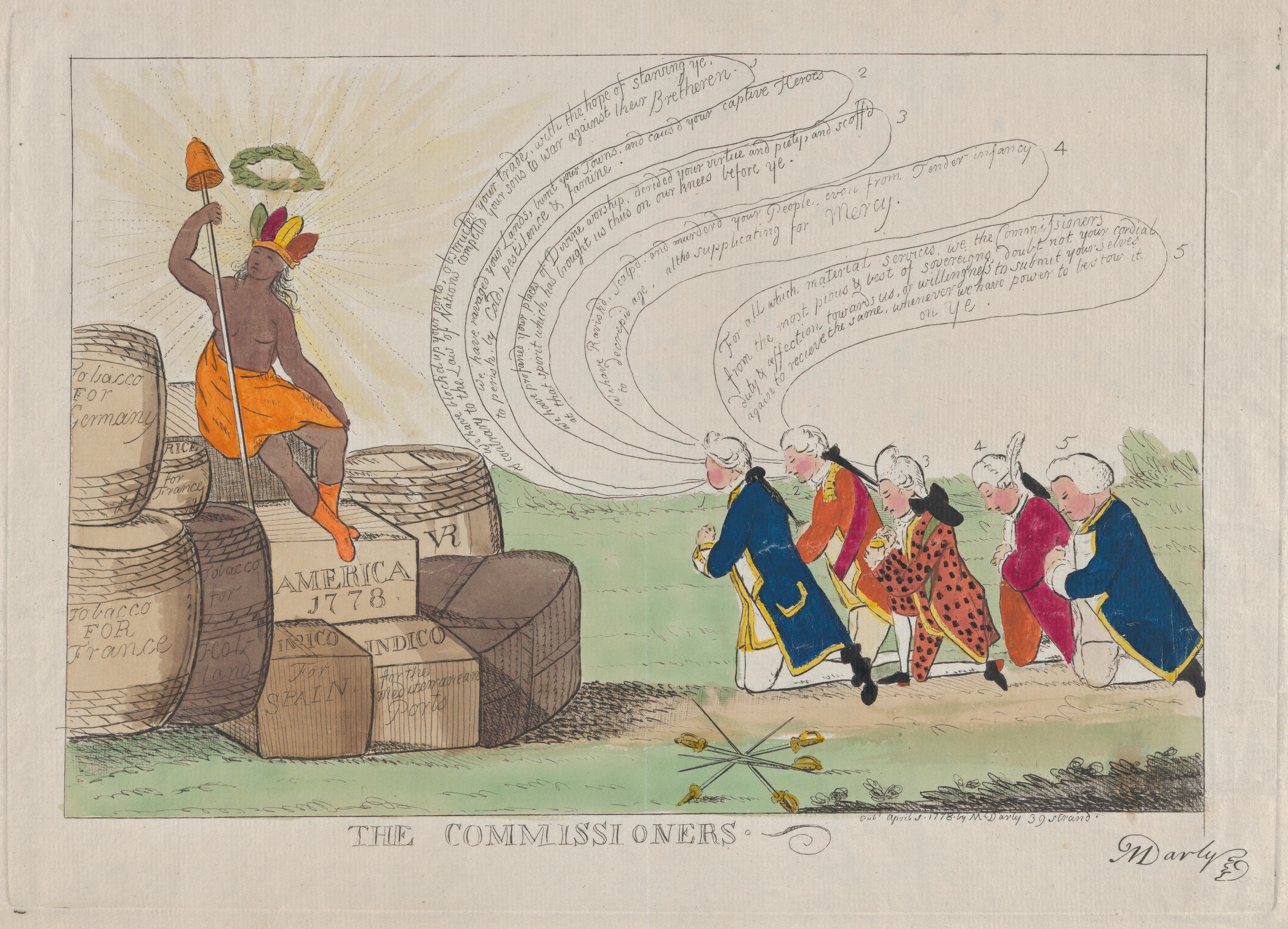
The Commissioners by Mary and Matthew Darly

The Carlisle Peace Commission was a group of British peace commissioners who were sent to North America in 1778 to negotiate terms with the rebellious Continental Congress during the American Revolutionary War. The commission carried an offer of self-rule, including parliamentary representation within the British Empire. The Second Continental Congress, aware that British troops were about to be withdrawn from Philadelphia, insisted on demanding full independence, which the commission was not authorised to grant.

The Peace Commission marked the first time that the British government formally agreed to negotiate with Congress. A previous informal attempt at negotiation, now known as the Staten Island Peace Conference, had taken place in 1776.

== Background ==
The first attempt at negotiation between Great Britain and the rebellious Thirteen Colonies after the outbreak in April 1775 of the American War of Independence took place in September 1776, when a committee from the Second Continental Congress agreed to meet with Admiral Lord Richard Howe, who had been given limited powers to treat with colonies individually. The limited authority given to both Howe and the American negotiators made it a virtual certainty that nothing would come of the meeting. The meeting was a failure, partly because Congress had recently declared independence from Britain, something that Howe was not authorised to recognise, and partly because the American commissioners had no substantive authority from Congress to negotiate.

After the British defeat at Saratoga in October 1777 and fearful of French recognition of American independence, the British prime minister, Lord North, had Parliament repeal such offensive measures as the Tea Act and the Massachusetts Government Act and sent a commission to seek a negotiated settlement with the Continental Congress.

The commission was empowered to offer a type of self-rule that Thomas Pownall had first proposed a decade earlier and later formed the foundation of British Dominion status. The fact that the commission was authorised to negotiate with the Continental Congress as a body also represented a change in official British government policy, which had been to treat only with the individual states.

The historian David Wilson is of the opinion that the war could have been avoided if the terms it proposed had been offered in 1775. The historian Peter Whiteley, however, notes that George III would have been unlikely to agree then to make such an offer.

== Commission ==
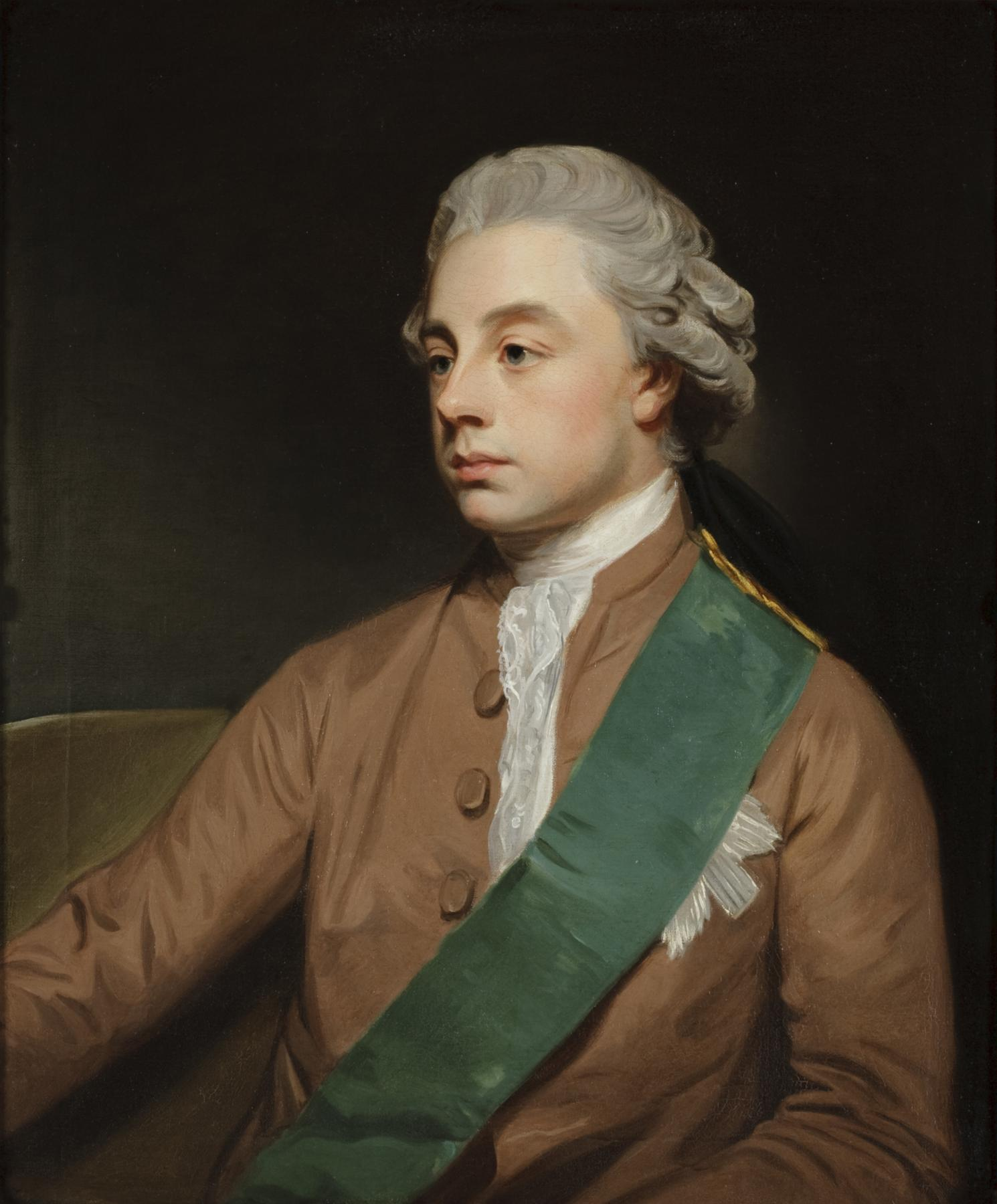
Frederick Howard, 5th Earl of Carlisle. A portrait by George Romney, 1780.

William Eden organized and served on the commission, but it was headed by the Earl of Carlisle and included George Johnstone, who had served as Governor of West Florida. Walpole remarked that Carlisle, then a young man, was "very fit to make a treaty that will not be made" and that he "was totally unacquainted with business and though not void of ambition, had but moderate parts and less application." Richard Jackson declined to serve after it became known that the United States and France had signed a Treaty of Alliance. The commissioners also learned of the Franco-American alliance before they set out in April.

One thing that the commissioners did not learn before their departure was that General Sir Henry Clinton had been ordered to evacuate Philadelphia even though his orders had been issued one month before they left. Carlisle was of the opinion that the administration had done so intentionally since they might not otherwise have gone at all. Carlisle wrote to his wife of the situation: "We all look grave, and perhaps we think we look wise. I fear nobody will think so when we return.... I don't see what we have to do here." Upon learning of the planned withdrawal, Carlisle appealed to Clinton to delay it, but in rejecting the appeal, Clinton cited his orders to act without delay. That prompted Carlisle to observe that the administration wanted the commission to be "a mixture of ridicule, nullity, and embarrassments." Eden was upset for not being told of Clinton's orders since the British intent to withdraw further stiffened American resolve.

On June 13, the commissioners sent a package of proposals to Congress, which was then holding sessions in York, Pennsylvania. Congress replied by insisting for American independence to be recognised or all British forces to withdraw first from the states, terms that the commission was not authorised to accept. The commission attempted to appeal to public opinion with warnings of widespread destruction but was unsuccessful. Johnstone tried to bribe some congressmen, and the Marquis de Lafayette challenged Carlisle to a duel over some anti-French statements that he had made.

Thomas Paine denounced the British proposals. Gouverneur Morris wrote several essays against the proposals. The commissioners circulated a manifesto, which was printed in the Hartford Courant on October 10, 1778. The Marquess of Rockingham, a leading opponent of the war, objected to the threats in the manifesto and moved to disavow it.

== Aftermath ==
Johnstone sailed to Britain in August, and the other commissioners returned in November 1778. The British, being unable to bring General George Washington's Continental Army to a decisive engagement, resumed the military campaign and turned to a southern strategy as their next attempt to win the war in North America. A further attempt in December 1780 to seek a diplomatic peace, in the form of the Clinton-Arbuthnot peace commission, failed, and there were no further substantive peace overtures until the American victory at Yorktown in 1781 and the eventual Treaty of Paris.

Along with being passed over for promotion and the money promised him from the British to capture West Point, the failure of that negotiation effort was a contributing cause for Benedict Arnold to switch over to the side of the British during the American Revolution.
