= Lafon County =

- County
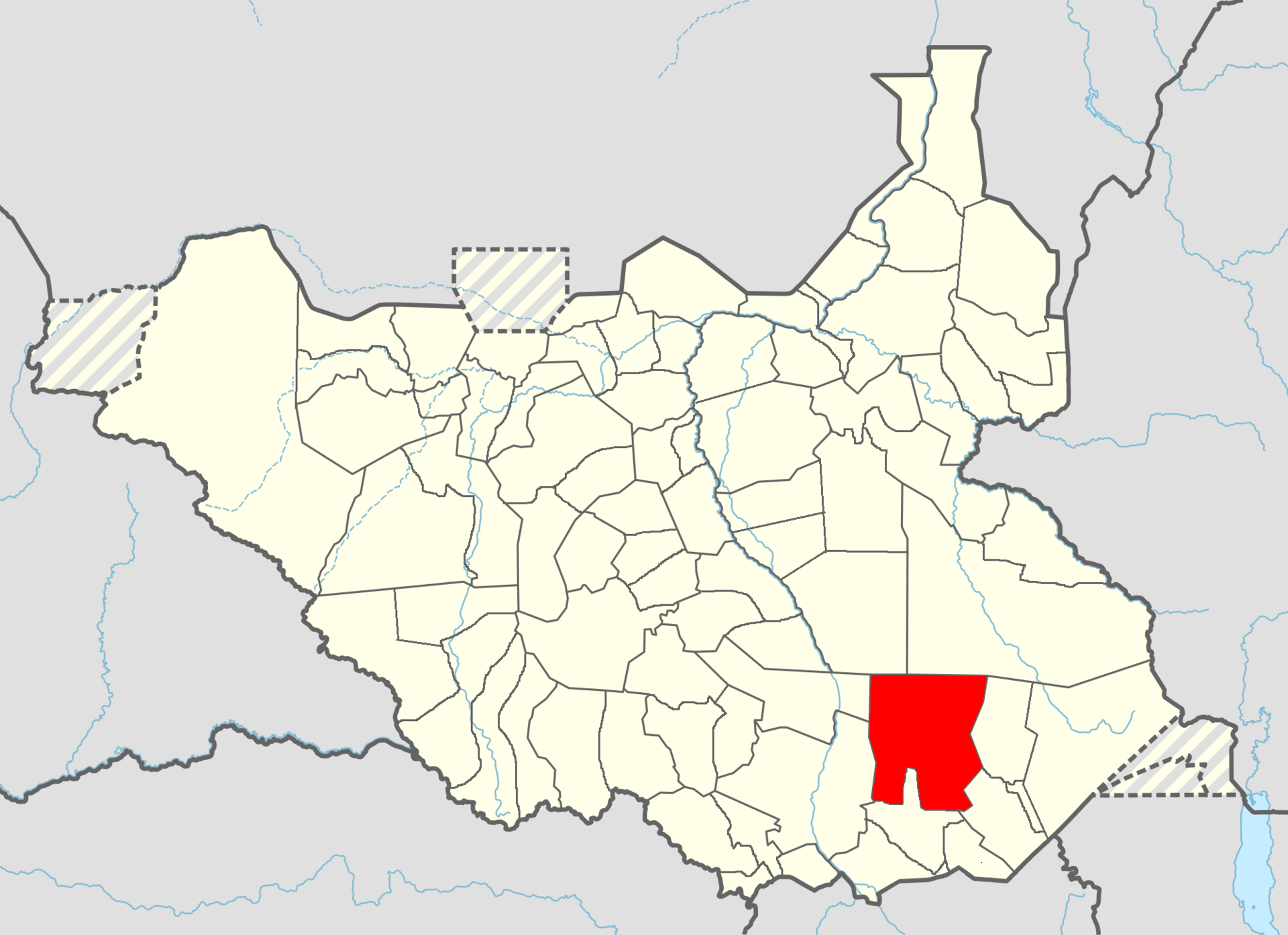
- Location in South Sudan
- Coordinates: 5°15′40″N 32°39′10″E
- Country: South Sudan
- Region: Equatoria
- State: Eastern Equatoria
- Headquarters: Lafon

Area
  - Total: 6,310 sq mi (16,330 km^{2})

Population (2017 estimate)
  - Total: 163,071
  - Density: 25.86/sq mi (9.986/km^{2})
- Time zone: UTC+2 (CAT)

Lafon is a county in Eastern Equatoria State of South Sudan. The largest town is Lopa.

== Economy. ==
As of 2007, most roads in the county were in poor conditions and movement was difficult in the rainy season. Water was shortage in the county due to lack of boreholes. Teachers and community health workers were not being paid. A household economy survey of three areas showed average daily cash income was at US$0.18 per person at Imehejek village, US$0.08 per person at Imotong village and US$0.16 per person at Hyala village. In November 2011 the Commissioner of Lopa County, Caesar Oromo Urbano, said most boreholes in the area had collapsed, and with no skilled technicians to repair them there was an immediate risk of an acute shortage of drinking water.

Most of the communities in Lopa County are farmers, and have a single cropping season. As of November 2009 they were facing severe food insecurity due to drought. Cattle rustling had increased as the people sought alternative food. There were no NGOs or UN agencies operating in the county. However, the Norwegian People's Aid NGO has since been active in implementing Basic Package of Health services (MDTF-BPHS) in Lopa county in a program funded by the World Bank and the Government of South Sudan. This included training and provision of communications and transport.

== People ==
The largest community is the Lopit people ethnic group. The second largest community is Pari people: Pari, followed by Tennet and Lotuko people respectively. As of May 2011 there was a dispute between the Lopit and Pari communities of Lafon County, with neither willing to accept a county commissioner from the other group. The Lopit preferred to have a commissioner and the Pari preferred two administrators. This forced Eastern Equatoria State Governor Louis Lobong Lojore to arbitrate the dispute by splitting the county into Imehejek and Lafon corridors in favor of peace. The governor said he was pushing to divide the counties in the state into smaller but more homogeneous counties.

== Administration ==
In March 2009 the state Governor, Brigadier General Aloisio Ojetuk Emor, announced that Lopa County had been officially renamed Lopa County in accordance with the wishes of the late SPLM leader, John Garang. He urged the communities to agree on their county headquarters. In April 2011 the United Nations Office for Project Services (UNOPS) – Sudan Operations Centre invited submission of sealed bids for construction of the Lopa County Headquarters.

Lopa county included many supporters of the National Congress. Despite this, in the January 2011 referendum Lopa was the only county in Eastern Equatoria that voted unanimously for separation. Referendum results for Lopa had 71,708 for secession and none for unity. 8 ballots were invalid and 29 blank.
