= Natisio Loluke =

Governor of Imatong State, South Sudan

Natisio Loluke has been the Governor of Imatong State, South Sudan since 24 December 2015. He is the first governor of the state, which was created by President Salva Kiir on 2 October 2015.
