= Magwi =

Magwi Magwe
- Town
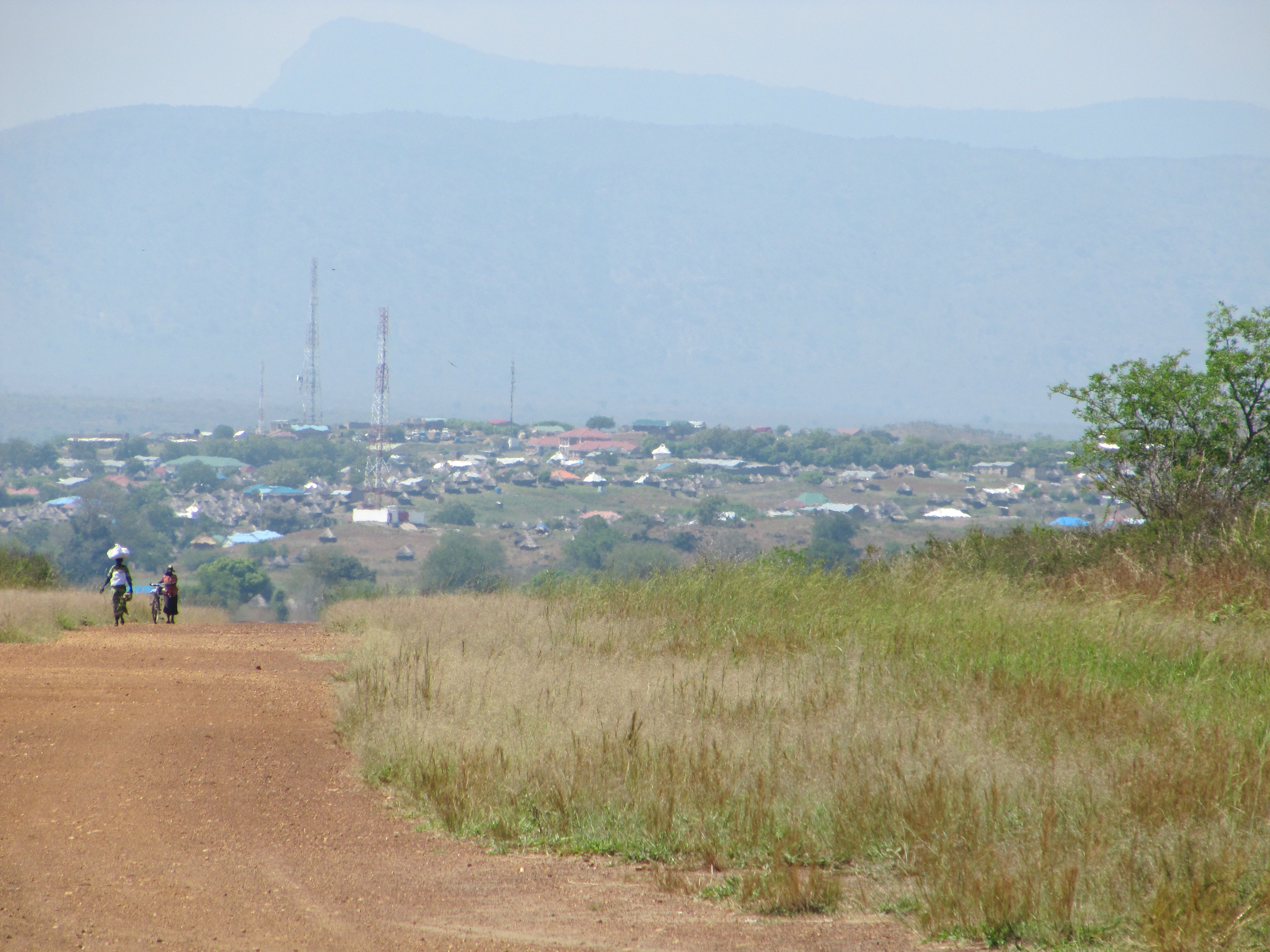
- Motto: Akuro mayenya
- Location in South Sudan; Location on Map is approximate
- Coordinates: 04°08′00″N 32°18′00″E
- Country: South Sudan
- Region: Equatoria
- State: Eastern Equatoria
- County: Magwi County

Population (2010 Estimate)
  - Total: 169,826
- Time zone: UTC+2 (CAT)

Magwi is a town in South Sudan. It is the capital, business center and home to the Acholi tribe of Magwi County in South Sudan.

== Location ==
The town is located in Magwi County, Eastern Equatoria in southern South Sudan, near the border with the Republic of Uganda. Magwi, where the county headquarters are located, lies approximately 82 kilometres (51 mi), northeast of Nimule, the largest town in the county. This location lies approximately 140 kilometres (87 mi), by road, southeast of Juba, the capital and largest city in the country. The coordinates of the town of Magwi are:4° 08' 0.00"N, 32° 18' 0.00"E (Latitude:4.1300; Longitude:32.300).

== Overview ==
Magwi is the headquarters of Magwi Payam, in which it lies. It is also the administrative capital of Magwi County. On 22 June 2011, construction began on the building that will house Magwi County Headquarters. The town is also home to the Rural Youth's Voices Project, a community-based youth radio station and music production studio. The station lets people in the community exchange information, opinions, and experience. Magwi Central Primary School, located in Magwi town, has eighteen (18) paid teachers and six (6) volunteers. The student body in 2010 was 1,157 boys and 847 girls. One hundred forty-nine (149) of the children were orphans. As of 2010 the school had no buildings but conducted classes under trees.

According to the Statistical Yearbook of South Sudan 2010, the population of Magwi is 41,778.

== Points of interest ==
The following points of interest are found in the town of Magwi:

- The offices of Magwi Town Council
- The headquarters of Magwi Payam
- The headquarters of Magwi County Administration
- Magwi Central Primary School
- Magwi College of Agribusiness
- Magwi Secondary School
- Leopoldo Anywar Secondary School
- Ayaa Secondary School
- Magwi primary school

== See also ==
- Eastern Equatoria
- Equatoria
