= Peace commission =

Organizations aiming to reduce, counter, or prevent conflict

A peace commission is an organization that operates at a local, regional, or national level within a country to reduce, counter, or prevent conflict. Typically, a peace commission will involve local communities and individuals in the peace building process. A Truth and reconciliation commission is a form of Peace Commission that discovers and reveals past wrongdoings in the hope of resolving conflict left over from the past. The South African Truth and Reconciliation Commission is an example. A commission such as the Southern Sudan Peace Commission is less concerned with the past, and more with finding ways to prevent ongoing ethnic violence from escalating, but instead to move towards a more peaceful society.

Another sense for the term is a commission that represents a country negotiating the terms of a peace during or immediately after a war.

== Peace promotion ==
Examples of peace commissions that promote the peace in unstable situations:

- Assessment and Evaluation Commission, a commission in the Republic of the Sudan that monitors and supports the implementation of the Comprehensive Peace Agreement
- Catholic Commission for Justice and Peace in Zimbabwe, established in 1972 to assist in cases of human rights abuse
- National Commission for Justice and Peace, formed in 1985 by the Pakistan Catholic Bishops’ Conference
- Peacebuilding Commission, established in December 2005 by the United Nations as an inter-governmental advisory body
- Southern Sudan Peace Commission, established in 2006 to promote peace among the people of South Sudan.

== Peace negotiation ==
Examples of peace commissions established to negotiate terms of peace:

- American Commission to Negotiate Peace, delegation from the United States that participated in the peace negotiations at the Treaty of Versailles in 1919
- Arbitration Commission of the Peace Conference on Yugoslavia, established in 1991 by the European Union
- Carlisle Peace Commission, a group of British negotiators who were sent to North America in 1778, during the American Revolutionary War
- Indian Peace Commission, established in 1867 to negotiate peace with Plains Indian tribes who were warring with the United States

== See also ==
- Truth and reconciliation commission
- President's Peace Commission
