= Lopit people =

Ethnic group in South Sudan

Lopit
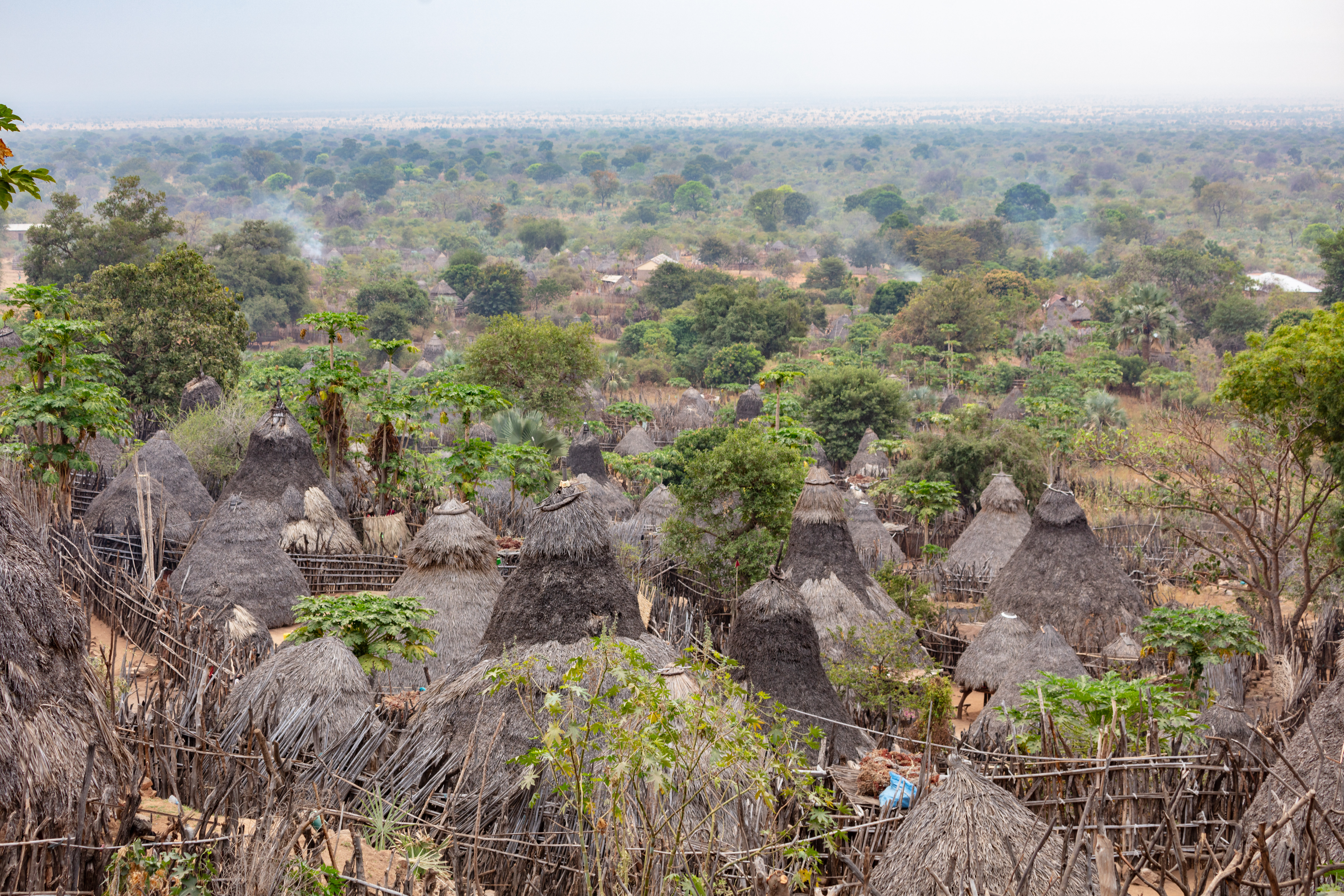
- Lopit village in Imehejek

Total population
- 160,000 to 200,000

Regions with significant populations
- South Sudan: 160,000 to 200,000

Languages
- Lopit language

Location of Lopit area in Southern Sudan

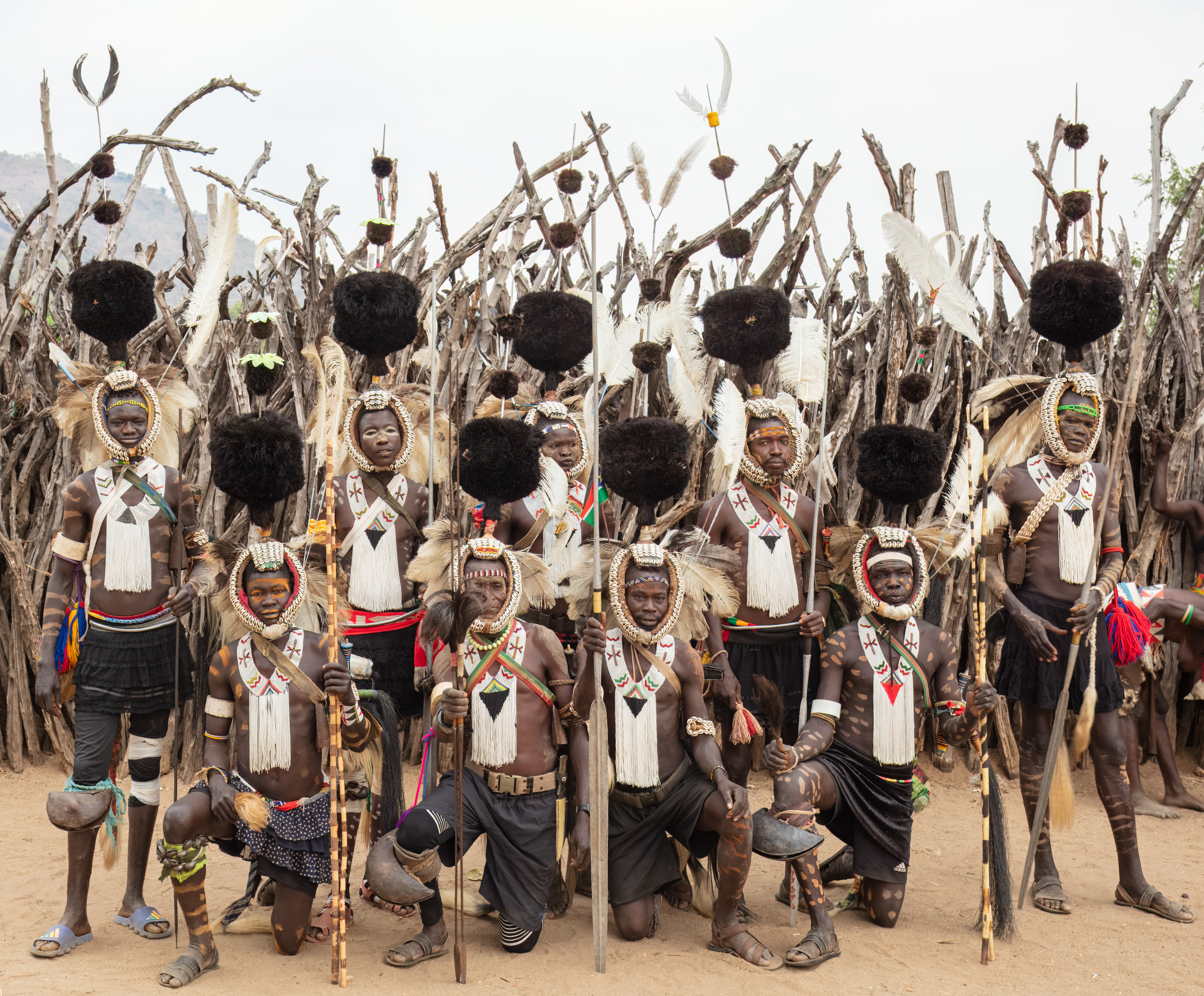
Tribu Lopit, Imehejek, Sudán

The Lopit people are a Nilotic ethnic group found in Eastern Equatoria State, South Sudan. Traditionally, they refer to themselves as donge (plural) or dongioni (singular). The Lopit number 160,000 to 200,000 people living in the Lopit area, in the Lopit mountains which extend from the east to the north of Torit.

The Lopit area borders Pari to the north, Tennet to the North and East, Bari to north-west, Lokoya and Otuho to the west, Otuho and Dongotono to the south, and Toposa and Boya to the east. Lopit comprises 55-57 villages. Imehejek is the headquarters of Lopa county and is located in the Lopit area. There are six payams (administrative areas) in the Lopit area: Imehejek (eastern / centre), Ohuthok and Obunge (south), Arilo (north), Bule and Ongiro (western).

== Language ==
The Lopit people speak the Lopit language, a Nilotic language which has six different dialects:

Ngabori: the Ngabori people are divided into sub villages:

Ngabori,

Lohomiling,

Loluro etc,

Dorik

They are divided into six villages

They include:

- Logonowati,
- Haba,
- Losaruk,
- Lobelo,
- Lodo and Lodohori.

Ngotira

Ngotira is the larger in Lopit land.

They are divided into two:

Eastern

They include: Ihirang, Imehejek, Mura, Hibirongi, Lohobohobo and Lohinyiang or Lehinyang.

Western

They are Loturumo (Lohiri or Lehiri), Maitong, Hiyahi, Losingia (Lesinya), Erube, Losou, Lodongiok, Idali, Tabwor1 and Tabwor

Omiaha

They include: Iboni, Ibahure, Ohilang, Ibele etc,

Lohutok

They are divided into Six villages

Lolongo

They are also divided into six villagers

== History ==
The Lopit came to Southern Sudan from East Africa, probably late migrants from Lake Turkana.

== Culture and tradition ==
=== Music and dance ===
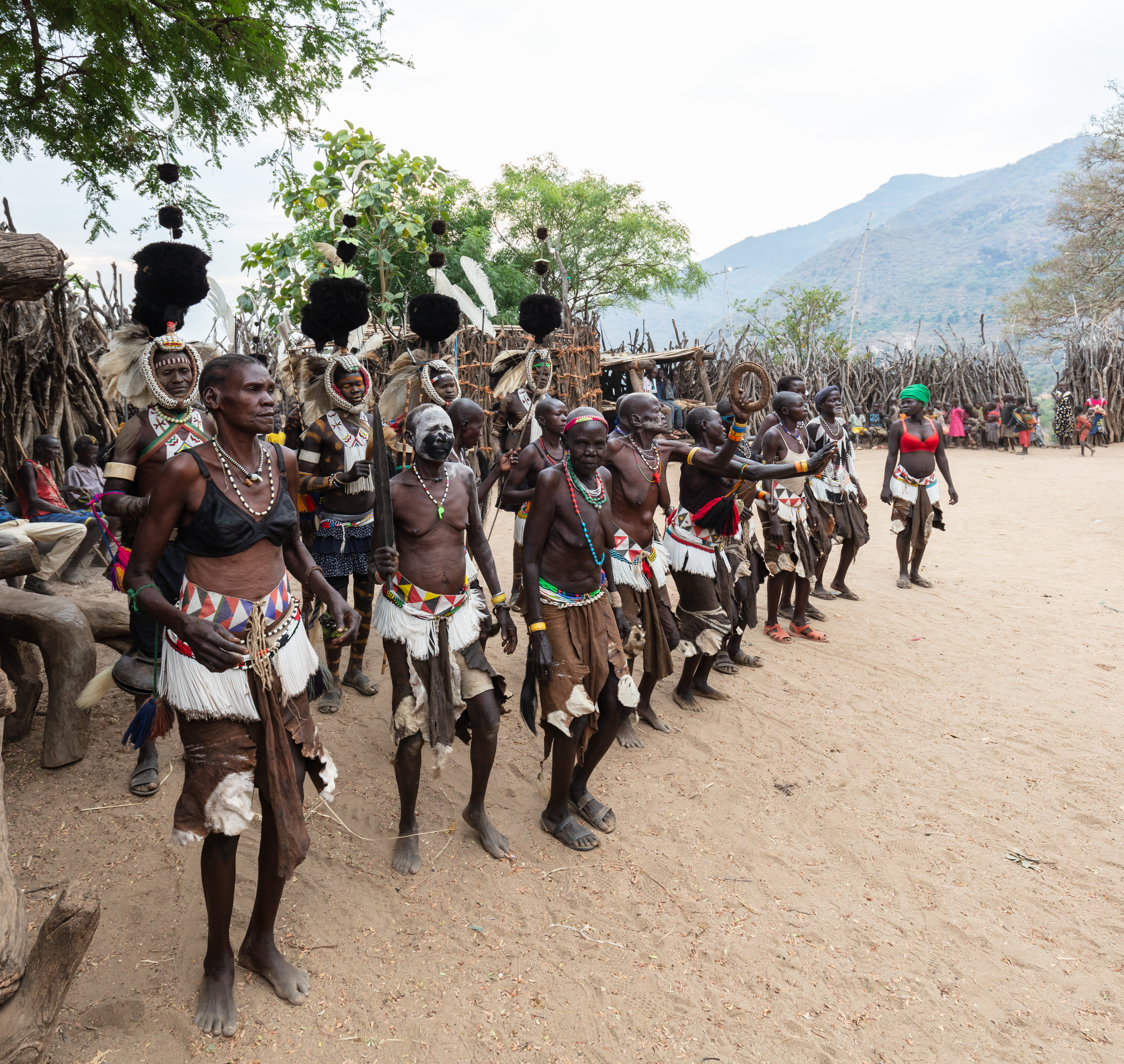
Dancing

Music and dancing are central to Lopit culture. There are different dances for different occasions. Each dance has specific costumes, music, at time allocations associated with it. Drums are an important part of the dances. Some main dances are:

- Bura - When someone passes away, the dancing happens for 24 hours, beginning with the women.
- Ikanga - A dance performed at the end of the harvest.
- Rongit - A celebratory dance performed on different occasions, by the ruling age set and the upcoming ruling age set. This is also part of a training process for the upcoming group.
- Hitobok - Performed when preparing for a war or fighting.
- The Miliang and Hatar - A celebratory dance performed when a lady has been betrothed from a different clan to a given clan, performed mainly at night till morning.
- Lam - Performed once a year around May, after a hunt that begins and night-time and ends the next morning. The hunt itself is a race between individual hunters, all of the kill is presented to the king.
- Liang - this is an afternoon dance between noon–1:00 pm before evening section dance. It varies between old and young deceased persons. for example, when a young person 20–30-years-old dies, people went hunting far from the village between 3–4:00 am and returned home 12 noon before Liang in mourning of the late person. Many things, e.g. animal meat, will be given to the home of the late to support the family and the visitors as well as a respect.
- Lotuhe - this is a dance performed only for an older person 50 and older and it takes place a night before (Bura) normally about 6 pm – 12 am depending on the season or the conditions of that certain villages. e.g. enough food, everyone is happy and any major sicknesses.
- Malia - this is a dance performed for young person ages between 18 and 35 or less than 50 years of age for all genders. malia take place between 6-12am. one drum is use only.
- ikitia (iitiyang) - this is a dance performs in afternoon about 2–3:00 pm just after Liang and is performed only by women.

== Social structure ==
=== Ruling age set ===
The monyomiji are the authorities and representatives of each village, and the most powerful people in the village. They make the important decisions about war, festivals, cultivation, and initiations. They are respected and obeyed, but are obliged to serve the community and previous generation of monyomiji. If they are seen to be making bad decisions or not following the rules, then this older generation of monyomiji may suspend them.

A great ceremony is held when the new generation of monyomiji takes over from the previous ruling age set. This transfer of power happens at regular intervals, ranging from 12 to 22 years depending on the location, unless there are exceptional circumstances.

When this happens, they are sometimes sent away from the village and expected to return with a valuable item to express their apology.

In central and Northern Lopit (Ngotira, Dorik, Ngabori), a new set of monyomiji is initiated every 12 years. There are two names which are alternatively used for this group: ngalam and lefirat.

In Southern Lopit, (Lomiaha, Lohutok, Lolongo, and 1 village from Ngotira), a new set of monyomiji is initiated every 22 years. The same name is used for each new set: hifira.

=== Girlhood ===
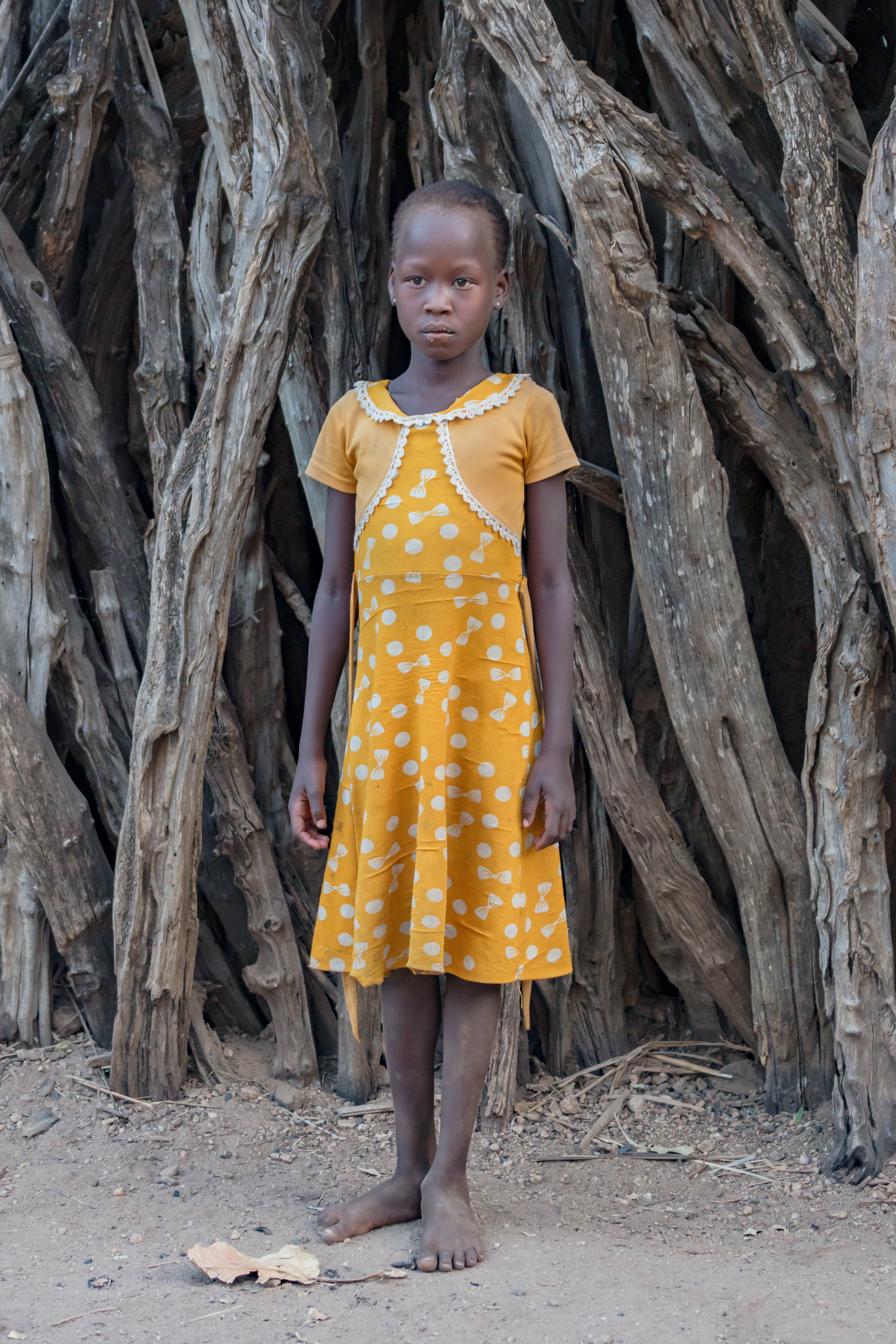
Lopit girl

From the age of 10–11, young girls begin preparing for initiation into girlhood. They begin to form associations amongst themselves, numbering from 3 up to 10–15. The groups of girls need to find a sleeping space to share in the house of an older woman. This older woman may be one of the girls' grandmothers, or a woman that is approached by a pair from the group who seek permission to stay in her house.

This time is for the girls to gain experience and knowledge of their expected duties as hodwo (adolescent girls). Each day they get up early (around 4am) to start grinding sorghum and other grains for their families. The old woman becomes a mentor to the girls, sharing advice with them in the mornings, as well as stories at night.

The formal initiation into hodwo takes place around the age of 14. An individual girl might be selected by the monyomiji for initiation, or a whole group might be initiated at the same time as the initiation of the new ruling age set (monyomiji).

Girls' duties as hodwo include:

- Being present when the monyomiji are dancing. (being absent for this occasion is severely punished)
- Clearing sticks and weeds from the monyomiji farm. (mana na gula / mana na habu)
- For new farms, clearing the land.
- Providing water to the monyomiji who work the farm.
- Preparing hanyima (peanut butter) in a calabash for the Ikanga festival, as well as an edible oil made from a native fruit.
- Run errands for the monyomiji together with the dure horwong / inyarhalu (young boys), such as collecting bamboo from the mountain (nyarat), particularly in Omiaha.

=== Womanhood ===
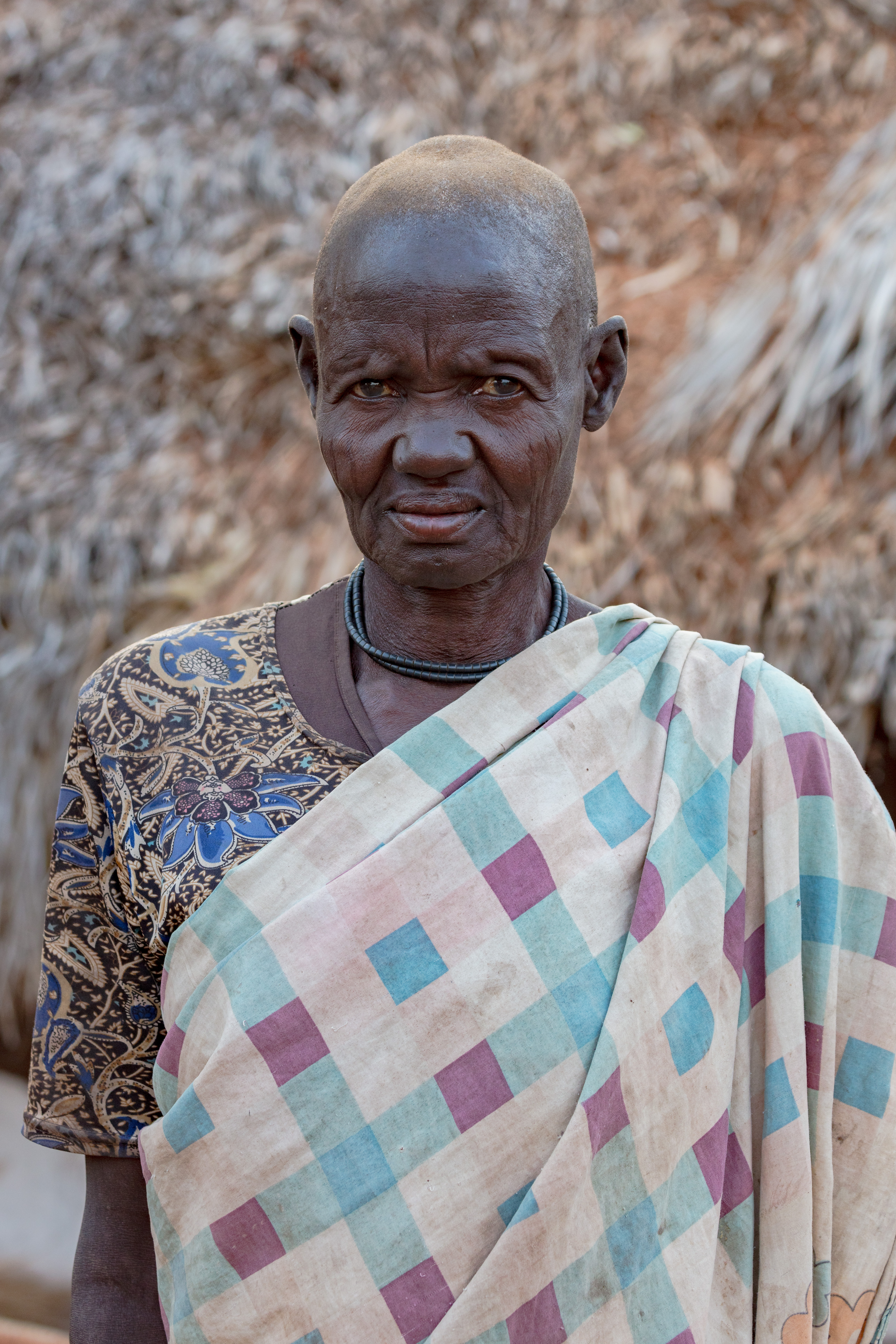
Lopit woman

Girls usually remain hodwo until they are married and have children. At this stage, they become honyomiji (women). Unmarried women may choose to join this group, or remain a hodwo for two more years.

Once girls have joined the honyomiji, they are the youngest set of women. It will be 30 years before they are initiated into the next set.

== Produce and economy ==
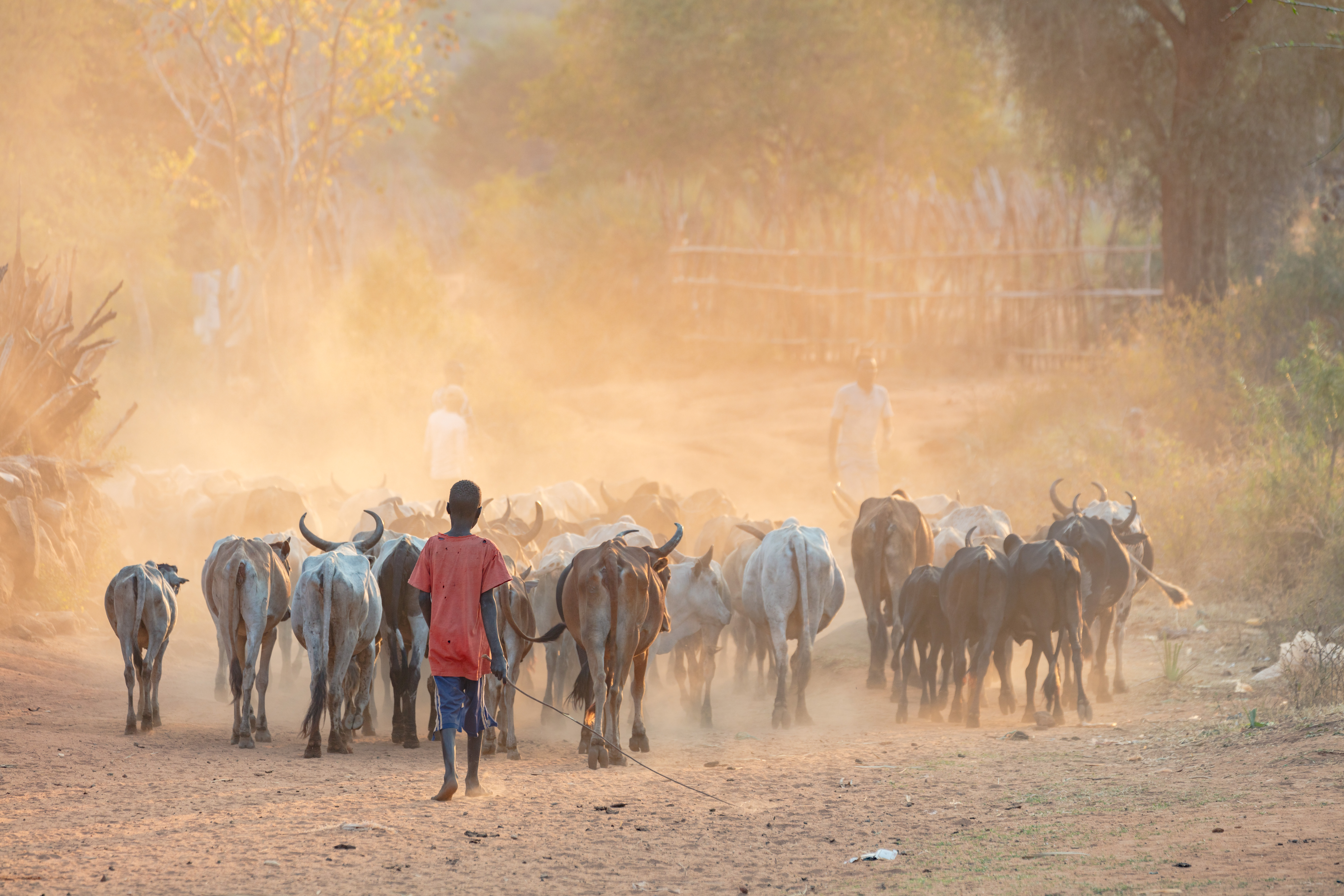
Cattle

The Lopit live in a hilly and fertile environment and are agro-pastoralists, practising traditional agriculture as well as livestock rearing. These socio-economic occupations are carried out both on the mountain slopes and in the plains.

The main crops are sorghum, bulrush, millet, pumpkin, ground nuts, simsim, okra, syam, cassava, sweet potato, maize and mango. They also harvest forest products, bamboo roots, coconuts, honey, shea nuts (pressed to make oil), figs, and many other sorts.

=== Hunting ===
The Lopit, like other groups in the area, practise extensive hunting. They hunt during the dry season, after the harvest (January – April) has ended. This time is for group hunting, when groups of up to 2,000 men team up to hunt game. Neighbouring villages team up to hunt in the land of the village that has called for the hunt. The call is put out four weeks in advance.

The groups split into two parts that proceed in different directions, and then the heads come together and regroup to cover a large area. The first animal killed in the hunt is given to the king of the land. When the meat is being divided up, elderly people have the first choice.

Some parts of the animal cannot be eaten freely. The internal organs (except for the lungs) can only be eaten by older men and women, whilst young people cannot eat any part of the head or lower legs of an animal.

Buffalo, elephant, giraffe, rhinoceros, gazelle, ostrich and antelope are usually hunted. Special hunts are organised for lions and leopards if they have killed livestock.

Fishing is practised from August to April, in swampy areas and lakes.
