= Daniel Awet Akot =

South Sudanese politician

Daniel Awet Akot دانيال أويت أكوت

former Deputy Speaker of the National Legislative Assembly
- President: Salva Kiir

Personal details
- Born: South Sudan
- Party: SPLM
- Nickname: Amara

Military service
- Allegiance: SPLA (Torit)
- Rank: High Command
- Commands: Bahr el Ghazal Independent Military Command

Daniel Awet Akot was the deputy Speaker of the National Legislative Assembly of the Republic of South Sudan.

== Early life ==
Akot was born in Lakes State in a Dinka family.

== Sudan People's Liberation Army ==
Akot graduated from the Sudan Military College. He received a year of additional military training in the United States before serving as a Lieutenant Colonel, commanding Sudan People's Liberation Army rebel forces around Renk in the northernmost tip of current-day South Sudan.

John Garang appointed Akot as one of the eleven alternate members of the SPLM/SPLA Political-Military High Command. Akot also became governor of Bahr el Ghazal and the overall commander of SPLA forces in that region. His deputy commanders included Bona Bang Dhol, Chol Ayuak Guiny and Deng Ajuong. His radio codename was Amara.
