= Pari people =

Ethnic group in South Sudan

The Pari (also spelled Paeri) are an ethnic group in South Sudan. They also call themselves Jo-Pari (people of Pari).

== History ==
Pari oral history says the people migrated from the north and west to Lafon County in Eastern Equatoria, where they lived in six villages at the foot of Lipul Hill (Jebel Lafon).

As well as growing crops such as sorghum and keeping cattle, goats and sheep, they hunted and fished.

The Pari might have previously occupied Bari territory. Bari oral history recounts that when they arrived in their present homeland from the north they found the Pari people there.

=== Modern history ===
The 1982 census put the total Pari population at approximately 11,000. When the Second Sudanese Civil War (1983-2005) began, many Pari joined the Sudan People's Liberation Army/Movement, and many were killed.

In February 1993 all six Pari villages were burnt down. The Pari were scattered and now live in various settlements.

== Culture ==
The multi-ethnic tribe speaks Päri, a Luo language, and practice Luo customs such as an age set system of social organization. Jwok is the local name for God. Most of the Pari belong to the Christian religion.

The pari community are basically divided into six sub-groups/villages. These include Wiatuo, Kor, Bura, Angulumere, Pugeri and Puchwa. They are practising cultural administration i.e age regimate termed as Mojo-miji. These takes place after every four years. One of the prominent leaders who led the county is Colonel Thomas Udwar Augustino. The county is currently found in Eastern Equatorial state. Hunting of wild animals especially during the dry season is becoming a hobby to the majority of teenage boys because of need to get money after a successful hunting.
