= Lokoya people =

The Lokoya are a Nilotic ethnic group who broke out from the Otuho people numbering about 30,000 people living in Central Equatoria and Eastern Equatoria, South Sudan.
