= Kapoeta State =

State of South Sudan from 2015 to 2020

- State
- Location of Kapoeta State in South Sudan
- Country: South Sudan
- Capital: Kapoeta
- Number of Counties: 4

Population (2014 Estimate)
  - Total: 504,720

Kapoeta State was a state in South Sudan that existed between 2 October 2015 and 22 February 2020. It was located in the Equatoria region and it bordered Imatong to the west, Boma to the north, Ethiopia to the east, and Kenya and Uganda to the south.

== History ==
On 2 October 2015, President Salva Kiir issued a decree establishing 28 states in place of the 10 constitutionally established states. The decree established the new states largely along ethnic lines. A number of opposition parties and civil society groups challenged the constitutionality of the decree. Kiir later resolved to take it to parliament for approval as a constitutional amendment. In November the South Sudanese parliament empowered President Kiir to create new states.

Luois Lobong Lojore was appointed Governor on 24 December.

== Geography ==
=== Administrative divisions ===
After the split up, Kapoeta State broke down even further for a total of 8 counties in the state (created in April 2016). The 8 counties are part of the 180 counties in South Sudan. The 8 counties are consisted of the following:

- Budi; headquarters: Chukudum
- Kapoeta East; headquarters: Narus
- Kapoeta North; headquarters: Nasikal or Riwoto
- Kapoeta South; headquarters: Kapoeta
- Kauto; headquarters: Nanyangacor
- Kimo (Timo); headquarters: Dongsike
- Kimotong; headquarters: Napak
- Ngauro; headquarters: Ngauro

The counties are further sub-divided into payams, and the payams are then further sub-divided into bomas.
