= Magwi County =

Coordinates: 04°00′N 32°18′E

Magwi
- County
- Interactive map of Magwi
- Country: South Sudan
- Region: Equatoria
- State: Central and Eastern Equatoria
- Seat: Magwi

Government
  - Commissioner: David Otto Ramson

Area
  - Total: 5,202 km^{2} (2,009 sq mi)

Population (2017 estimate)
  - Total: 260,634
  - Density: 50.10/km^{2} (129.8/sq mi)
- Time zone: UTC+2 (CAT)

Map of Eastern Equatoria - Magwi County in Bottom Left Corner

Magwi County, also Magwe County, is a county in Eastern Equatoria, South Sudan.

== Location ==
The county is located in Eastern Equatoria. It is bordered to the west and north by Juba County, by Torit County to the north east, by Ikotos County to the southeast and by the Republic of Uganda to the south. The county headquarters at Magwi, are located approximately 140 kilometres (87 mi), by road, southeast of Juba, the capital and largest city in the country. Towns include Nimule, Pageri, Magwi, Palotaka and Pajok.

== Overview ==
The county is one of the eight counties that constitute Eastern Equatoria State. The county borders one of South Sudan's most important trading partners; the Republic of Uganda. The White Nile enters the county near the town of Nimule, before flowing north along the county's eastern border. Magwi County is divided into three payams (Sudan)|payams (sub-counties): Magwi Payam, Pajok Payam and Iwire Payam. The town of Magwi is the county headquarters.

== History ==
Historically, the inhabitants of Magwi County are ethnic Acholi people; they constitute the smallest significant Acholi community outside of the Acholi sub-region in Northern Uganda.

During the Second Sudanese Civil War, the Sudanese government-aligned SPLA-United established a Magwi corridor, establishing lines of communication with the Lord's Resistance Army (LRA) of Uganda in early 1993. A counter-offensive by the Sudan People's Liberation Army in October 1995 recaptured the corridor. The county was severely adversely affected by the LRA insurgency, causing many to flee to neighboring counties, or to other countries, including Uganda, Kenya and the Democratic Republic of the Congo. Others took refugee near large urban centers in Sudan, such as Khartoum or South Sudan such as Juba and Nimule.

In January 2007, an Indian peacekeeper of the United Nations Mission in Sudan was killed by unknown assailants near the town of Magwi.

== Population ==
The 2008 Sudanese census estimated the population of Magwi county at approximately 169,830 Although these results were disputed by the South Sudanese authorities, they are the only recent figures available and form a basis on which newer studies can be based.

== See also ==
- Magwi
- Eastern Equatoria
- Equatoria
