= Kapoeta South County =

- County
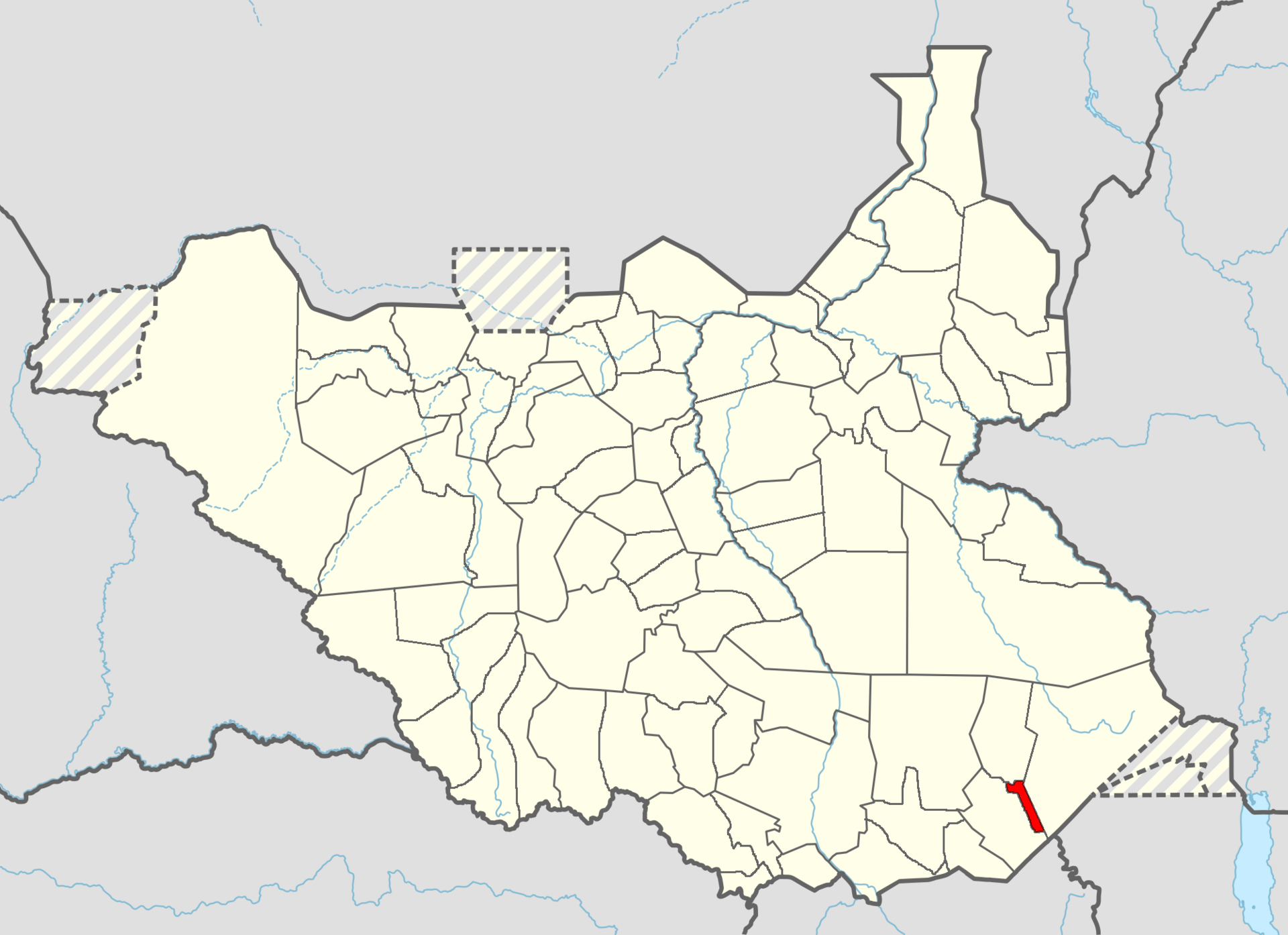
- Coordinates: 04°46′30″N 33°35′24″E
- Country: South Sudan
- Region: Equatoria
- State: Eastern Equatoria
- Headquarters: Kapoeta

Government
  - County Commissioner: Marko Lokitoe Lokuuta

Area
  - Total: 463 sq mi (1,199 km^{2})

Population (2017 estimate)
  - Total: 122,651
  - Density: 264.9/sq mi (102.3/km^{2})
- Time zone: UTC+2 (CAT)

Location within Eastern Equatoria (yellow)

Kapoeta South County is an administrative region in the Eastern Equatoria state of South Sudan. The county is bordered by Kapoeta North, Kapoeta East, and Budi counties. The county includes the Kapoeta Town, Machi and Namorunyang Payams. Its emblem features a ram with horns and slightly bent tail.

== History ==
During the Second Sudanese Civil War (1983-2005) the Sudanese Armed Forces laid a Barrier Minefield around the town of Kapoeta. In a ceremony in July 2007 the Mines Advisory Group (MAG) declared a section of this land 86,888 square metres (935,250 sq ft) in area free of mines and available for farming. MAG planned to continue mine clearance to provide access to grazing land and room for settlements.

In June 2008 the Ambassador of the Kingdom of the Netherlands officially opened the office of the SNV (Netherlands Development Organization) in a ceremony attended by State Governor Brigadier General Aloisio Ojetuk Emor. SNV is dedicated to improving the capabilities of local government. On 4 February 2011 the U.S. Consul General in Juba and Eastern Equatoria state Governor Louis Lobong Lojore formally opened an 894-kilowatt power plant in Kapoeta, built using funding from USAID.

== Healthcare ==
The Kapoeta Mission Hospital in Longeleya Payam was established immediately after the Sudan People's Liberation Army (SPLA) took control in June 2002. The hospital has an estimated catchment population of 490,000, growing fast with the influx of returnees and IDPs (Internally Displaced People) and other attracted to the town for work or trade.

== Transportation ==
The county is served by Kapoeta Airport, a small single-runway facility.
