= Boya people =

Surmic ethnic group

The Boya (also spelled Buya; called Larim and Langorim by the Didinga people) are a Surmic ethnic group numbering 20,000 to 25,000 people living in Budi County, part of the Greater Kapoeta region of the South Sudanese state of Eastern Equatoria.

The language of the Boya is the Surmic Narim language, related to that of the Didinga, Tenet and Murle in South Sudan. The people mostly live in the south and west Boya Hills, in the Mt. Kosodek and Mt. Lobuli areas. The main town is Kimatong, at the foot of the hills. They are agro-pastoralists, cultivating sorghum, maize, and beans, but mainly involved in livestock herding, hunting game and fishing.

== Notable people ==
- Lopez Lomong, an American track athlete and Olympian
- Peter Lomong, track athlete
