= Otuho people =

Ethnic group

Otuho
Total population
- 500,000–700,000

Regions with significant populations
- South Sudan

Languages
- Lotuko, English

Religion
- Christianity, Traditional African religion

Related ethnic groups
- Other Nilotic peoples

The Otuho people, also known as the Lotuko, are a Nilotic ethnic group whose traditional home is the Eastern Equatoria state of South Sudan. They speak the Otuho language.

== Demographics ==
The Otuho are bordered by the Lopit in the North, the Bari on the West, the Acholi and the Madi in the South west, and the Didinga and the Boya in the East. Their region is characterized by ranges and mountain spurs such as the Imatong mountain, the highest mountain in South Sudan with an altitude of 10,453 feet above sea level.

== Subsistence ==
They engage in subsistence agriculture; their main crops are sorghum, ground nuts, simsim (sesame), and maize in the plains, or telebun, dukhn, sweet potatoes, and tobacco in the hills.

Land is owned by no single person, but in trust by the community. In the mountains, after finding a site, the group decides the boundaries of each person's garden, with certain areas being fallow (for up to 10 years) and others open to cultivation (for up to 4 years).

== Religion ==
Their primary religion is an ethnic religion based on nature and ancestor worship that is deeply rooted in their ethnic identity; conversion to another religion essentially equates to cultural assimilation. The chief god of the Otuho is called Ajok; he is generally seen as kind and benevolent, but can be angered. In Otuho mythology he once answered a woman's prayer for the resurrection of her son. Her husband, however, was angry and re-killed the child. Ajok was annoyed by his actions and swore never to resurrect any Otuho again, and in this manner, death was said to have become permanent.

In The Golden Bough written by James Frazer, it was recorded that Latuka people would attack the king at night, rob him, drive him away or even kill him if the crops fail, and all his efforts to draw down rain have proved fruitless.
