= Tennet people =

Ethnic group in South Sudan

The Tennet people (referred to as "Tennet" in early language studies [1]) are South Sudanese. Their language is sometimes referred to as Ngaarit. Tennet traditional dances are divided into the following categories: Lalu, Nyaliliya, Loduk, and so on

The majority of the Tennets are reported to be bilingual. They speak the languages of the neighbouring communities. They are bordered by Lopit to the east and west, Pari to the northwest, Greater Pibor and Bor to the north, and Toposa and Laarim to the northeast. They have, nevertheless, maintained a strong ethnic identity and resisted absorption by neighbouring communities by conserving their culture and language. They are still using Tennet.

== Location ==
Eastern Equatoria State – North of Torit, just south of Lafon

The Tennet live in Eastern Equatoria State, in the hills north of the town Torit, in the northern part of the hills. Their main administrative area is Arilo payam of Lafon County.

According to linguistic/ethnographic data, the Tennet home area comprises about 14–15 villages. Here are the commonly listed Tennet villages: Imilwanit, Ngaalovi, Itir, Nyaaro, Leteji, Ngaanlobok, Loudum, Le̱le̱, Lovi, Tare, Lobele, Imedu, Momoi and Lovirang

The “major town/village” for the Tennet is listed as Arilo. Some sources (depending on date) mention a smaller subset of villages (e.g. six) — likely reflecting migration, consolidation or different reporting periods.

The Tennet territory is roughly 65 km northeast of Torit, in the hills. On a map of Eastern Equatoria, this places them in the northern‑hills region of the state, south (or just south) of Lafon County’s border.

Their neighbors include other ethnic groups and the Tennet live somewhat “on the edge”: historically, they are considered a small Surmic group in an area surrounded by Nilotic‑speaking neighbors.

== Early history ==
The ancient history of the Tennet people is closely linked to the broader history of southern Sudan. In particular, the Tennet have an account of how they were once part of a larger group, which is now known as Murle, Didinga, and Laarim (Boya), and the other members of the Southwest Surmic language family.

The ancient history linked that these members of a hunting party speared an oribi, but after cooking it, they drank the broth themselves instead of giving it to the elders according to custom. And because of that, a disagreement arose, and in the end, they separated, splitting into four smaller groups.

Tennet people experienced periods of conflict and displacement, often due to political instability and violence in the region. Despite these challenges, the Tennet have been resilient and have continued to maintain their cultural identity.

On the other hand, the ancient history of the Tennet people states that Tennet learned iron working from the Bari people, and during Sudan's civil wars, blacksmith activity decreased.

== Language ==
Tennet is a Nilo-Saharan, Eastern Sudanic, Surmic language. It has several of the features common in other Surmic languages: Implosive consonants, multiple strategies for marking numbers on nouns, a marked nominative case system, and VSO order but sentence-final question words.

== Culture ==
=== Economy ===
The Tennet people practice swidden agriculture. They grow sorghum mostly on the plains below the villages, but they also cultivate fields on the mountainsides. They raise cattle, which are the main measure of wealth and are used for bride wealth, and they also hunt, fish, and raise goats and sheep. However, they are primarily dependent on sorghum, and drought can cause severe food shortages.

=== Governance ===
The Tennet communities are governed by the ruling age set, called the Machigi Looch, (this word means the rulers and the owners of the land). The Members of the Machigi Looch are young men who are old enough to participate in warfare (cattle raiding and defence of the village). They make decisions, but they are also held accountable by the retired Machigi Looch, the elders. A new group of Machigi Looch is initiated about every twelve years.

=== Music ===
Tennet music is pentatonic which is "Rugumon". Carved flutes are common around the villages, and drums are used during dances.

== Bibliography ==
- Arensen, Jonathan E. 1992. Mice are men: Language and society among the Murle of Sudan. International Museum of Cultures Publication, 27. Dallas: International Museum of Cultures.
- Arensen, Jonathan, Nicky de Jong, Scott Randal, Peter Unseth. 1997. "Interrogatives in Surmic Languages and Greenberg's Universals," Occasional Papers in the Study of Sudanese Languages 7:71–90. Nairobi: Summer Institute of Linguistics.
- Arensen, Jonathan E. 1998. "Murle categorization" in Gerrit Dimmendaal and Marco Last (eds.), Surmic Languages and Cultures. 181–218. Köln: Rüdiger Köppe Verlag.
- Dimmendaal, Gerrit. 1989. "On Language Death in Eastern Africa", in Dorian, Nancy C. (ed.), Investigating obsolescence: Studies in language contraction and death (Studies in the Social and Cultural Foundations of Language 7.) Cambridge: Cambridge University Press
- Randal, Scott. 1995. "Nominal morphology in Tennet," M.A. thesis, the University of Texas at Arlington.
- Randal, Scott. 2000. "Tennet's ergative origins," Occasional papers in the study of Sudanese languages. 8:67-80. Nairobi: Summer Institute of Linguistics.
- Tucker, Archibald N. & Margaret A. Bryan. 1956. The non-Bantu languages of northeastern Africa. "Handbook of African languages, 3." London: Oxford University Press for International African Institute.
