= Eastern Equatoria =

State of South Sudan

- State
- Eastern Equatoria State
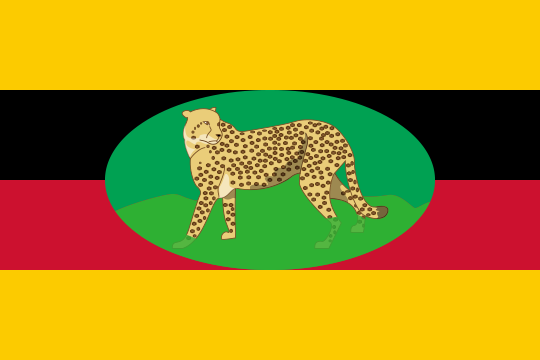
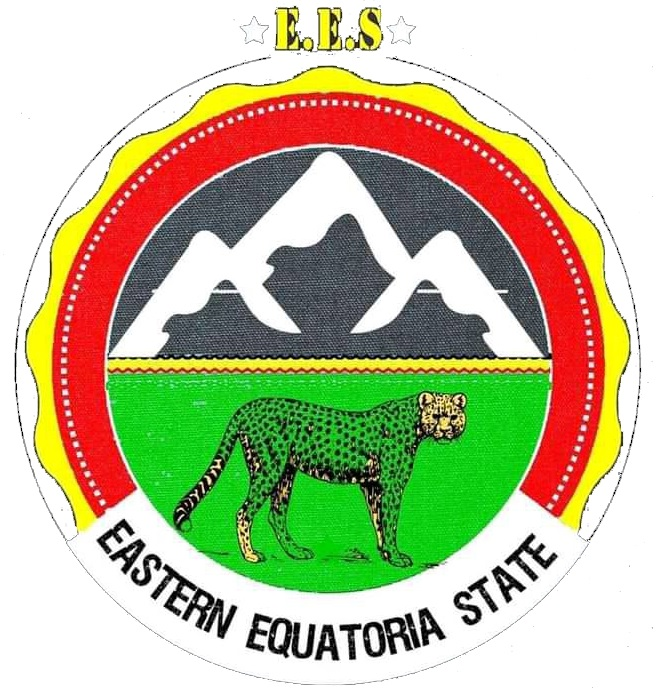
- Flag Seal

- Location in South Sudan Eastern Equatoria owned by South Sudan Disputed areas
- Coordinates: 04°45′N 33°11′E
- Country: South Sudan
- Region: Equatoria
- No. of counties: 8
- Capital: Torit

Government
  - Type: Government
  - Governor: Louis Lobong Lojore

Area
  - Total: 73,472.01 km^{2} (28,367.70 sq mi)

Population (2017 estimate)
  - Total: 1,393,765
  - Density: 18.97001/km^{2} (49.13211/sq mi)
- Time zone: UTC+2 (CAT)
- HDI (2021): 0.371 low · 5th of 10

Eastern Equatoria is a state in South Sudan. It has an area of 73,472 km^{2}. The capital city is Torit. On 1 October 1972, the state was divided into Imatong and Namorunyang states and was re-established by a peace agreement signed on 22 February 2020.

Louis Lobong Lojore is the current governor of Eastern Equatoria.

== Geography ==
The state shares international borders with Uganda in the south, with Kenya in the south-east and with Ethiopia in the north-east. Domestically, it is bordered by Central Equatoria in the west and Jonglei in the north. The Ilemi Triangle in the east, between Eastern Equatoria and Lake Turkana, is or has been disputed among all three abutting states (South Sudan, Kenya and Ethiopia).

== Population ==
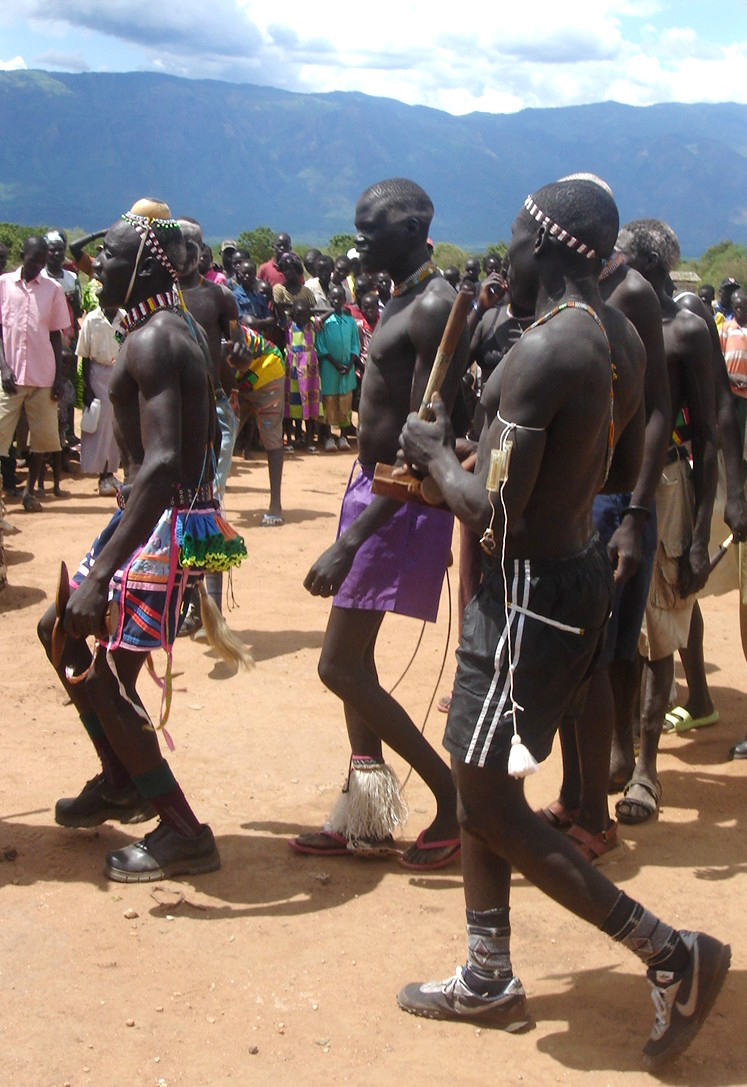
Peace agreement dancers in Kapoeta, Eastern Equatoria

The state is estimated to have a population of 1,393,765 (32/sq mi). Eastern Equatoria state was home to several different ethnic groups. The Toposa, Jiye/Jie and Nyangathom live in the Kapeota counties in the east of the state. The Didinga, Dodoth and Boya live in Budi county around Chukudum. Further west, Lopa, Torit and Ikwoto counties are inhabited by the Ketebo, Otuho, Mokoyi Lopit, Lango, Pari, and Tenet people who inhabit a portion of the lopit hills after they split from Didinga and Murle early in the 19th century and Lokoya of Lowoi. The Acholi, Madi, Iwire and Ofiriha people live in the westernmost Magwi county.

Most of the inhabitants of Eastern Equatoria live by subsistence farming, and also raise cattle, sheep and goats. Some of the crops are sold, while most are consumed locally. The Didinga Hills in Budi county have rich and fertile soil that is used for cultivation of tobacco, potatoes, maize, and Dura.

== Government ==
The executive head of the State was the Governor, who was elected. The Governor was appointing ministers, advisors, and the Executive Directors to the Counties. The Counties in turn, were ruled by the democratically elected Local Government Councils headed by the County Commissioner The state legislature was elected, with the first elections being held in April 2010.

== Administrative divisions ==

Eastern Equatoria, like other states in South Sudan, was sub-divided into counties. These were further divided into Payams, then Bomas. Each county was headed by a County Commissioner, elected by the people of a County as the head of the local government in the County.

Counties were originally larger, but were subdivided in part to ensure that the different communities have full representation. Thus Torit County was subdivided into Torit, Lopa and Ikwotos counties, and Greater Kapoeta was divided into Budi County and Kapoeta county, which in turn was divided into Kapoeta North, South and East counties.

Counties as of 2020 were:

- Budi County
- Ikotos County
- Kapoeta East County
- Kapoeta North County
- Kapoeta South County
- Lafon County
- Magwi County
- Torit County

== Health ==
As of 2014, this was one of the last areas in the world where cases of Guinea worm disease are found, with twelve of the 17 reported cases occurring "in one small pocket of Eastern Equatoria State," according to NPR.

== Governors ==
Tenure	Governor
Feb 1994 - Jun 1994	Caesar Paia
Jun 1994 - Nov 1994	Marboz Konda
Jun 1994 - Dec 1997	Caesar Paia
Dec 1997 - Jan 2000	Abdullah Amiri
Jan 2000 - Feb 2001	Abdullah Allajabo
Feb 2001 - 2005	Caesar Baya Lolaya
18 Jul 2005 - 30 Sep 2005	Daniel Awit Akot (acting)
30 Sep 2005 - 24 Feb 2010	Aloisio Emor Ojetuk
24 Feb 2010 - 20 May 2010	Johnson Juma Okot
20 May 2010 - 9 Jul 2011	Louis Lobong
9 Jul 2011 — 9 Jul 2019	Johnson Juma Okot
Jul 2019 — May 2020	Louis Lobong Lojore
Jun 2020–Present	Louis Lobong Lojore

== Economy ==
Eastern Equatoria is the most mountainous state in South Sudan. People entirely depend on agriculture and livestock keeping. Whenever there's climate change, people in those areas are least likely to be affected.

In November 2026, the United Nations Mission in South Sudan (UNMISS) reported worsening drought conditions in Eastern Equatoria, particularly around Imehejek, forcing herders to migrate.

== See also ==
- Government of Eastern Equatoria from 2010
- Government of Eastern Equatoria 2005–2010
- Equatoria
  - Central Equatoria
  - Western Equatoria
