= Torit =

City in South Sudan

Torit Torit توريت Hatiha
- City
- Nickname: Wok leheyek
- Location in South Sudan
- Coordinates: 04°24′29″N 32°34′30″E
- Country: South Sudan
- Region: Equatoria
- State: Eastern Equatoria
- County: Torit County
- Municipality: 19 August 2013

Government
  - Mayor: Joseph Aye Joseph Oswaha
- Elevation: 615 m (2,018 ft)

Population (2008 Estimate)
  - Total: 33,657
- Time zone: UTC+2 (CAT)

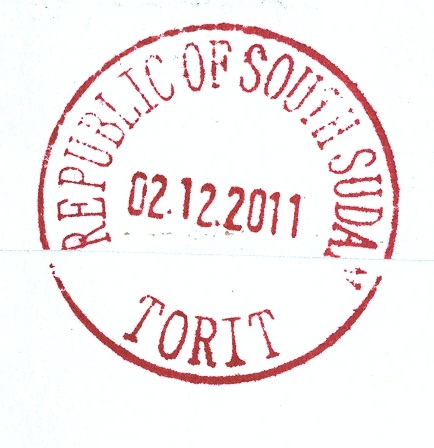
A 2011 Torit postmark showing the new style of South Sudanese postmarks.

Torit is a city in South Sudan that is the headquarters of Torit County in Eastern Equatoria State. The Equitoria Corps mutinied in Torit after independence rather than be removed to Khartoum and Arab control, starting the first civil war in Sudan. On August 18, 1955, the Torit mutiny began in Eastern Equatoria.

== History ==
On 18 August 1955, the Equatoria Corps mutinied at Torit, starting the First Sudanese Civil War. In 1964 the military government in Khartoum closed "all the Christian mission schools" in the area.

Torit was upgraded to Municipality status administered by a mayor on August 19, 2013 and the first mayor of Torit municipality was His Worship Ustaz, Stephen Osfaldo Lobali.

== Location ==
The city is in Torit County in Eastern Equatoria State, in the southeastern part of South Sudan, close to the international border with the Republic of Uganda. It is approximately 150 kilometres (93 mi) east of Juba, the capital and largest city in South Sudan, by road. The coordinates of Torit are: 4° 24' 28.80"N, 32° 34' 30.00"E (Latitude:4.4080; Longitude:32.5750).

== Population ==
The population of Torit was last estimated at 20,050, in 2004, and, according to census results, 33,657 in 2008.

== Education ==
Equatoria International University temporarily opened in Torit on 21 June 2019, although the university is building a permanent site south of the city.

== Points of interest ==
The following points of interest are found in Torit:

- Fr Saturlino Ohure Mausoleum
- The offices of Torit Town Council
- The headquarters of Torit County
- The headquarters of Eastern Equatoria State
- Dr John Garang Memorial Secondary School
- Torit Day Secondary School
- Torit East Primary School
- Torit Hospital
- Torit State Hospital
- The Juba-Lokichogio Road – The road, which is the primary land route to and from Kenya, passes through Torit
- Torit Airport – A small civilian airport
- Lomoliha Market – The central market for the town.
- Johnson Akio Secondary School
- Fr. Saturlino Ohure Secondary School

== See also ==
- Torit Airport
- Eastern Equatoria
- Equatoria
- Diocese of Torit
