= Loyoro, South Sudan =

Loyoro
- Village
- Location in South Sudan
- Coordinates: 4.834204°N 34.423149°E
- Country: South Sudan
- Region: Equatoria
- State: Eastern Equatoria
- County: Kapoeta East County
- Payam: Narus
  - Summer (DST): +3GMT

Loyoro is a community in Eastern Equatoria state of South Sudan, about 50 kilometres (31 mi) as the crow flies to the north east of Narus. It lies on the Loyoro River. Loyoro is part of the Narus parish of the Catholic Diocese of Torit.

According to their tradition, the ancestors of the Toposa people settled at Losilang in what is now northern Uganda for a while, then drifted north in search of grazing. At Loyoro one group, the Nyangatom or Dongiro, went east, while the Mosingo and Kor sections of the Toposa, under pressure from the Turkana, moved west and had settled in Kapoeta by 1830.

During the Second Sudanese Civil War (1983-2005) many of the people of the community fled, returning after signature of the Comprehensive Peace Agreement. Per the University of Maryland's Global Terrorism Database, the Loyoro were the subject of an attack by the Sudan's Peoples Liberation Army on April 15, 2002, in which 24 community members were killed and 15 injured. As of 2004, the Catholic Diocese of Torit was operating a center at Loyoro serving the displaced. The people later had difficulty gaining funding for reconstruction since they did not count as refugees or Internally Displaced People.
