= Kuron peace village =

Holy Trinity peace village Kuron peace village
- Intentional community
- Location within South Sudan
- Coordinates: 5°41′47.4″N 34°33′49.8″E
- Country: South Sudan
- Region: Equatoria
- State: Eastern Equatoria
- County: Kapoeta East County
- Payam: Kauto Payam
- Established: 2005
- Founder: Paride Taban

Kuron peace village (officially Holy Trinity peace village) is an intentional community founded by emeritus bishop Paride Taban in Kuron, South Sudan, in 2005. It is situated in Kapoeta East County, Namorunyang State, on the southeast border of South Sudan, roughly 190 km from Narus and 75 km from Boma. The area is mainly inhabited by the Toposa ethnic community of the Ateker ethnic cluster. Kuron peace village is situated near the Kuron river and close to the northern state boundary with Boma state. Its headquarters are based in Nanyangachor near the Ethiopian Highlands. the main aim of establishing the village was to have a village without tribalism

Kuron peace village has been significant in conducting peace events. In 2013 it hosted a Peace Day organized by UNMISS. In 2016 seventeen traditional leaders from different parts of South Sudan gathered in Kuron to discuss the roles of customary authority in governance and their contribution to peace.
