= Peter Lorot =

Peter Lorot is a former officer who served with the Sudan People's Liberation Army (SPLA) during the Second Sudanese Civil War (1983-2005). He broke away from the SPLA in 1999 with a Didinga force based on Chukudum, in Budi County of Eastern Equatoria State in South Sudan. In the resulting conflict many people were displaced. As of April 2011 Lorot's forces were still not reconciled with the de facto SPLM government.

== Civil war ==
In 1999 there was extreme tension in Chukudum between the Dinka-led military authorities and the Didinga people, fueled by a history of humiliation, harassment and violence since the SPLA moved into the region in 1985. When a Dinka was promoted in place of Lorot, he and several supporters assassinated the Dinka officer and took to the woods. In September 2000 Non-Government Organization (NGO) personnel were evacuated from the area due to concerns that conflict might erupt between Lorot's forces and the SPLA. The next month Lorot attacked SPLA forces around Chukudum. Since the SPLA had followed a policy of integrating people of different communities into their forces, the SPLA troops attacked by Lorot were Didinga and Toposa people, rather than the Dinka people against whom Lorot was hostile. A report of the fighting said Lorot seemed to be supported by the government of Sudan.

In May 2001 the Danish pilot of an ICRC plane was killed while flying over the region. The plane had been forced to descend briefly to 2,000 metres (6,600 ft) for technical reasons, and had just climbed back to its assigned altitude. An SPLM spokesman said the SPLA had no forces in the area, and "therefore puts the blame squarely on the government of Sudan and its allied militias", including Lorot's group among these. The government in Khartoum had accused the SPLA of involvement, but the SPLM said the Sudan Armed Forces (SAF) controlled Kapoeta town and was responsible for the incident because it directed Lorot's operations. According to an SPLM spokesman the incident occurred west of the Didinga Hills, about 65 km (40 mi) south of Kapoeta, over territory that was mostly controlled by pro-government militias led by Captain Peter Lorot.

The fighting with Lorot's forces displaced about 16,800 people from Chukudum to nearby villages in the highlands. The "Chukudom Crisis" was resolved in August 2002 during a Peace Conference organized by the New Sudan Council of Churches. During the crisis, landmines were sown in the fields around Chukudum.

== Post-war ==
The civil war ended in 2005. In February 2006 Brigadier General Aloisio Emor Ojetuk, Governor of Eastern Equatoria, said about 359 men from Lorot's force had joined the SPLA and were receiving training. An attempt by the SPLA in June 2006 to disarm Lorot's militia was ignored, with the group threatening to start fighting again. In July 2006, the first Vice President of the Government of National Unity of Sudan and President of Southern Sudan, Salva Kiir, called for unity in South Sudan. He described Lorot as being among those who had not yet made up their minds about which side they wanted to support. In April 2011, renewed fighting between Lorot's tribal militia and SPLA forces was said to have resulted in several deaths and massive displacement of civilians.
