= Lolim =

- Village
- Location in South Sudan
- Coordinates: 4.587141°N 33.991342°E
- Country: South Sudan
- Region: Equatoria
- State: Eastern Equatoria
- County: Kapoeta East County
- Payam: Narus
  - Summer (DST): +3GMT

Lolim (or Lolimi) is a community located in Eastern Equatoria state of South Sudan. It is on the road from Kapoeta to Narus. Lolim lies just north of the Loyuro River, which has a pool called Lolimi. The community is mainly made up of Toposa people.

As of 2004, the Catholic Diocese of Torit was operating a center at Lolim serving the displaced. The Diocese of Torit operates a primary school in the community. In February 2011, the mobile telephone operator Vivacell stated that they were planning to build transmission boosters in Lolim.
