= Loyoro =

Loyoro may refer to

- Loyoro, Uganda, a community in the Kaabong District of Uganda
- Loyoro, South Sudan, a community in Eastern Equatoria state of South Sudan
- Loyoro River, a river in Eastern Equatoria state of South Sudan
