= Kuron =

Kuron may refer to:

- Kuroń, a Polish surname
- Kūron Oshiro (born 1961), Japanese composer
- Kuron, South Sudan, a boma (administrative unit) in South Sudan
  - Kuron peace village, or Holy Trinity peace village, a village in Kuron
