= Narus River =

The Narus River may refer to:

- Narus River, Kapoeta, which mainly flows through Kapoeta East County in South Sudan
- Narus River, Uganda, which mainly flows through Kidepo Valley National Park in northern Uganda

== See also ==
- Narus (disambiguation)
