= Kapoeta East County =

- County
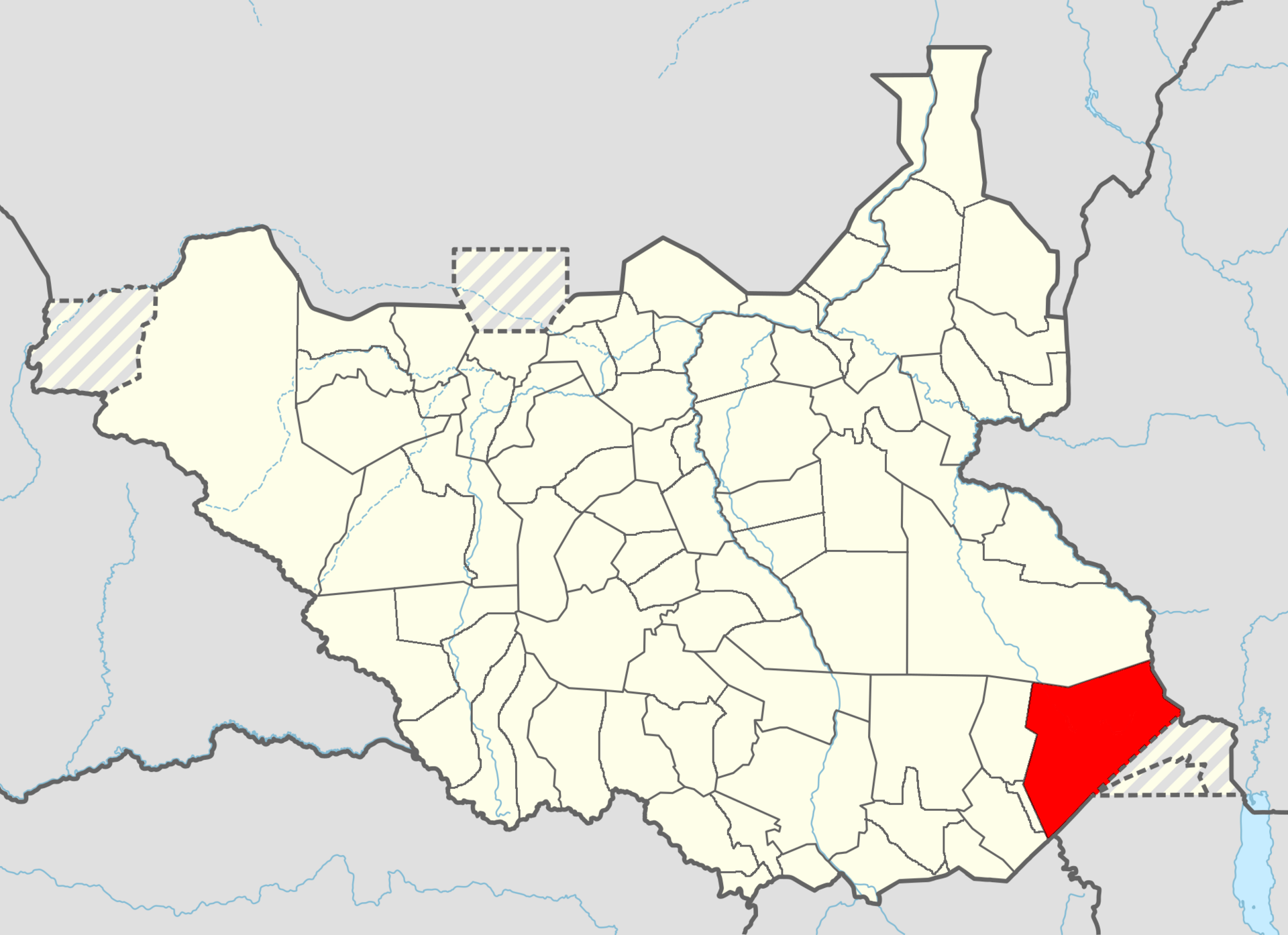
- Location in South Sudan
- Coordinates: 4°30′4″N 34°9′42″E
- Country: South Sudan
- Region: Equatoria
- State: Eastern Equatoria
- Headquarters: Narus

Area
  - Total: 29,638 km^{2} (11,443 sq mi)

Population (2017 estimate)
  - Total: 252,271
  - Density: 8.5117/km^{2} (22.045/sq mi)
- Time zone: UTC+2 (CAT)

Kapoeta East County is an administrative region of Eastern Equatoria state in South Sudan, bordered by Kenya to the south, Ethiopia to the east and Jonglei state to the west. It is part of the Greater Kapoeta region of the state. The largest ethnic group is the Toposa people. The principal town is Narus. The county includes the disputed Ilemi triangle, controlled by Kenya. The emblem of the county is a horned bull, with big humps and a large tail.

Eastern Equatoria - Kapoeta East to the East.

== Location ==
Most of the county is covered by undulating plain. Average rainfall is less than 700 millimetres (28 in) annually. Vegetation consists of thorny scrub and areas of open grassland. To the east of the plains the Eastern Uplands run along the Ethiopean border.

The county is administratively divided into the Natinga, Narus, Mogos, Jie, Kauto, Naita hills and Katodori payams. Jie Payam is located in the extreme northwest corner of the county, home of the minority tribe of Jiye/Jie. This payam has been cut off from its neighbors for years. It has no sustainable water, and all attempts to drill boreholes have failed. In the past the whole community has migrated to the Buma area of Jonglei state in search of water, resulting in violent conflict with neighboring communities. Kabekenyang/Natinga payam includes the villages of Natinga and Kabekenyan. Narus payam includes Narus and Nadapal.

== Economy ==
The pastoral people own large numbers of cattle, sheep and goats. They graze their animals near their villages in the rainy season, then move them to dry-season pastures when the rains end, gradually moving back to the village which they reach at the start of the next rainy season.

In February 2011 the mobile telephone operator Vivacell stated that they had an operational transmission booster in Narus and was planning to build other boosters in Lolim, Loyoro and Napotpot.

The Holy Trinity Peace Village at Kuron, in the north east, was founded in 1997 with a demonstration farm. It as intended as a model to show that the different peoples of the area including Toposa, Jiye/Jie, Murle, Nyangatom and Kachipo could live and work together in harmony. The village has attracted considerable attention from aid organizations, with construction of a school, grinding mill, primary health care center etc. A bridge was built nearby over the Kuron River, which flows into the country from Ethiopia. Benefits were mixed, with improvements in communication with the Buda region offset by creation of a new route for cattle rustling.

== Health and education ==
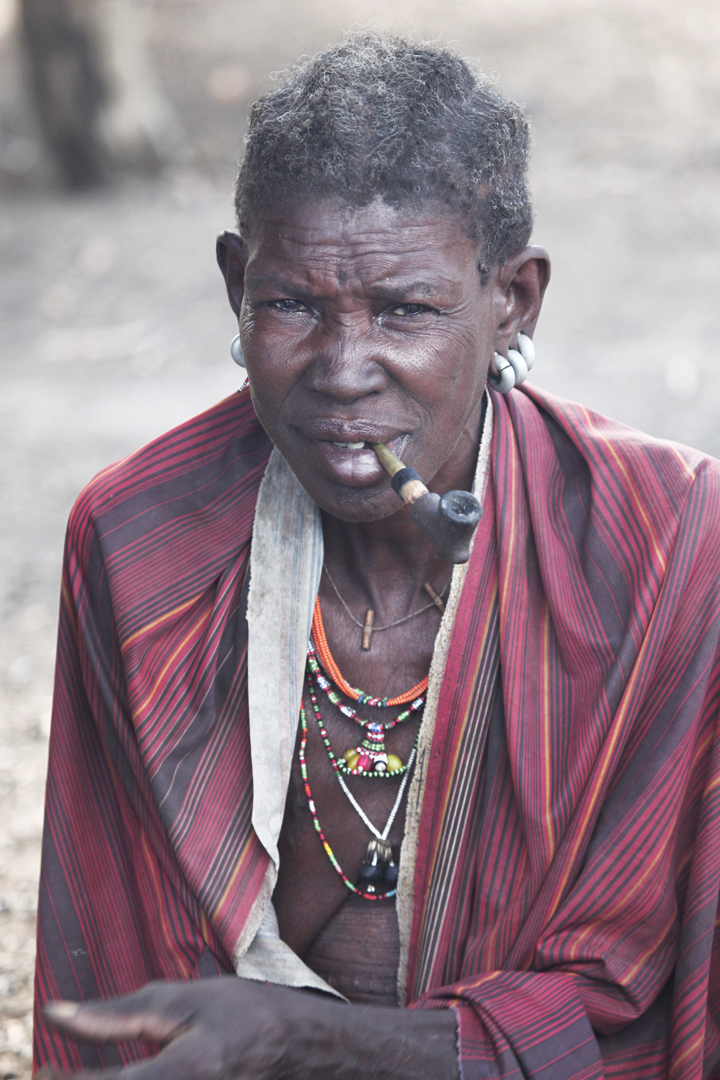
Toposa woman

Malaria is a problem is some parts of the county. In 2011, long lasting mosquito nets were being distributed to women and children under the age of five by Population Services International - Sudan, an NGO. In the first quarter of 2011, 136 cases of Dracunculiasis (guinea worm disease) were reported from Kapoeta East out of 194 cases for all of South Sudan. The disease is caught by drinking stagnant contaminated water. In 2009 there were plans to launch a vaccination program against Meningitis in the county, following reports of 62 cases of Meningitis A in Kapoeta North and South.

Kapoeta East has the poorest level of health care coverage of Eastern Equatoria with just one facility for every 66,000 people. The Catholic Diocese of Torit operates a primary health care center in Narus with 25 beds for in-patients. The center provides clinical care, laboratory services, ANC, Immunization, Health Education and Child care. The Kuron Primary Health Care Unit at Kuron Peace Village, in the extreme east of the county is supervised by the Narus center. The diocese also operates a primary health care center at Nanyangachor, towards the Ethiopian border in the east of the county. This center has a catchment population of over 300,000 people from the Toposa and Nyangatom ethnic groups.

A 2008 survey found that less than 30% of school age children were enrolled in schools in the Eastern Equatoria State. Prevalent cultural values did not favor education, particularly of girls, and girls lacked support while at school. Following a program initiated by UNICEF assisted by other organizations such as SNV Netherlands, a slight increase in enrollment was achieved. In 2009, 6,090 pupils (3,799 boys, and 2,291 girls) were enrolled in Kapoeta East County compared to 6,041 pupils (3,754 boys and 2,287 girls) in 2008.

== Issues ==
For many years the Toposa people of Kapoeta have exchanged cross-border cattle raids with the Turkana people of Kenya, and have been involved in conflict over pasturage and access to water points. The two governments began intensive bottom-up conflict resolution approaches in May 2010. By July 2011 the Kapoeta East county commissioner Titus Lokwacuma reported that the situation was much calmer than it had been in the past.

The border crossing at Nadapal on the road from Narus to Lokichogio in Kenya has a vital role in supply of goods and services to Southern Sudan, forming part of the "Northern Corridor" linking the port of Mombasa through Kenya to Southern Sudan. In July 2008 the border crossing road was closed after Kenyan police prevented truckers from bringing arms into their country. A dispute flared up, with troops from both sides arriving, and the border remained closed for two days as the dispute was sorted out.

In July 2011 the South Sudan government imposed a ban on entry of Somali people to the country, forcing hundreds of traders and truck drivers to camp at the Nadapal border. After a two-week delay the government relaxed the rule, saying that Somalis of Kenyan origin could enter as long as they produced their national identity cards or passports. For security reasons, non-Kenyan Somalis were still rigidly excluded. This came at a time when growing numbers of Kenyans were seeking business opportunities in the newly independent South Sudan, making the border crossing increasingly busy.
