= Nanyangachor =

- Village
- Location in South Sudan
- Coordinates: 5.498993°N 34.773102°E
- Country: South Sudan
- Region: Equatoria
- State: Eastern Equatoria
- County: Kapoeta East County
- Payam: Kauto Payam
- Time zone: UTC+2 (CAT)

Nanyangacor (or Nanyangacor) is a community in Eastern Equatoria state of South Sudan. It is in the Eastern Uplands of Kapoeta East County, near the border with Ethiopia.

== Location ==
Nanyangachor is about 180 kilometres (110 mi) northeast of Narus, in the dry season about a five-hour drive. In the rainy season the drive may take much longer. It is located on a plateau surrounded by mountains, and is much cooler than in the plains to the west. Cattle play an important role in the economy. Cattle raiding with their neighbors, including the Turkana people to the south in Kenya, is endemic. Periodically the people conduct peace meetings to try to find a way to prevent further raids. Women have increasingly been involved.

== Education and health ==
The Catholic Diocese of Torit runs the Nanyang'achor Primary School. The diocese also operates a primary health care center at Nanyangachor, with a catchment population of over 300,000 people from the Toposa and Nyangatom ethnic groups. In 2007 there was an outbreak of measles in Nanyangachor, with 30 cases reported and one death as of 7 October. A later report said that 821 children had died of the disease and 2,500 more had been affected. By December that year the outbreak was under control. 20,551 children had been immunized in the villages of Naita, Bilamoi, Nakudochua, Kuron, Kauto areas and Nanyangachor west, a coverage of 60%.

== 2010 food emergency ==
In March 2010 it was reported that Turkana from Kenya had again been conducting regular cattle raids in the area. The supply of food from Uganda and Kenya had deteriorated in 2010 due to lack of logistic support, poor road conditions and insecurity. People were managing to collect wild fruit, and had milk supplies. They were selling some animals for food in Narus and Kapoeta, but only to a very limited degree due to the danger and difficulty of the journey to market. Some children under five years old were suffering from Marasmus, caused by malnutrition. The World Food Programme was conducting a general food distribution. School attendance had decreased due to hunger. There were serious shortages of basic drugs in Nanyangachor Hospital.
