= Riwoto =

- Location in South Sudan
- Coordinates: 4.895309°N 33.521025°E
- Country: South Sudan
- Region: Equatoria
- State: Eastern Equatoria
- County: Kapoeta North County
- Time zone: UTC+2 (CAT)

Riwoto is a community in Eastern Equatoria state of South Sudan. It is a payam and village in Kapoeta North County.

== Location ==
The community is on the road between Torit and Kapoeta, open in both the dry and rainy seasons. A local bus links Riwoto to Kapoeta, 20 kilometres (12 mi) to the southeast. As of 2010 Riwoto was described by the United Nations Mission in Sudan as a "relatively calm and peaceful place without any security incidents reported in recent times, with exception to sporadic cattle raiding and abduction of local children by other local tribes". A well provides water. The village has a basic medical clinic attended by a nurse. The primary health care center is a base for distribution of treated mosquito nets, and provides vaccinations against tetanus, polio and measles.

== Economy ==
The people of Riwoto are Toposa, a pastoral community. In 2008 the Riwoto Cooperative Society, run by women, was set up to improve livestock marketing of livestock and sale of animal products such as milk. According to Nakwam, secretary of the cooperative: "Now I am able to send my children to school, because I can pay the costs of school from the income I get from selling animals. Before, we were keeping livestock only for our prestige and for wedding dowries". A very basic market with limited goods for sale is open sporadically in Riwoto village.

== Relations with neighbors ==
The Toposa of Riwoto and their neighbors, including the Larim group of the Buya people to their west, have a history of clashes. In September–October 2003 a series of reconciliation meetings were held with the Toposa sections of Paringa, Riwoto, Machi. About 400 people participated in the Riwoto session, and accepted reconciliation with the other Toposa sections and with the Buya. Following further disputes over cattle and resources, a series of peace and reconciliation meetings between the Buya and Toposa in October 2004 culminated in a spontaneous peace dialogue in Kimotong payam of Budi county that drew 3,000 participants, including 800 women. 21 leaders from both communities then walked the 42 kilometres (26 mi) to Riwoto, where they were welcomed with a feast and celebration. In December 2007 the Riwoto and Larim communities held a five-day youth peace and reconciliation conference in Kimotong. They recommended opening the Napak-Riwoto road to improve communications.

In June 2010 some Toposa men from Riwoto abducted a 10-year-old Buya boy, taking him over 200 kilometres (120 mi) to Moru Akipi, near the border with Ethiopia, where they planned to trade him for cattle. Other members of the Toposa were concerned that the crime would damage the push for reconciliation with the Buya. They traveled by foot to Moru Akipi to recover the child and brought him back, handing him to the local authorities for return to the Buya. Impressed by this action a leader of the Buya women in Chawa, Anna Nalemuo Lotubatamoi, walked with other women the 42 kilometres (26 mi) from Chawa to Riwoto, stopping at villages along the way and managing to persuade the Toposa leaders to start peace talks.
