= Natinga =

- Village
- Location in South Sudan
- Coordinates: 4°15′10″N 33°59′57″E
- Country: South Sudan
- Region: Equatoria
- State: Eastern Equatoria
- County: Budi County
- Payam: Lotukei Payam
- Time zone: UTC+2 (CAT)

Natinga originated from Didinga's common word "kitingatek" which literally means let's force it.

During the advent of SPLM/A struggles and in 1989, the Didinga SPLA Commander the late Lincoln Loki Lokoro, husband to Hon. Lucy Yaya mobilized the soldiers and local communities to open up a footpath that passed from Himan(New Cush) to Nadapal.

This was the time when Omar Bashir staked a coup- d'état and took power in Khartoum. Following that even in Khartoum, the Toposa militiamen became very active on the Narus-Kapoeta roads. Tried to disrupt and block SPLA activities along this international road to Kenya. So the SPLA had to look for other safest alternative roads.

The decision was to locally construct the road from Lotukei to Nadapal. It was the old British Colonialist road which was constructed by the Didinga people.

Nonetheless, Lincoln started the footpath smoothly. Reported the road workers got very tired when the road reached Loruth. Some local communities deserted the road work. The soldiers who were left behind were ordered to continue with the work to the end. With looming hunger and fatigue, the workers were to give up the road work.

However, Commander Lincoln Loki Lokoro has to apply a bit of militaristic force on the soldiers to finish up the road. On reaching Loruth Lincoln urged the people " Kitingatek logoo"(let's force it guys). And immediately nicknamed Loruth with a new name called "Natinga". This was how the name originated.

Later it became a place that was used to accommodate the Internally Displaced people (IDPS) during Sudan civil war and a school that was established in 1993 in South Sudan for boys forced from their homes by the Second Sudanese Civil War. It is the historic place in Budi County of Eastern Equatoria.

== Location ==
Natinga is in a small village at the base of the foothills of the Losolia Mountains. It is just north of the Kenyan border. These are the mountains where John Garang de Mabior, founder and wartime leader of Sudan People's Liberation Army (SPLA) died in a helicopter accident in 2005. The village is near the scene of the crash. Natinga is inhabited by the Didinga people, it is in Lotukei Payam, Budi County.

== Arrivals and departures ==
In March 1993 Moli Tokoro and Borongoli camps were evacuated for Natinga after the National Islamic Front had made advances in the south. The route led through Palotaka, where about 800 of the unaccompanied minors decided to settle. In some cases the SPLA appears to have recruited boys as fighters. There were 2,800 unaccompanied boys at the school in Natinga in August 1994. By March 1995 only 600 boys were left. By June the number of unaccompanied boys had risen again to 1,700. In 2000 the Sudanese NGO JARRAD was given help by USAID in an effort to airlift an estimated 4,000 Internally Displaced People (IDPs) from the camps of Natinga, Narus and Himan (New Cush), returning them to their home areas in Bor County. There were delays getting started, and many of the IDPs moved to Kakuma camp in Kenya instead. However, a 1,300 metres (4,300 ft) long airstrip was built to the east of Natinga, and eventually 2,086 IDPs were airlifted.
