= Loyuro River =

Stream in Eastern Equatoria State, South Sudan

Coordinates: 4°52′14″N 34°29′31″E

The Loyuro River (or Loyooro, Loyoro) is a stream in Eastern Equatoria State of South Sudan. The river originates in the east of Didinga Hills, flowing eastward into Greater Kapoeta and discharging into the swampy area northeast of Narus. The river floods during the rainy season, but ceases to flow at other times. The Toposa people have a ritual center at Loyuro River. Lolimi is a permanent water hole on the river, on the road between Narus and Kapoeta.
