= Jiye =

Jiye may refer to:

- Jieh, a town in Lebanon
- Jiye people, an ethnic group in South Sudan
