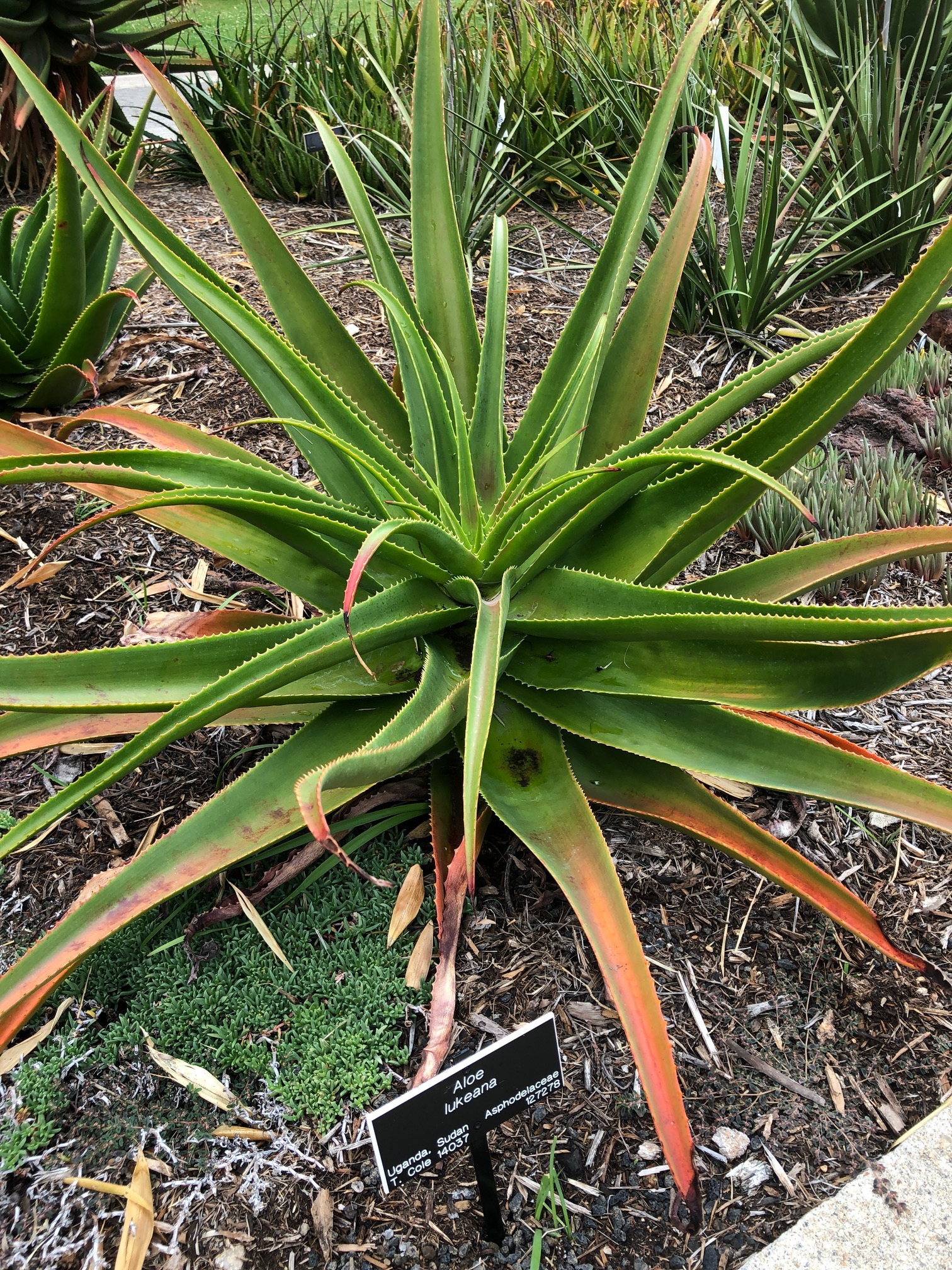
- Aloe lukeana at The Huntington Library

Conservation status
- Endangered (IUCN 3.1)
- CITES Appendix II (CITES)

Scientific classification
- Kingdom: Plantae
- Clade: Tracheophytes
- Clade: Angiosperms
- Clade: Monocots
- Order: Asparagales
- Family: Asphodelaceae
- Subfamily: Asphodeloideae
- Genus: Aloe
- Species: A. lukeana

Binomial name
- Aloe lukeana T. C. Cole

= Aloe lukeana =

Species of succulent

Aloe lukeana, or Luke's aloe, is a solitary species of aloe plant with a 3-to-5-foot tall (91 to 152 cm) stem topped by a 3-to-4-foot wide (91 to 122 cm) rosette with multiple (20 to 30) 2-foot long (61 cm) by up to 5-inch (13 cm) wide, recurving, and channeled dark green leaves with large evenly spaced light colored teeth. A. lukeana is native to Mount Morungole near the borders of South Sudan and Kenya in the Karamoja region of Uganda. The species was first formally described by Thomas Cole in 2015 in Cactus and Succulent Journal. Cole named the species after his brother, Luke Cole, who was killed in a traffic accident in Uganda in 2009.
