= Adam Odzimek =

Polish priest (1944–2022)

- Auxiliary Bishop Emeritus of Radom
- Appointed: 25 March 1992
- Term ended: 7 October 2019
- Other post: Titular Bishop of Tadamata
- Previous post: Auxiliary Bishop of Sandomierz (1985–1992)

Orders
- Ordination: 31 May 1969 by Piotr Golebiowski
- Consecration: 12 May 1985 by Edward Henryk Materski

Personal details
- Born: 7 October 1944 Radom, General Government (modern day Poland)
- Died: 13 March 2022 (aged 77) Radom, Poland

Adam Odzimek (7 October 1944 – 13 March 2022) was a Polish Roman Catholic prelate.

Odzimek was born in Radom, Poland, on 7 October 1944. He was ordained to the priesthood in 1969. He served as titular bishop of 'Tadamata' and was auxiliary bishop of the Roman Catholic Diocese of Sandomierz, Poland, from 1985 to 1992 and as auxiliary bishop of the Roman Catholic Diocese of Radom, Poland from 1992 until his retirement in 2019.

Odzimek died in Radom on 13 March 2022, at the age of 77.

Catholic Church titles
Preceded by Paride Taban	Titular Bishop of Tadamata; 1985–2022	Succeeded by Sede vacante
