= Singaita River =

River in South Sudan

Coordinates: 4.772644°N 33.584132°E

The Singaita River (also Khawr Thingaita, Khor Thingaita, Rigl Thimgaita, Singeitta) is a river in Eastern Equatoria state of South Sudan that flows through the town of Kapoeta.

The Nathilani River, which starts from Nathilan hills in Loudo and flows through Loudo, is one of the Singaita's tributaries. The Murle people at one time lived in the Thingaita Valley, but were later displaced by the Toposa. The Toposa people now live along both sides of the Singaita and Lokalyen rivers.

The post at Kapoeta on the east bank of the river was established by Captain Knollys, who reached the river in January 1927. Near Kapoeta the river is about 150 yards wide, and normally has a sandy dry bed, but heavy rainstorms in the Didinga Hills can turn it into a raging, impassable flood overnight. A 125-meter drift was built to cross the Thingaita River at Kapoeta with USAID funding in 1983.
