= Paride Taban =

Sudanese Roman Catholic prelate (1936–2023)

His Excellency Paride Taban
- Bishop Emeritus of Torit
- Metropolis: Juba
- Appointed: 2 July 1983
- Term ended: 7 February 2004
- Predecessor: First
- Successor: Akio Johnson Mutek
- Previous posts: Auxiliary Bishop of Juba and Titular Bishop of Tadamata (1980–1983)

Orders
- Ordination: 24 May 1964
- Consecration: 4 May 1980 by Pope John Paul II

Personal details
- Born: 24 May 1936 Opari, Equatoria, Anglo-Egyptian Sudan
- Died: 1 November 2023 (aged 87) Nairobi, Kenya

Paride Taban (24 May 1936 – 1 November 2023) was a South Sudanese prelate of the Catholic Church and was the first leader of the Sudan Council of Churches, which was founded in February 1990. He was Auxiliary Bishop of Juba from 28 January 1980 to 2 July 1983 and served as Bishop of Torit from 1983 to 2004.

== Biography ==
Paride Taban was born in 1936. He was ordained on 24 May 1964 and consecrated a Bishop on 4 May 1980 in Kinshasa by Pope John Paul II. He was auxiliary bishop of the Archdiocese of Juba and the titular bishop of Tadamata from 1980 to 1983.

Taban was the first bishop of the Roman Catholic Diocese of Torit in what was then Sudan from 1983 until 2004. In 1989, when the rebel Sudan People's Liberation Army (SPLA) overtook Torit, he was arrested with three other Catholic priests by the SPLA. Until 1990 he and Nathanael Garang were the only two Bishops active in areas held by the SPLA. After his retirement from the diocese, he led an effort to make peace in South Sudan real by setting up the Kuron Peace Village, established in 2005.

Taban was sent to Rwanda in the aftermath of the 1994 genocide for reconciliation efforts.

Bishop Paride received numerous awards including the Sergio Vieira de Mello Peace Prize awarded by UN Secretary General Ban Ki-moon in 2013 for his work at the Holy Trinity Peace Village in Kuron and the Hubert Walter Award for Reconciliation and Interfaith Cooperation awarded by the Archbishop of Canterbury Justin Welby in 2017 for co-founding the ecumenical New Sudan Council of Churches, building Kuron Peace Village, and chairing the mediation initiative between the Government of South Sudan and COBRA Faction of the South Sudan Democratic Movement/Army led by David Yau Yau, which produced a successful peace agreement on 6 January 2014.

In December 2016, Taban was appointed by the President Salva Kiir as a co-chair of the steering committee of National Dialogue. Taban had witnessed the suffering of South Sudanese since he was young and he was not happy to see south South Sudanese suffering at the hands of their fellow southerners.

Taban died on 1 November 2023, at the age of 87.

=== Awards ===
Taban was awarded the Prix Caritas from Caritas Switzerland in 2004.

In September 2017, Taban received the peace award of the United Religious Initiatives for Africa.

In May 2018 Taban received the Four Freedoms Award, freedom of Worship medal from the Roosevelt Foundation for his life-long and selfless dedication to the cause of bringing freedom and peace to the people of South Sudan.

On 9 November 2023, Taban posthumously received the Opus Prize for his lifelong dedication to the Kuron Peace Village. The award was accepted by Dr. Margaret Itto, deputy Chair of the Board for Holy Trinity Peace Village Kuron.

Catholic Church titles
Preceded by First	Bishop of Torit; 1983–2004	Succeeded by Akio Johnson Mutek
Preceded by —	Auxiliary Bishop of Juba; 1980–1983	Succeeded by —
Preceded by Eugène-Marie Ernoult	Titular Bishop of Tadamata; 1980–1983	Succeeded by Adam Odzimek
