= Nadapal =

- Village
- Location within Kenya
- Coordinates: 4.405077°N 34.283739°E
- Country: Kenya
- County: Turkana County
- Time zone: UTC+2 (EAT)

Nadapal is a community in the north of Turkana County, Kenya near the border with the Eastern Equatoria state of South Sudan. The Nadapal belt is an area stretching 25 kilometres (16 mi) southward from the border with South Sudan to Lokichogio in Kenya.

The village of Nadapal lies on the road between Narus in South Sudan and Lokichogio.

The area has been the scene of violent clashes between Toposa and Turkana pastoralists, traditional rivals.

It is becoming a vital border crossing as trade between Kenya and South Sudan booms following independence.

== People ==
A June 2009 assessment of Nadapal by the UNHCR said 90% of the people in Nadapal were Toposa. The assessment correctly placed the village in the Narus payam of Eastern Equatoria State, Kenya. The mistake may be because the Kenya Defence Forces (KDF) had a presence in the village, and the Toposa people mostly live north of the border. The village chief estimated the population was 3,500 including 300 returnees from the nearby Kakuma refugee camp in Kenya. Most of the people were IDPs from Jongole State. The majority of people were pastoralist.

== Economy ==
The Nadapal belt includes valuable pasture and water points and has long been a point of conflict between Turkana and Toposa herders. In normal times, the Nadapal wetlands provide abundant pasturage and water for the herds of cattle, sheep and goats. The 2009 assessment found that available food included sorghum, maize, meat, sugar, oil, salt and rice, cooked using firewood collected by the women. Insufficient rain was causing food insecurity. The river was not running even in the rainy season. The village had three functioning boreholes providing fair-quality potable water, which the women collected. Some families had latrines while others used the bushes. The nearest health services were in Narus, more than 3 hours away on foot, and in Lokichogio, more than 4 hours away on foot.

By 2007, the village had one primary school with 428 pupils taught outdoors under trees by 11 teachers. The nearest secondary school was in Narus town, 25 kilometres (16 mi) away. School supplies were being provided by the Government of South Sudan's State Ministry of Education and UNICEF. Oxfam and the local organization Turkana Education For All helped improve facilities, and by 2009, enrollment at the primary school had increased to 1,425.

== Civil war ==
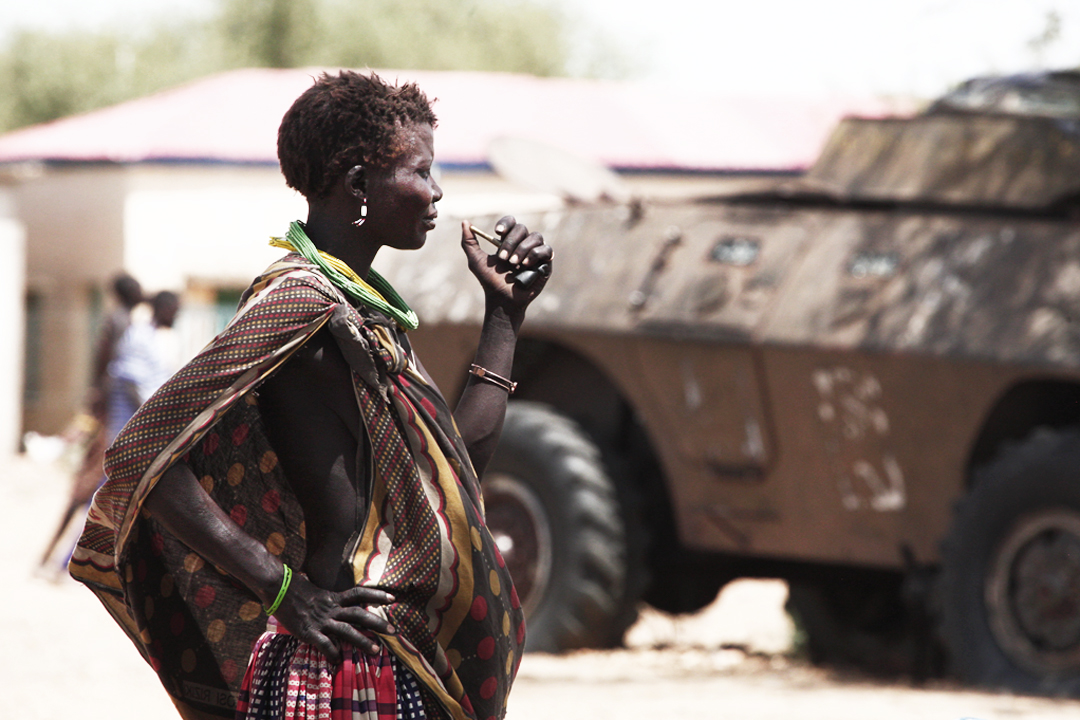
Toposa woman – armored vehicle in background.

After the outbreak of the Second Sudanese Civil War in Sudan in 1983, the United Nations sponsored an operation called Lifeline Sudan for emergency relief, based in Lokichogio. Soldiers of the Sudan People's Liberation Army (SPLA) moved into the area to escort relief convoys. During the civil war many people from South Sudan took refuge in Kenya from the Sudanese Armed Forces. With the end of the conflict, some Kenyans wanted the Toposa of the Nadapal area to return to South Sudan. The Toposa may have been reluctant in part because of the economic importance of the green Nadapal belt, but also in part because they felt that dominant tribes in South Sudan such as the Dinka and Nuer thought the Toposa had backed the Government of Sudan during the civil war, and they would therefore be treated as an unwelcome minority in Eastern Equatoria.

== Post-civil war conflict ==
The SPLA troops did not immediately leave after the end of the civil war in January 2005. On 30 July 2009, two Kenyan cabinet members visiting the area were stopped by SPLA troops. The Kenyan government asked the SPLA to leave the country, but otherwise took a restrained position. In October 2009, it was reported that some Toposa people attacked the newly established barracks in Nadapal and killed 16 Kenyan troops. Kenya denied that the incident had occurred. A second attack occurred a week later. With growing tension, some of the Toposa moved north to Kapoeta to live with relatives. Kenyan police were providing armed escorts for civilian vehicles travelling from Lokichokio to Nadapal, and the SPLA was providing armed escorts from Nadapal to Kapoeta.

There were ongoing clashes between the Toposa and Turkana. In February 2010, there were two serious incidents. Turkana raiders attacked Toposa cattle camps near Nadapal, with six Toposa and two Turkana raiders being killed. Ten days later, Toposa youth ambushed a vehicle between Nadapal and Lokichoggio, killing two Kenyans and wounding an unknown number. According to an SPLA spokesman, Khartoum's Alintibaha newspaper deliberately misquoted Reuters and said the Kenyan Defence Ministry had accused the SPLA of the second ambush. Following the second incident, the Standard reported that "Kenya and Southern Sudan security forces are conducting a joint security operation to crack down on suspected Toposa militia along the border". A May 2010 report said the fighting between Toposa and Turkana had claimed over 40 lives and about 4,000 livestock had been stolen. It also said that George Echom, Deputy Governor of Eastern Equatorial State, had claimed that Nadapal belonged to South Sudan.

== Commerce ==
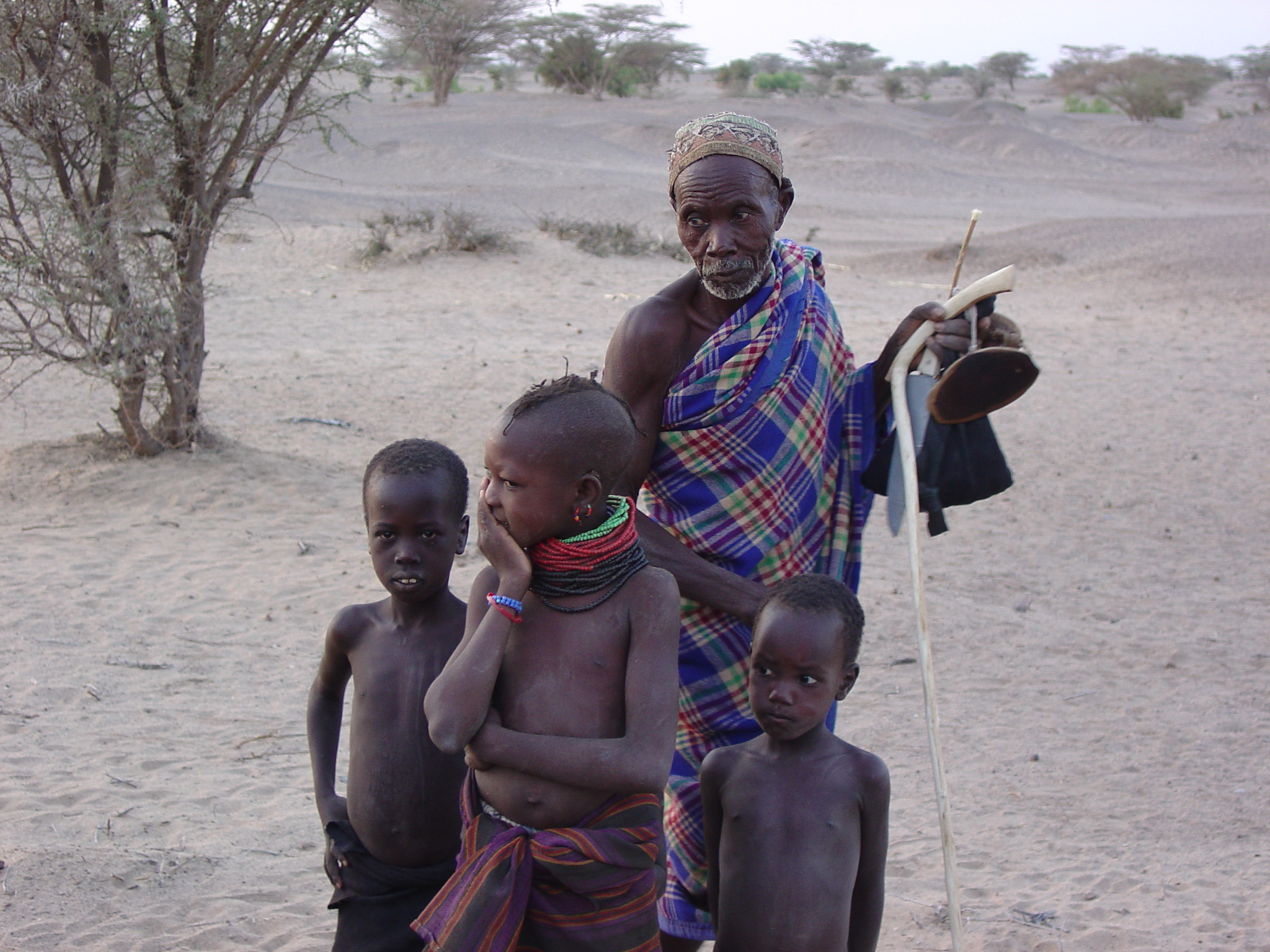
Turkana people

In February 2008 the South Sudanese government awarded a contract to upgrade the 375 kilometres (233 mi) road between Nadapal and Juba from gravel to international trunk road bitumen standard. The start of work was delayed due to security problems and the need to remove mines laid during the civil war. The road had assumed a vital role in supply of goods and services to Southern Sudan, forming part of the "Northern Corridor" linking the port of Mombasa through Kenya to Southern Sudan. In July 2008 the border crossing was closed after Kenyan police prevented truckers from bringing arms into their country. A dispute flared up, with troops from both sides arriving, and the border remained closed for two days as the dispute was sorted out. About 80 trucks from South Sudan were held up during the closure.

The South Sudan government established an Immigration office at Nadapal to promote trade and boost security, and built 51 housing units for South Sudan Immigration Office, Public Health, Police and other government workers. The facilities were opened early in July 2011. That month, the South Sudan government imposed a ban on entry of Somali people to the country, forcing hundreds of traders and truck drivers to camp at the Nadapal border. After a two-week delay the government relaxed the rule, saying that Somalis of Kenyan origin could enter as long as they produced their national identity cards or passports. For security reasons, non-Kenyan Somalis were still rigidly excluded. This came at a time when growing numbers of Kenyans were seeking business opportunities in the newly independent South Sudan, making the border crossing increasingly busy.
