= Lokomarinyang =

- Village
- Location in South Sudan
- Coordinates: 05°01′02″N 35°35′34″E
- Administered by: South Sudan
- Claimed by: South Sudan and Kenya
- Region: Equatoria
- State: Eastern Equatoria
- County: Kapoeta East County
- Elevation: 462 m (1,516 ft)
- Time zone: GMT+3

Lokomarinyang is a village and a rolling hill west of the village. The village and the Ilemi Triangle in which it is located are disputed territories between South Sudan and Kenya. It is located off the E373 road, and is roughly circular-shaped and mainly composed of small huts and other minor residential and commercial structures.

Lokomarinyang, whose name means "place of the yellow soil", is inhabited by the Turkana people, who formerly ran a dried milk (called "Edado") factory in the town, which was manufactured partially for subsistence with the surpluses sold off. However, the market for Edado has diminished in recent years, resulting in the subsequent closure of the factory.

It was affected by a 1999 food crisis in the Horn of Africa in which villagers were forced to walk almost 100 kilometers to a food distribution hub run by Médecins Sans Frontierès in the village of Kaikor, Kenya to avoid starvation. Multiple children were reported to have been eaten by hyenas during this difficult period. The village is also prone to cattle rustling raids conducted by the nearby Toposa people.
