= Kuron, South Sudan =

Kuron
- Boma Village
- Location within South Sudan
- Coordinates: 5°41′56″N 34°33′54″E
- Country: South Sudan
- Region: Equatoria
- State: Eastern Equatoria
- County: Kapoeta East County
- Payam: Kauto Payam

Population (2008)
  - Total: 1,857

Kuron is a boma in Kauto Payam, Kapoeta East County, Eastern Equatoria State, South Sudan.

== Demographics ==
According to the Fifth Population and Housing Census of Sudan, conducted in April 2008, Kuron boma had a population of 1,857 people, composed of 1,202 male and 655 female residents. (Note: In 2008, at the time of the census, Kuron was located in Eastern Equatoria State, Kapoeta East County. The data collected during the Fifth Population and Housing Census of Sudan were to be the primary source of information for decisions about the number and demarcation of electoral constituencies and administrative boundaries in what was then southern Sudan. South Sudanese officials rejected census results for southern Sudan. See Darfur Relief and Documentation Centre (2010). 5th Population and Housing Census in Sudan – An Incomplete Exercise (PDF) (Report). Darfur Relief and Documentation Centre, Geneva (Switzerland). Archived from the original (PDF) on 18 September 2017. Also, see Demographics of South Sudan.)

== Kuron peace village ==
The Holy Trinity peace village (often simply called the Kuron peace village) is located in Kuron. It was founded by Bishop Paride Taban in 2005.
