= Naru =

Naru may refer to:

== Fiction ==
- Naru Narusegawa, a character in the Love Hina series
- Naaru, a race of energy beings in World of Warcraft
- Kazuya Shibuya, a character in the Ghost Hunt series
- Naru Osaka, a character from the Japanese manga series Sailor Moon
- Naru (Prey character), the protagonist of the 2022 film Prey

== People ==
- Naru Shinoya (篠谷 菜留; born 1994), Japanese badminton player
- Naru Nanao (七尾 奈留; born 1994), Japanese artist

== Places ==
- Naru, Fars, a village in Fars Province, Iran
- Naru, Nagasaki, or Gotō, the city that includes Naru Island, Japan
- Naru Island (Japan), one of the Goto Islands in Japan
- Naru Island (Solomon Islands), one of the Solomon Islands

== See also ==
- Narus (disambiguation)
- Nauru, an island nation in the South Pacific
