= Emmanuel Bernardino Lowi Napeta =

South Sudanese Catholic prelate (born 1973)

The Most Reverend Emmanuel Bernardino Lowi Napeta
- Bishop of Torit, South Sudan
- Church: Catholic Church
- Archdiocese: Roman Catholic Archdiocese of Juba
- See: Roman Catholic Diocese of Torit
- Appointed: 8 November 2022
- Installed: 15 January 2023
- Predecessor: Stephen Ameyu Martin Mulla
- Successor: Incumbent

Orders
- Ordination: 24 October 2004 by Gabriel Zubeir Wako
- Consecration: 15 January 2022 by Cardinal Gabriel Zubeir Wako
- Rank: Bishop

Personal details
- Born: Emmanuel Bernardino Lowi Napeta; 19 December 1973 (age 52) Kapoeta, Diocese of Torit, Eastern Equatoria State, South Sudan

Styles of Emmanuel Bernardino Lowi Napeta
- Reference style: Your Eminence; The Most Reverend
- Spoken style: His Eminence
- Religious style: Bishop

Emmanuel Bernardino Lowi Napeta (born 19 December 1973) is a South Sudanese Catholic prelate who is the bishop of the Roman Catholic Diocese of Torit in South Sudan since 8 November 2022. Before that, from 24 October 2004 until he was appointed bishop, he was a priest of the Archdiocese of Khartoum in Sudan. He was appointed bishop by Pope Francis. He was consecrated bishop at Torit on 15 January 2023.

== Background and education ==
He was born on 19 December 1973 in Kapoeta, Diocese of Torit, Eastern Equatoria, South Sudan. From 1994 until 1995, he studied at the Saint Augustine Minor Seminary in Khartoum. He then transferred to the Saint Paul Major Seminary in Khartoum, where he studied from 1996 until 2003. He holds a Bachelor's degree in Science of Education with specialization in Religious Education, awarded by the Pontifical Salesian University, in Rome, where he studied from 2010 until 2012. He continued his studies at the same university from 2012 until 2014, graduating with a Licentiate in Education, focusing on "Youth Pastoral Care and Catechetics".

== Priest ==
On 20 February 2004, he was ordained a deacon for the Archdiocese of Khartoum by Daniel Marco Kur Adwok, Titular Bishop of Moxori and Auxiliary Bishop of Khartoum. He was ordained a priest for the same archdiocese on 24 October 2004 at Khartoum by Cardinal Gabriel Zubeir Wako, Archbishop of Khartoum. He served as a priest until 8 November 2022. While priest, he served in various roles and locations, including as:

- Parish vicar of the Holy Spirit parish in Omdurman, Khartoum from 2004 until 2007.
- Director of the Institute of Catechists for the Third Millennium, Khartoum from 2007 until 2010.
- Studies in Rome at the Pontifical Salesian University, leading to the award of a bachelor's degree in science of education (Religious Education) from 2010 until 2012.
- Studies at the same university, leading to the award of a licentiate in Education (Youth Pastoral Care and Catechetics) from 2012 until 2014.
- Deputy parish priest of the Saint Peter and Saint Paul Parish in Khartoum from 2014 until 2017.
- Parish priest of the Cathedral of Saint Matthew, Archdiocese of Khartoum from 2017 until 2022.

== Bishop ==
On 8 November 2022, Pope Francis appointed Reverend Father Monsignor Emmanuel Bernardino Lowi Napeta previously of the clergy of Khartoum as the new Bishop of the Roman Catholic Diocese of Torit in South Sudan. He was consecrated on 15 January 2023 at the Saint Peter and Paul Cathedral at Torit. The Principal Consecrator was Cardinal Gabriel Zubeir Wako, Archbishop Emeritus of Khartoum assisted by Stephen Ameyu Martin Mulla, Archbishop of Juba and Michael Didi Adgum Mangoria, Archbishop of Khartoum. As of 2025, he was still the local ordinary in the Diocese of Torit, under precarious security conditions.

== See also ==
- Catholic Church in South Sudan

== Succession table ==
Catholic Church titles
Preceded by Stephen Ameyu Martin Mulla (3 January 2019 - 12 December 2019)	Bishop of Torit (since November 2022)	Succeeded by Incumbent
