= George Echom =

Minister for Environment, Wildlife Conservation & Tourism of South Sudan

George Echom Ekeno is a politician who was deputy governor of Eastern Equatoria state in South Sudan, and was later appointed state minister for Environment, Wildlife Conservation & Tourism.

Shortly after being appointed Deputy Governor, in August 2007 Echom promised to make security one of his top priorities. Echom was said to be part of the group of state government members opposed to Governor Aloisio Emor Ojetuk. In October 2008 he called on the Government of South Sudan to provide trained medical personnel so that the Referral Hospital in Kapoeta could be opened. In October 2009 there were clashes between Toposa raiders dressed in Sudan People's Liberation Army (SPLA) uniforms and Kenyan police at the border post of Nadapal. George Echom stated that Nadapal was South Sudan territory and would not be surrendered to Kenya.

In May 2011 Dinka Bor cattle herders trespassed into the Nimule and Mugali areas of the Madi people in Magwi County of Eastern Equatoria State, causing massive crop damage. The Madi are farmers, and do not keep cattle. The Bor people were Internally Displaced People (IDPs) from Jonglei State. Echom headed a task forced to resolve the issue. After discussion with Jonglei authorities and leaders of the Bor communities, it was agreed to return over 4,000 cattle to Jonglei. On 10 June 2011 World Environment Day was celebrated in Torit after being postponed from 5 June. Speaking at this event, Echom called for tree planting and conservation and condemned the recent killing of an elephant by poachers in the state. He clarified that his ministry did not own elephants, but protected them for the public.
