= Societal impacts of mining in South Sudan =

South Sudan is believed to have significant mineral resources, though very little formal exploration has been carried out since the Second World War. The government is extremely interested in and active in, promoting investment in exploration and the development of mining projects.

== Minerals ==
South Sudan has in Unity states found on the border of South Sudan and Sudan to the north of the country. And these are;

- Gold.
- Copper.
- Lead.
- Zinc.
- Nickel.
- Marble.

== Positive impacts ==
Mining is of great importance to many communities and has helped to improve their standard of living. Gold mining allows people to earn cash. It is easier and quicker to earn cash with gold mining than with farming or cattle-rearing. It takes a long for a farmer to grow, harvest, and then sell his or her crops. Agricultural products are subject to price fluctuations, so the amount the farmer will get is unpredictable.

For most families, mining is a complementary activity. Income from mining is specifically used for needs that have to be paid for in cash, such as school fees, health care, and dowries, as well as clothing, batteries, and other household items. The miners do not always sell their gold in South Sudan but sometimes send or take it to Uganda, to support their children who go to school in Uganda. Gold is of high value in Uganda, so it can help with family expenditure.

== Negative impacts ==
=== On livelihoods ===
Mining sites are risky places; miners can get sick or HIV infected, be robbed, or abuse alcohol. As the head of the Kapoeta PHCU puts it, mining does not have only benefits. There are negative impacts on the social fabric, the culture, and the values of the communities.

=== Impact on farming and food security ===
Farming is negatively impacted because instead of preparing the fields at the beginning of the rainy season many are out in the mining site.

=== Alcohol abuse and quarrels ===
The businessmen take alcoholic drinks to the mining sites and nearby business centers, and they barter with the gold miners, exchanging alcohol for gold. The youth in particular in many sites and places drink too much alcohol and this leads to quarrels and to violence.

=== Impact on children ===
Children help their families in mining as they do in farming. This support becomes a problem when the sites are in remote places because this means they are prevented from going to school. There are numerous stories of young people dropping out of school to start mining because they are attracted by the ‘easy money.

=== Impact on health ===
Sanitation conditions are poor and consequently pose health risks in the mining sites, which are often far away from any settlement and health center. People drink the water from the streams in which they both pan for gold and bathe and consequently are exposed to water-borne diseases.
