= Kapoeta North County =

- County
- Location in South Sudan
- Coordinates: 4.895309°N 33.521025°E
- Country: South Sudan
- Region: Equatoria
- State: Eastern Equatoria
- Headquarters: Riwoto

Area
  - Total: 5,732 km^{2} (2,213 sq mi)

Population (2017 estimate)
  - Total: 158,889
  - Density: 27.72/km^{2} (71.79/sq mi)
- Time zone: UTC+2 (CAT)

Kapoeta North County is an administrative division in the Eastern Equatoria state of South Sudan. The principal settlement is Riwoto and the largest ethnic group are the Toposa people. The county emblem is an elephant.

Eastern Equatoria

== Government facilities ==
Kapoeta North is part of Greater Kapoeta, and was part of Kapoeta County. After it was split off, in 2006 Kapoeta North County did not have an office building, and the administration was literally operating from under a tree. In March 2011 the United Nations Office for Project Services was inviting bids for construction of a prison complex in Kapoeta North County. In April 2011 the county was hit by a heavy rain and wind storm that caused extensive destruction. The primary and secondary schools, the police station, and about 60 houses were destroyed.

== Water and health ==
The county had limited water supplies, and after many years of civil war about 40% of the water points were not functioning. As a result, diseases due to drinking unsafe water were common, including guinea worm disease, scabies, eye infections and diarrhoea. The situation has improved with assistance from NGOs and international aid organizations. However, at least 90% of the population still have no access to latrines and instead use the bush.

In May 2009 elders and women in Riwoto held a two-day peaceful demonstration after their three boreholes had broken down almost a month before. The acting county commissioner Tito Abbas Lomoro said his office, working with the Carter Center, had commissioned urgent repairs. However, the repair technicians needed money and materials from the state government to do the work. In October 2010 it was reported that the Association for Aid and Relief, Japan had built two Urban Water Systems in Kapoeta North capable of supplying safe drinking water to more than 20,000 people daily.

By 2009 there were less than 5,000 cases of dracunculiasis (Guinea worm disease) in the world, most in Eastern Equatoria state, and there were good prospects of completely eradicating the disease. The Guinea worm case containment center in Kapoeta North, operated by the Southern Sudan Guinea Worm Eradication Program assisted by the Carter Center, plays a central role in achieving this goal. Between January and March 2011 194 cases of dracunculiasis were reported from 93 villages and six counties in South Sudan. Of these, 43 were from Kapoeta North.

== Miscellaneous ==
In June 2009 the Norwegian Peoples Aid organization donated 66,000 Sudanese Pounds to six farmers groups from the Lomeyan, Lokwamor, Paringa, Najie, Korkomuge and Chumakori payams. The money was to be used to buy seeds and agricultural tools, and to cover other expenses. In the February 2011 referendum on becoming independent of Sudan, 99.93% of the 46,741 voters in Kapoeta North voted in favor.
