= List of mountains in Uganda =

This is a list of mountains in Uganda.

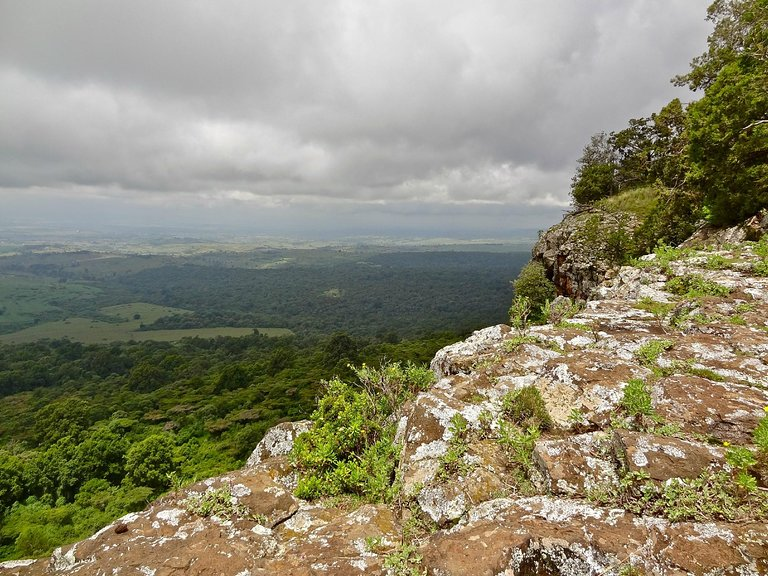
Mount Elgon

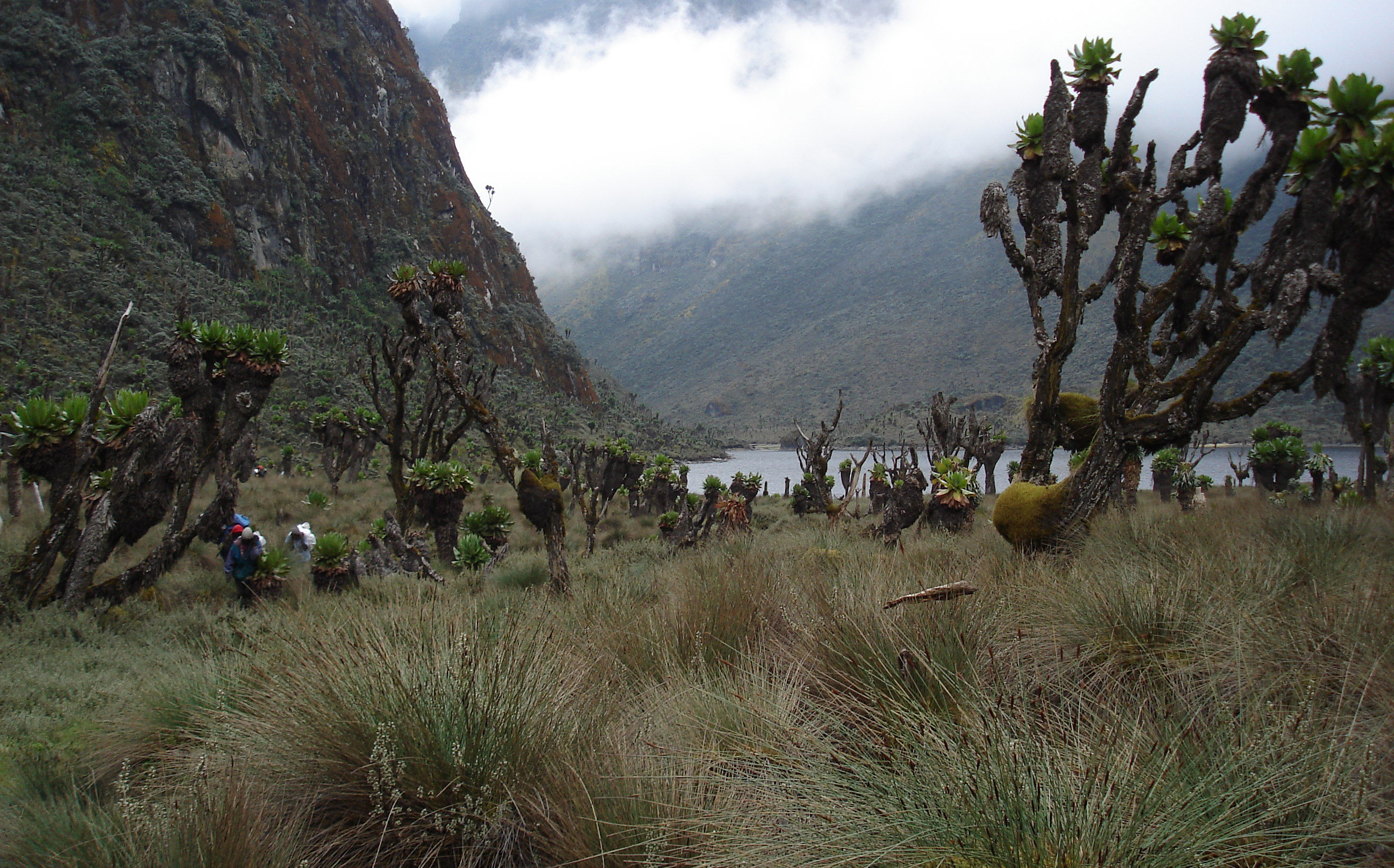
Lake Bujuku in the Rwenzori range

- Mount Elgon (4,321 m)
- Mount Gahinga (3,474 m)
- Mount Kadam (3,063 m)
- Mount Muhavura (4,127 m)
- Mount Moroto (3,083 m)
- Mount Morungole (2,750 m)
- Mount Sabyinyo (3,674 m)
- Mount Speke (4,890 m)
- Mount Stanley (5,109 m)
- Mount Zulia (2,149 m)
