= Diocese of Torit =

Roman Catholic diocese in South Sudan

Diocese of Torit Dioecesis Toritensis

Location
- Country: South Sudan

Statistics
- Area: 82,542 km^{2} (31,870 sq mi)
- Population: Total; Catholics: 1,673,100; 1,139,835 (68.1%)
- Parishes: 20

Information
- Denomination: Catholicism
- Sui iuris church: Latin Church
- Rite: Roman
- Established: May 2, 1983
- Cathedral: Cathedral of Saints Peter and Paul
- Secular priests: 36

Current leadership
- Bishop: Emmanuel Bernardino Lowi Napeta

Map
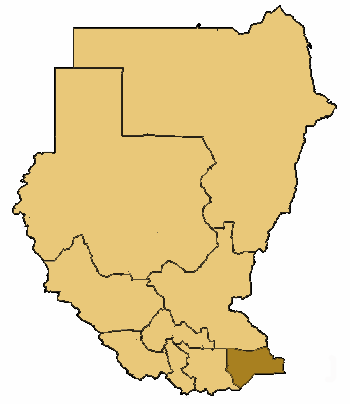
- Location of the diocese within Sudan and South Sudan

Ecclesiastical province of Juba with the territory of the diocese of Torit

The Roman Catholic Diocese of Torit (Latin: Toriten(sis)) is a diocese located in Torit in the ecclesiastical province of Juba in South Sudan.

== History ==
The Diocese of Torit is a suffragan diocese of the Archdiocese of Juba. It was detached from Juba on May 2, 1983. The first Bishop Paride Taban was appointed on July 2, 1983. The Diocese covers 82,542 km^{2}. and has a population of 1,550,000 of whom around 70% (1,085,000) are Catholics. It has three deaneries: Western Deanery, bordering Uganda, Central Deanery, bordering north south of Uganda and Eastern Deanery, bordering Kenya and part of Ethiopia. Due to the civil war from 1984 to 2005, the diocese operated from Nairobi. After signing the peace agreement, the see of the diocese opened in Torit. The Diocese serves 15 parishes, 36 Eucharistic Centers, and 240 other stations not regularly visited by priests, but by lay leaders and catechists.

The CDOT just as Eastern Equatoria State is bordered in the East by Ethiopia, in the South by Kenya and Uganda, in the West by Central Equatoria State and lastly in the North by desert area that runs over into Jonglei and Upper Nile States. Education Education Soon after the total destruction of educational infrastructures and the collapsed of the education system in most part of Eastern Equatoria State in 1992 the CDOT revived education activities along the borders with Ugandan and Kenyan using their syllabuses and students taking their national examinations for convenience and certification purposes. At the moment CDOT runs two secondary schools (Narus and Isohe), one vocational school (Narus), and 13 primary schools (Boma, Nanyangachor, Narus, Lolim, Isoke, Ikotos, Iboni, and Loa and a number of bush schools in East and North Kapoeta Counties). Health After an interruption in health services the diocese established the health department in 1994.

CDOT runs Primary healthcare centers (PHCC) in Lotimor, Nanyangachor, Narus, Kapoeta, Lorema, Magwi, Isoke, Parajok and Nimule. Most of these have capacity for inpatients and a mobile car for referral to hospitals in Chukudum, Nimule, Kakuma (Kenya in the refugee camp run by UNHCR) and recently to Torit Hospitals Water Hygiene and Sanitation Education (WHYSE).

== Leadership ==
Bishops of Torit

- Paride Taban (2 July 1983 – 7 February 2004)
- Akio Johnson Mutek (9 June 2007 – 15 March 2013)
- Stephen Ameyu Martin Mulla (3 January 2019 – 12 December 2019), appointed Archbishop of Juba
- Bishop Emmanuel Bernardino Lowi Napeta (since 8 November 2022)

== See also ==
- Roman Catholicism in South Sudan

== Sources ==
- Diocese of Torit on GCatholic.org
