= Kapoeta Airport =

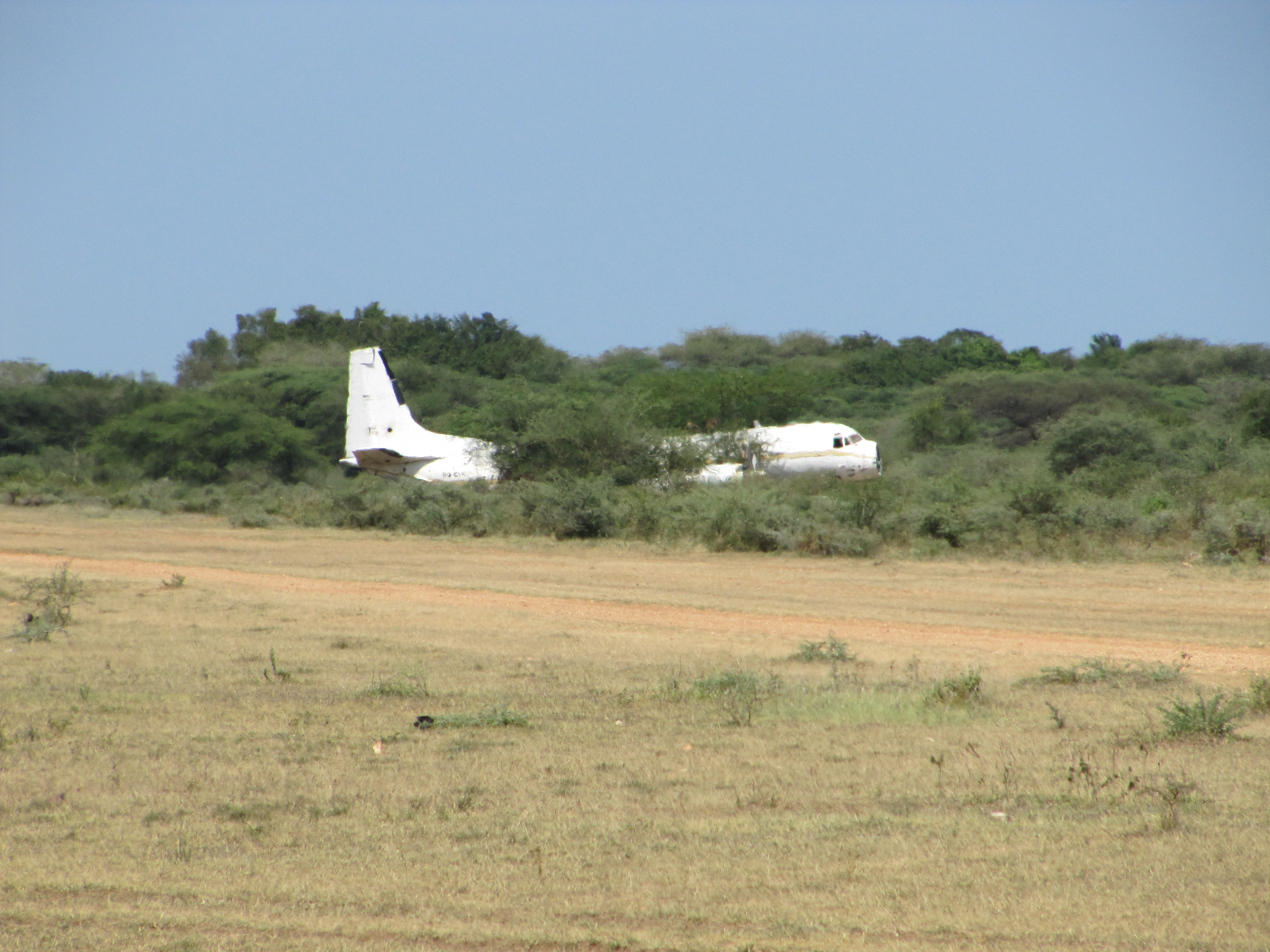
- IATA: n/a; ICAO: HSKP

Summary
- Airport type: Public, Civilian
- Owner: Civil Aviation Authority of South Sudan
- Serves: Kapoeta, South Sudan
- Location: Kapoeta, South Sudan
- Elevation AMSL: 2,221 ft / 677 m
- Coordinates: 04°46′48″N 33°35′06″E

Map
- Location of Kapoeta Airport in South Sudan

Runways
Direction	Length		Surface
Direction	ft	m	Surface
14/32 (approx.)	3,470	1,058	Unpaved

Kapoeta Airport is an airport serving Kapoeta in South Sudan.

== Location ==
Kapoeta Airport (IATA: n/a, ICAO: HSKP) is located in Kapoeta South County in Eastern Equatoria, in the town of Kapoeta, near the International borders with Kenya and Uganda. The airport is located approximately 3 kilometres (1.9 mi), north of the central business district of Kapoeta.

This location lies approximately 221 kilometres (137 mi), by air, east of Juba International Airport, South Sudan's largest airport. The geographic coordinates of this airport are: 4° 46' 48.00"N, 33° 35' 6.00"E (Latitude: 4.7800; Longitude: 33.5850). Kapoeta Airport is situated 677 metres (2,221 ft) above sea level. The airport has a single unpaved runway that is 1058 m. in length.

== Overview ==
Kapoeta Airport is a small civilian and military airport that serves the town of Kapoeta and surrounding communities.

== See also ==
- Kapoeta
- Eastern Equatoria
- List of airports in South Sudan
