= Narus =

Narus may refer to:

- Narus, South Sudan, a Payam in Eastern Equatoria State of South Sudan
- Narus River, Kapoeta, a river in Kapoeta East County of South Sudan
- Narus River, Uganda, a river in the north of Uganda
- Narus Inc., a vendor of big data analytics for cybersecurity
