= Losilang =

Administrative region in Uganda

Losilang is a Sub-County in Kotido District of northern Uganda. It lies to the northeast of Kotido town. It has an area of 144.3 square kilometres (55.7 sq mi). Estimated population in 2009 was 17,000. Losilang was one of the early centers of the Karamojong cluster of related people. From here, the Toposa people drifted northeast and then west to settle in Kapoeta by 1830. In more recent times, Losilang has been the scene of clashes between armed warriors and Uganda People's Defence Force (UPDF) troops seeking illegal arms and property. On 19 May 2006 there were several hours of fighting, between 200 and 500 houses were burned down and several civilians died.
