= Mount Zulia =

Mountain in Uganda

- Location within Uganda

Highest point
- Elevation: 2,149 m (7,051 ft)
- Listing: Mountains of Uganda
- Coordinates: 4°07′26″N 33°59′04″E

Geography
- Country: Uganda
- Region: Karamoja
- Protected area: Kidepo Valley National Park

Mount Zulia (or Lotholia) is in the Karamoja region in the north-east of Uganda in the Kidepo Valley National Park. Mount Morungole and the Labwor and Dodoth Hills, which reach heights in excess of 2,000 metres (6,600 ft), are nearby. Mount Zulia is 2,149 metres (7,051 ft) high.

The Toposa people of Eastern Equatoria say that they originated in the Lotholia Mountains, moving away during a severe drought that killed both people and animals. The forests of the mountain are partly protected by the Mount Zulia Forest Reserve.

== Geography and topography ==
Mount Zulia forms part of the rugged uplands of north-eastern Uganda, within the broader Kidepo landscape (including savannah plains, river valleys, and mountain blocks). UNDP describes the Zulia Central Forest Reserve as spanning an altitude range of about 1,040 to 2,148 metres above sea level and including varied habitats on mountain slopes and ridges.

== Geology ==
Regional geology sources describe syenite complexes in Uganda, including Zulia, as eroded remnants of earlier volcanic systems.

== Ecology ==
Vegetation in the Kidepo landscape includes grassland and savannah woodland in valley floors, with montane forest and related vegetation types on higher mountain slopes. The Zulia Central Forest Reserve is described as supporting distinctive vegetation types associated with higher elevations and slope habitats in Karamoja.

== Conservation ==
The Zulia Central Forest Reserve was established in 1942 and covers about 102,893 hectares (about 1,029 km^{2}). UNDP notes overlap between parts of Zulia Forest Reserve and Kidepo Valley National Park.

Kidepo Valley National Park surveys cited in the park management plan report high species richness for the protected area, including at least 86 mammal species, 472 bird species, and 692 plant species.

== See also ==
- Kidepo Valley National Park
- Geography of Uganda
- List of mountains in Uganda
