= Didinga people =

Ethnic group

The Didinga (also spelled DiDinga) are a Surmic ethnic group that occupy the Didinga Mountains region in Budi County, Eastern Equatoria State in South Sudan. They live in the valleys, on the plateaus and slopes, and on the adjacent plains of the region. Their neighbours include the Toposa, Turkana, Boya, Ketebo, Logir, Ik, Dodos and Dongotona peoples–groups with whom the Didinga have had frequent conflicts due to economic pressures.

== Language and history ==
Driberg's 1922 study states that "The Didinga have a very strong tradition that they arrived at their present habitat from the S.E., travelling through country now inhabited by Dodoth round the S. Shore of Lake Rudolph. The date of this migration is entirely unknown, but it was probably comparatively recent. In the XVI century this area was inhabited by tribes of the Shilluk cluster until they were dispersed by semi-Hamitic invaders from the East. These gradually tended to extend and drift southwards (vide the Masai), and it is possible that some ancient metal workings traceable in old slag-heaps at Latome, Lotyathe and other parts of the present Didinga country may be attributed to these XVI century invaders." Driberg published a small collection of their songs and poems.

The Didinga, Boya, Tennet, Murle and Mursi of Southwest Ethiopia share a language that distinguishes them from all other groups in the Sudan. Their language, often called the Murle-Didinga language, is also spoken by a group living in southwest Ethiopia. The Didinga claim to have lived in southwest Ethiopia two hundred years ago. During their migration to the Didinga Hills, the Didinga, Murle, Tennet and Boya were one group. They lived in harmony in Sudan until a hunting-party dispute caused the Murle to leave. Later, a famine caused the Boya to withdraw. Today, though the groups have separated, their language remains the same. Their most urban town is Chukudum, a historic town that hosted the first Sudan People's Liberation Movement (SPLM) National Convention in 1994.

During the Second Sudanese Civil War (1983–2005) tensions with the Dinka people built up after the Dinka-dominated SPLA forces moved into the area in 1985. They came to a head in 1999 when the Didinga officer Peter Lorot was passed over for promotion in favour of a Dinka, assassinated his rival and took to the woods with his supporters. The fighting with Lorot's forces displaced about 16,800 people from Chukudum to nearby villages in the highlands. The "Chukudom Crisis" was resolved in August 2002 during a Peace Conference organized by the New Sudan Council of Churches. An attempt by the SPLA in June 2006 to disarm Lorot's militia was ignored, with the group threatening to start fighting again.

== Lifestyle ==
For many years, the Didinga enjoyed a quiet, rural life. They took great pride in raising cattle and owned large herds that were supervised by the young single Didinga men. However, in 1963, a political disturbance which lasted until 1973 caused many Didinga to leave their cattle behind and to migrate to Uganda. While in Uganda, for the first time in their lives, Didinga were exposed to large-scale farming, and their children were introduced to education. These experiences created in the people the desires to make money and to gain knowledge, things which had been unimportant in the Hills.

When they returned to Sudan in 1973, the people were filled with a new vision for a more advanced life. They hoped to incorporate into their own culture many of the ideas and concepts they had learned in Uganda. They were met, however, with a drastic decrease in the numbers in their herds: clansmen who had remained in the Hills had failed to restock the cattle during the disturbance. Today, many Didinga are still working to enlarge their herds. They acquire cattle either through the exchange of grain or beer, or with money.

At present, farming and the desire for an education are as important to the Didinga as the herding of cattle is. The traditional values associated with raising cattle remain embedded in all Didinga. Many still take great pleasure in owning large herds. Their new-found hope for change that was brought back from their temporary migration also remains instilled in their daily lives. The Didinga use their cattle not only as a means of wealth, but also for their milk that is consumed daily and made into butter. Didinga also consume fresh blood drawn from the necks of cattle with miniature arrows. The Didinga do not fish at all, because the eating of fish is taboo in their culture.

The Didinga live in scattered homesteads, with each clan grouped together. Homes are round with cone-shaped roofs. During certain seasons and during grazing periods, the Didinga also live in rustic camps. An important aspect of Didinga society is the organisation of 'Nyekerehet' (age-grades) for boys. Every three to five years, boys who are around eight years old are placed together to form a new "age-grade." These boys work and play together until they are married.

== Beliefs ==
Their traditional beliefs and religious practices include having a tribal rainmaker who is entrusted with performing certain rituals to bring rain. Didinga also worship and sacrifice to spirits and gods and place great importance upon the worship of dead ancestors.
