= Pakok =

Pakok, formerly Khor Shum, is a community in South Sudan on the border with Ethiopia.

== History ==
In 1985, a group of 500-600 army officers and soldiers from Uganda fled to South Sudan as refugees after a coup. The Sudan People's Liberation Army (SPLA) gave them the choice of remaining to fight for South Sudan independence from the north, or return to Uganda. Almost all chose to remain, and were sent for training to SPLA bases in Ethiopia. The bases were tolerated by the Ethiopian government, which was hostile to the Khartoum regime. In 1988 the Ugandans were brought to Khor Shum, where they built a camp and lived there from February 1988 until November 1992. They were assigned work planting crops and building huts for an SPLA base, and also portering food from the refugee camp at Dimma.

During the Second Sudanese Civil War (1983–2005) many civilians fled to Ethiopia. Several thousand unaccompanied boys were trained by the SPLA, then used to help prop up the Mengistu regime. When that regime collapsed in May 1991, the SPLA began moving hundreds of thousands of refugees back to Sudan, many of them temporarily settled at Nasir, Pochalla, and Pakok (the new name for Khor Shum). Refugees from Fugnido camp migrated to Pochala while those in Dimma walked to Pakok. Many of the Ugandan crops were destroyed when the first repatriates arrived, but some were harvested and sent to SPLA troops in the field. By the end of 1991 the United Nations registered slightly less than 10,000 refugees at Pakok, including 2,548 unaccompanied minors. In November 1991 a nutritional survey showed that two thirds of the boys at Pakok were moderately malnourished.

In January 2007, more refugees from Dimma camp in Ethiopia arrived in Pakok after walking for 13 hours. Many of them were male students, who had left Dimma because their educational allowances for the 2006-2007 academic year had been reduced and because they did not want to wait any longer before returning home. Most of the returnees made their way by foot to the nearby village of Boma, where the United Nations High Commission for Refugees (UNHCR) and the South Sudan Relief and Rehabilitation Commission (SSRRC) registered 612 returnees, mainly from Upper Nile and Jonglei States.
