= Chukudum =

- Location in South Sudan
- Coordinates: 4°15′22″N 33°27′22″E
- Country: South Sudan
- Region: Equatoria
- State: Eastern Equatoria
- County: Budi County
- Time zone: UTC+2 (CAT)

Chukudum is a town in Budi County, Eastern Equatoria, South Sudan. It is located at the base of the Didinga Mountains and is home to the Didinga tribe. It faces issues such as poor infrastructure, conflict, and security challenges exacerbated by its history during the Second Sudanese Civil War.

== Location ==
The town lies at the base of the Didinga Mountains, which are often shrouded in clouds, in spectacularly beautiful country. It is accessible only by a rough track. In May 2009 road construction resumed after being interrupted when the local people complained that the road was too wide, taking up too much land.

== People ==
The predominant tribe is the Didinga. Many people keep cattle as well as farming. The main crops are sorghum, simsim, maize, tobacco, and beans. Sources of conflict include cattle raiding, armed robbery, disputes over bride prices and disputes over farmland, water and pasturage. Disputes with internally displaced people and armed deserters from the army are also ongoing problems. A June 2007 report for UNHCR noted that most families did not have latrines, and there were no public latrines. The town hosts a hospital and a primary health unit, as well as two primary schools and two secondary schools. Women had to travel 10–12 km to obtain firewood, and are at danger from attack by cattle raiders. Security is still poor. In February 2011 two Catholic priests from the Torit diocese were ambushed at Ngarera on the road between Camp 15 and Chukudum among other instances of the same stake just to mention a few. More than six men in military uniforms sprayed their vehicle with bullets before being scared away by an approaching minibus.

== Civil war ==
The villagers suffered during the Second Sudanese Civil War (1983-2005), with considerable damage to infrastructure. In December 1998, the Norwegian People's Aid NGO, which runs the medical center in the town, reported that a Sudanese government Antonov aircraft dropped six bombs on the town, but did not cause any casualties. Relations with the Sudan People's Liberation Army (SPLA) were also strained, with soldiers and Didinga people being killed in clashes. In August 2002 the Chukudum Crisis Peace Conference was held to try to resolve issues between the SPLA and the Didinga community. Tensions had built up since 1985, when the Dinka-dominated SPLA forces moved into the area. They had come to a head in 1999 when the Didinga officer Peter Lorot was passed over for promotion in favor of a Dinka, assassinated his rival and took to the woods with his supporters. An attempt by the SPLA in June 2006 to disarm Lorot's militia was ignored, with the group threatening to start fighting again.
