= Didinga Hills =

Mountain in South Sudan

- Location within South Sudan

Geography
- Country: South Sudan
- State: Eastern Equatoria
- Range coordinates: 4°20′N 33°35′E

The Didinga Hills are an upland area in Eastern Equatoria of South Sudan, lying mainly within Budi County.

The Nakodok, Narus and Loyoro rivers originate in the east of Didinga Hills, flowing eastward into Greater Kapoeta and discharging into the swampy area northeast of Narua. The rivers flood during the rainy season, but ceases to flow at other times. In the dry season the Toposa from Greater Kapoeta would drive their cattle to the Didinga Hills for water and pasture until the rains began in Toposa land. In the past, this practice was carried out by agreement between the two communities, with a gift being made in exchange for the right to access the pasturage. With the proliferation of guns and breakdown of order during the civil war, the traditional protocols were ignored and violence became common.

The village of Chukudum lies at the base of the Didinga Mountains, which are often shrouded in clouds, in spectacularly beautiful country. It is accessible only by a rough track.
