= Greater Kapoeta =

Eastern Equatoria State – Greater Kapoeta to the east

Districts of East Equatoria: 3: Shokodom (Budi) 4: Kapoeta

Greater Kapoeta is the name given to the eastern half of the erstwhile Eastern Equatoria State in South Sudan, at one time an administrative region with headquarters in the town of Kapoeta. Greater Kapoeta was divided between Kapoeta County and Budi County, named after the Buya and Didinga (BU-DI) people. Kapoeta County was later split into Kapoeta North, South and East counties.

== People ==
The region is home to the three pastoralist communities of Buya, Diding'a and Toposa people, who have a history of feuding and cattle raiding. In an attempt to eliminate further conflict, a peace conference was held in September 2009 in the Lauro payam in Budi County. The meeting was organized by the Southern Sudan Peace Commission, chaired by Brigadier General Louis Lobong Lojore. Demarcation of traditional boundaries between the communities was seen as an essential step, to be undertaken by the government. The communities also agreed to revive joint peace centres such as Miji, Ngauro, Kamulach, Kaliba, Namorunyang, Nawoyapak and Lochorkanyatom.

== Economy ==
The region has poor communications. A herder in a location such as Mogos in the semi-arid Kapeota East may have to walk for three days to the nearest market in Kapoeta town to sell his cattle, with no guarantee of getting an acceptable price. The Greater Kapoeta Cooperative Development Agency was set up in the late 2000s to assist with marketing. In the run-up to the 2011 referendum on secession of South Sudan from Sudan, staff had difficulty due to the long distances between centers, shortages of food and water, and problems getting people to register since they were busy with the harvest.

Following two years with poor rainfall, an April 2011 report by the Government of South Sudan stated that parts of Greater Kapoeta were in an acute food and livelihood crisis, with some risk of a humanitarian crisis if there was no improvement in the situation. Insecurity in Greater Kapoeta had made it difficult for herders to access markets for essential supplies, and to sell livestock so they could acquire cereals. Livestock were also suffering from outbreaks of disease, compounding the problem.
