= Mount Morungole =

Mountain in Uganda

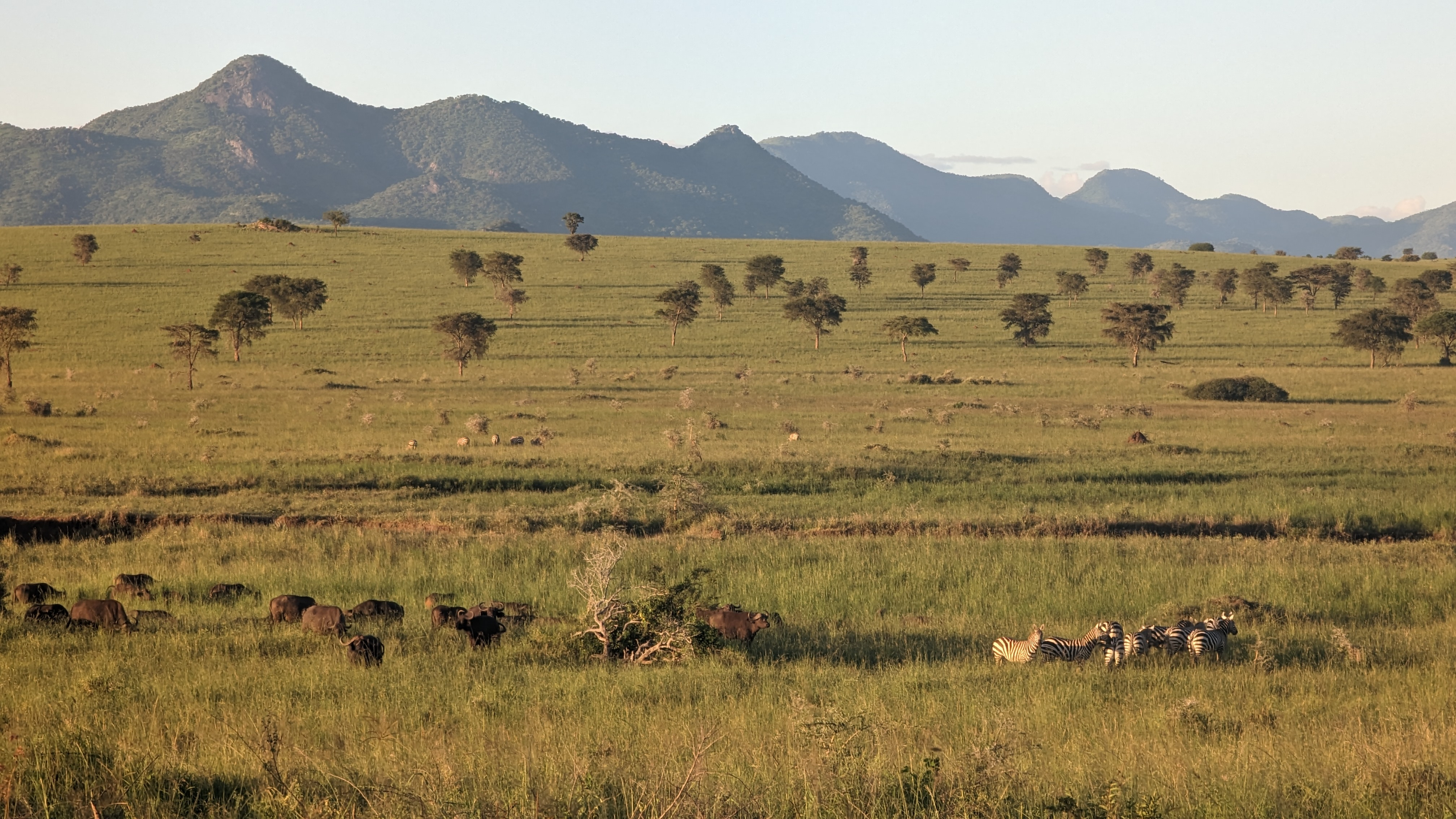
- Kidepo Valley National Park with Mount Morungole

Highest point
- Elevation: 2,749 m (9,019 ft)
- Prominence: 1,400 m (4,600 ft)
- Listing: Ribu
- Coordinates: 3°49′N 34°2′E

Geography
- Location within Uganda
- Location: Kidepo Valley National Park, Uganda

Geology
- Mountain type: Mountain

Mount Morungole is a mountain in Kidepo Valley National Park in north-east Uganda. It is in the rugged, semi-arid Karamoja region, near the border with Sudan. Neighbouring peaks include Mount Zulia, and the Labwor and Dodoth Hills reach heights in excess of 2,000 meters.

The local inhabitants were the Ik people, who were moved by a previous administration. They were attached to Mount Morungole, considering it a sacred place.
