= Tadamata =

Tadamata (or Tadama) was a town in the Roman province of Mauretania Caesariensis.

It was also the seat of a bishopric that, no longer being a residential see, is included in the Catholic Church's list of titular sees.

Its bishop David is mentioned among the bishops of Mauretania Cæsariensis in the Notitiae episcopatuum of 482. He is also 105th in the list of the bishops of that province whom Huneric summoned to the Synod of Carthage (484) and subsequently exiled. David's name is followed by the word probatus, showing that he died in exile for his Catholic faith.
