= Akio Johnson Mutek =

South Sudanese Roman Catholic bishop

Akio Johnson Mutek (January 2, 1958 – March 17, 2013) was the Roman Catholic bishop of the Roman Catholic Diocese of Torit, South Sudan.

Ordained to the priesthood in 1988, Mutek was named bishop in 1999 and died in office.
