= Toposa people =

Ethnic group of South Sudan

Toposa
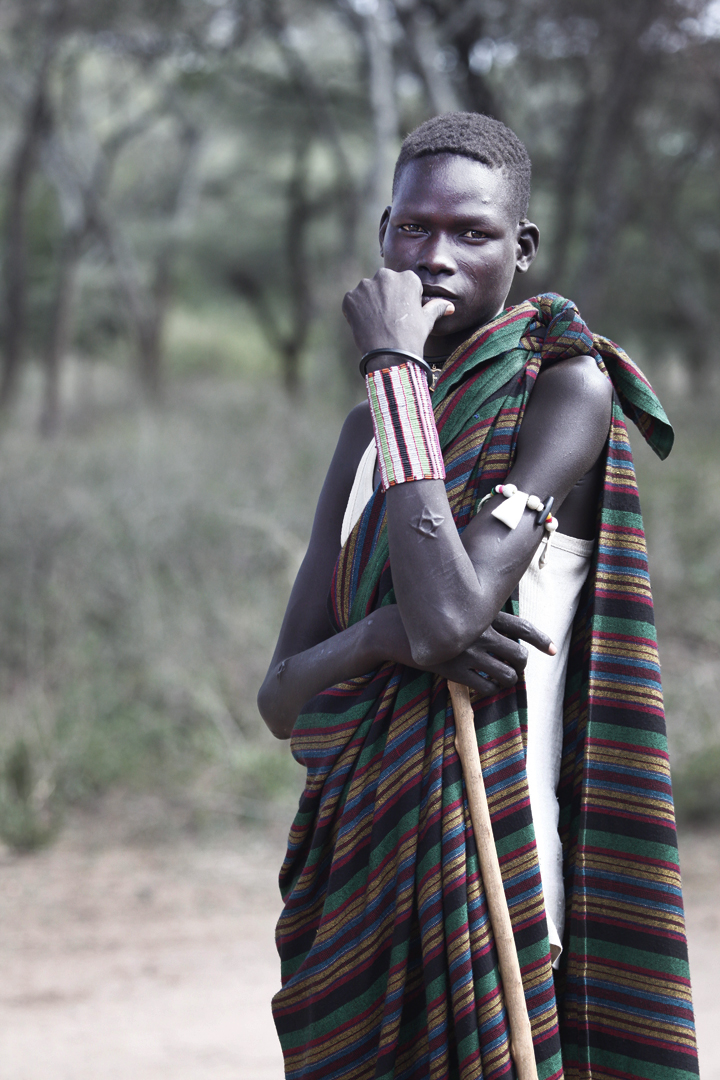
- A young Toposa man

Regions with significant populations
- South Sudan

Languages
- Toposa

Related ethnic groups
- Karamojong people, Turkana people, Dongiro people, Jiye people
- The Toposa are known for their pastoral lifestyle and their involvement in the ivory trade in the past.

The Toposa are a Nilotic ethnic group in South Sudan, living in the Greater Kapoeta region of Eastern Equatoria state. They have traditionally lived by herding cattle, sheep and goats, and in the past were involved in the ivory trade. They have a tradition of constant low-level warfare, usually cattle raids, against their neighbors.

During the Second Sudanese Civil War (1983–2005) the Toposa helped the Sudan People's Liberation Army (SPLA) at times, and at other times helped the Government of Sudan. After the war, sporadic clashes with neighboring tribes continued. The Toposa way of life is slowly being modernized and traditional social organization is eroding.

== Location ==
Eastern Equatoria State – Greater Kapoeta to the east

The Toposa people live in Greater Kapoeta, beside the Singaita and Lokalyen rivers, and have a ritual center at Loyooro River. For seasonal grazing they migrate to Moruangipi and sometimes east into the Ilemi Triangle. Toposa people also live in the southeast of Jonglei State. Their main settlements include Kapoeta, Riwoto and Narus. The land is semi-arid and rugged, with hills and ridges separated by shallow plains and seasonal streams. Vegetation is limited to shrubs and short grass.

The Toposa mainly rely on cattle, sheep and goats, from which they obtain milk, blood, meat and leather. During the wet season the animals graze near the villages. When the rains end, the men take the herds to dry season pasturage, then slowly bring them back, grazing along the way, to arrive in the village when the next rainy season starts. Some areas of good pasturage cannot be used because of lack of drinking water.

The women also engage in limited agriculture in the river valleys. The main crop is sorghum, grown on fertile clay soils. Depending on conditions there may be severe shortages or large surpluses. The Toposa country has low, unpredictable rainfall. The streams are torrential, flowing only in the rainy season.

== Culture ==
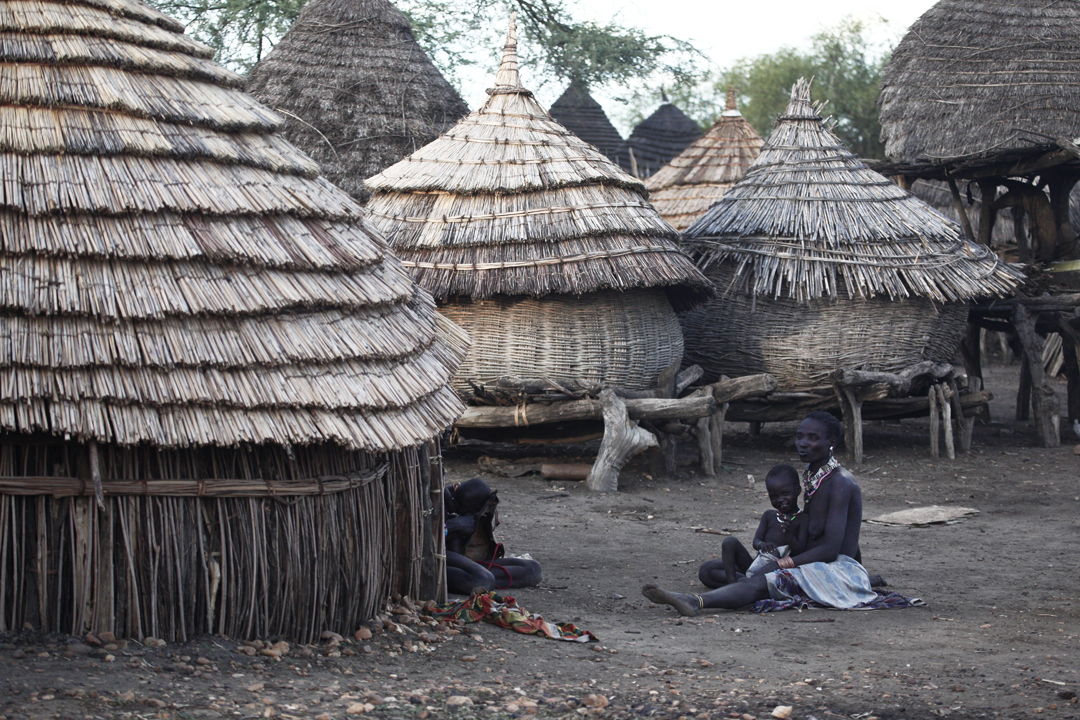
A Toposa village

The Toposa language is a Nilotic language. It belongs to the Turkana group, which also includes Karamojong of Uganda, Nyangatom of Ethiopia and Turkana of Kenya. The Turkana and Toposa languages are so close that they are mutually intelligible. Other names for the Toposa language are Akara, Kare, Kumi, Taposa and Topotha.

The Toposa economy and social life revolve around herding livestock, including cattle, camels, donkeys, goats and sheep. The Toposa also pan for gold and other precious minerals in the stream beds. Boys are first given care of goats and sheep, then graduate to looking after cattle when they come of age. They may travel considerable distances seeking water and pasturage. Possession of cattle, along with possession of a loaded gun, are the main measure of status and wealth. Cattle are central to Toposa culture. The Toposa have always competed for water and pasturage with their neighbors, and have always engaged in cattle rustling. The traditional Toposa weapon was a long throwing spear, used in raids in conjunction with a shield. The attacker would run forward zigzagging to dodge missiles, hurl his spear and then retreat, ready to ambush a pursuing enemy.

The Toposa share the habit of constant low-level warfare, mainly to capture cattle, with their neighbors. According to P.H. Gulliver, writing in 1952, "Turkana made war on all their neighbours with the exception of the Jie, with whom they occasionally allied themselves against the Karamajong and the Dodoth. Karamajong similarly made war on all their neighbors with the exception of the Dudoth, with whom they occasionally allied themselves against the Jie. Jie claim friendship with the Toposa, but since they have no common boundaries, this would have been of little importance. Toposa and Donyiro did not fight each other, and are known to have formed an alliance against the Turkana. Toposa and Jiye were enemies".

Women are expected to remain at home farming, cooking, raising children and caring for the elderly. This division of labour can be inefficient. When an NGO introduced ox cultivation, at first they decided it would be easier to have men undertake the ploughing, although cultivation was women's work, than to have women intrude into the men's world of animal husbandry. Later they decided that women should be allowed to plough, but councils of elders rejected the notion. However, Toposa elders have limited power and the NGO went ahead and trained some women in ox ploughing, mostly widows and orphans. The experiment ended in 1985 when rebel forces arrived in the area, a disaster the elders naturally attributed to letting women manage cattle.

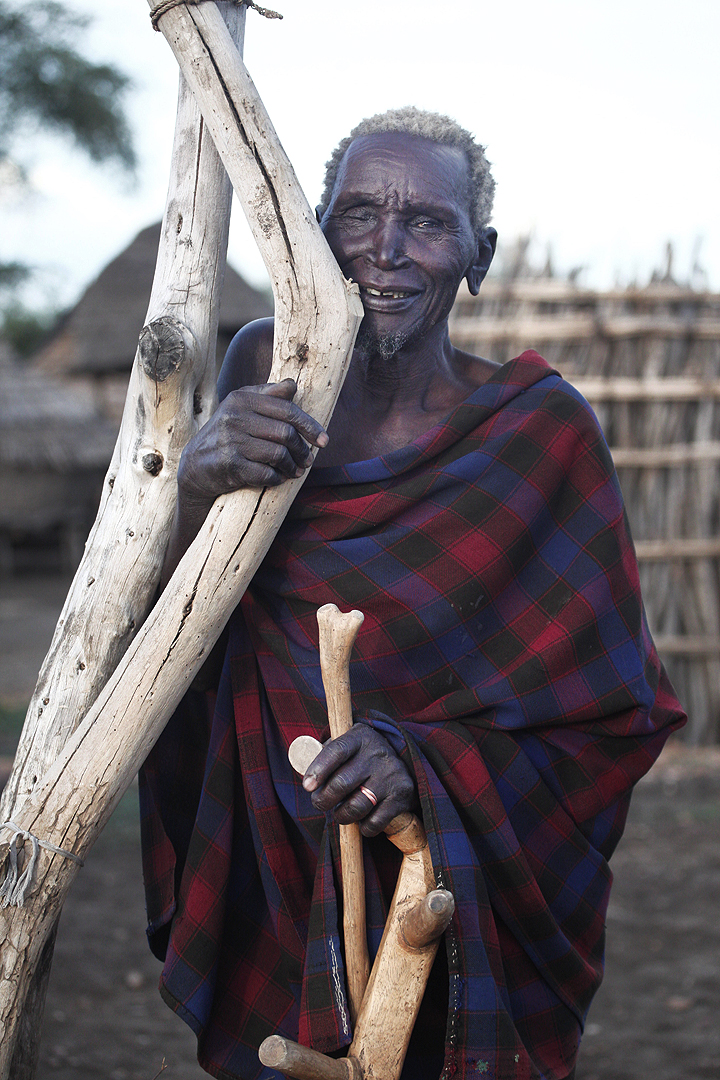
Toposa Elder

There is no clear political organization among the Toposa, although respect is paid to elders, chiefs and wise men. Most decisions about the clan or community are made in meetings attended only by the men, traditionally held in the dark hours before dawn. Matters of war and peace are decided by the sections councils of the elders, and the elders have sacral power over rain and drought. Captain King, a soldier of the Anglo-Egyptian Condominium who conquered the Toposa and ruled them for sixteen years, wrote: "There seems no doubt that prior to the advent of the Abyssinians even the idea of 'the Chief' was entirely unknown to the Topotha; the affairs of section and nation were regulated by the leaders of the ruling class, next but one above the warrior class... Gifted individuals such as Tuliabong or Lotukol, himself an elder, might by their force of character or prowess come to exercise unusual sway; but this was purely personal and there was no concept of it passing on his death to his son".

The Toposa believe in a supreme being and in ancestral spirits, who may assist in overcoming problems such as drought or epidemics of disease among their herds. They believe that men originally lived with "Nakwuge" in the sky, but many slid down a rope to earth. The rope then broke, separating them from heaven. As of 2000, perhaps 5% of the population could read. The Toposa culture is orally transmitted through songs, dance, music, poems and folklore. The Roman Catholic Diocese of Torit has been actively proselytizing among the Toposa, with some success.

== Early history ==
The Toposa belong to what has been called the "Karamojong cluster", which includes the Karamojong people of Uganda, the Dongiro people and Jiye people in south eastern South Sudan and south western Ethiopia, and the Turkana people of Kenya. The Toposa say that they originated in the Losolia Mountains in Uganda, moving away during a severe drought that killed both people and animals. A mortal quarrel between the Lwo and Tap (ancestors of the Taposa) people was thought to have upset the harmony of all life in northern Uganda, causing a great famine in 1587–1623. People were forced to move away for great distances, and those who remained were reduced to cannibalism. After leaving the heartland of the original group the ancestors of the Toposa settled at Losilang for a while, then drifted north in search of grazing. At Loyoro one group, the Nyangatom or Dongiro, went east, while the Mosingo and Kor sections of the Toposa, under pressure from the Turkana, moved west and had settled in Kapoeta by 1830.

The Lotuho have a tradition that their glorious kingdom of Imatari was destroyed by the Toposa some time around the start of the nineteenth century. An exiled king of the Lotuho had taken refuge in Toposaland, alone apart from his dog. He returned with a band of Toposa who encircled the city. When the people took refuge in the king's palace, which had strong walls, the Toposa pushed over the walls. After the battle the Lotuhu dispersed to villages in their current territory.

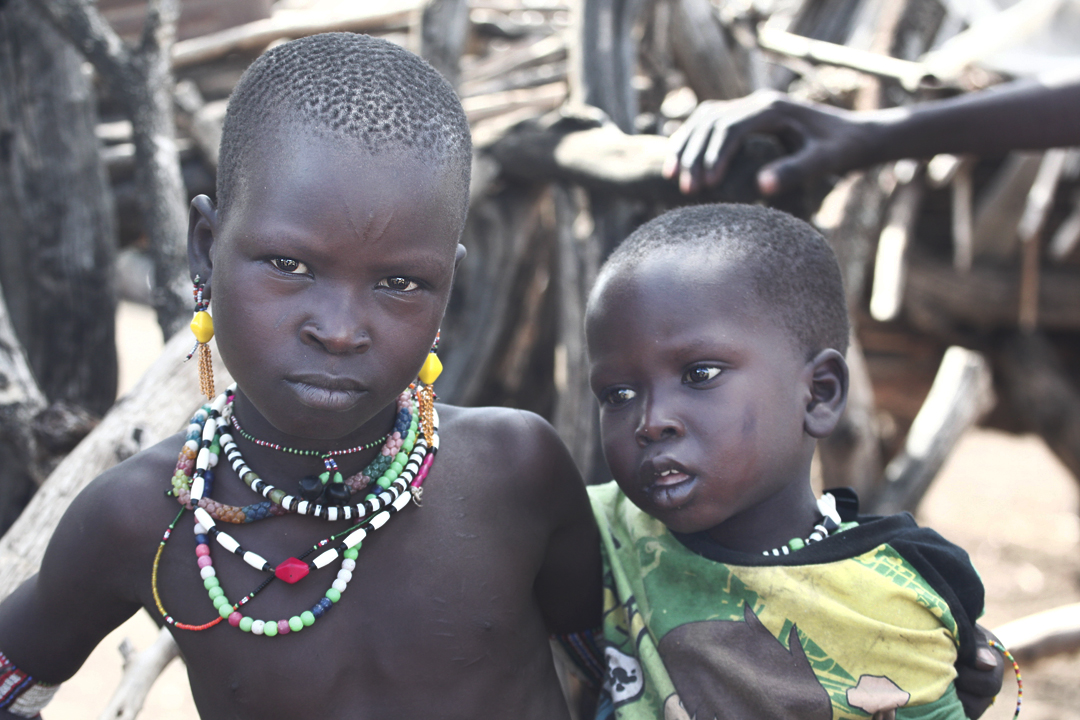
Toposa children

The Toposa became involved in the ivory trade in the late 19th and early 20th century. When Muhammad Ahmad established the Mahdiyya in 1881 the effect was to almost stop trade in ivory through Sudan to the north. Instead, exports began flowing through Ethiopia. As the British established a presence in Sudan and East Africa in the 1890s, they imposed regulations preventing export through their territory of immature or female ivory. In response, the Toposa turned increasingly to Maji in Ethiopia as a market for their ivory. Before World War I, Ethiopian influence stretched westward to the Kidepo River and beyond, and the ivory trade in this area was unaffected before 1927.

The Toposa developed close relations with Swahili traders, and intermarriage was common. The Toposa language became a lingua franca to the west of Lake Rudolf and throughout most of Eastern Equatoria. The trade route between Mbale in what is now Uganda and Maji ran through Toposa territory, not because it was the shortest route, but because it had dependable year-round water and donkeys could be readily obtained to carry ivory. Another route ran from Maji by way of Obawok, North Lafit, Lafon and the Badigeru swamp to the Nile. The ivory trade brought arms and ammunition from Ethiopia into Toposa territory, and these were used in joint cattle raids with the Swahili on neighbouring people.

The government of the Anglo-Egyptian Sudan "pacified" the Toposa territory in 1926/1927. Around the same time, the British East African government established posts in northern Turkanaland to the south. With steadily tightening restrictions, by the early 1930s the Toposa were the main remaining traders in ivory in the southern Sudanese lowlands. The Toposa country remained part of Sudan when that country became independent in 1956. The First Sudanese Civil War, which lasted from 1955 until 1972, had some impact on the Toposa. The Second Sudanese Civil War, breaking out in 1983, had a massive impact.

== Civil war ==
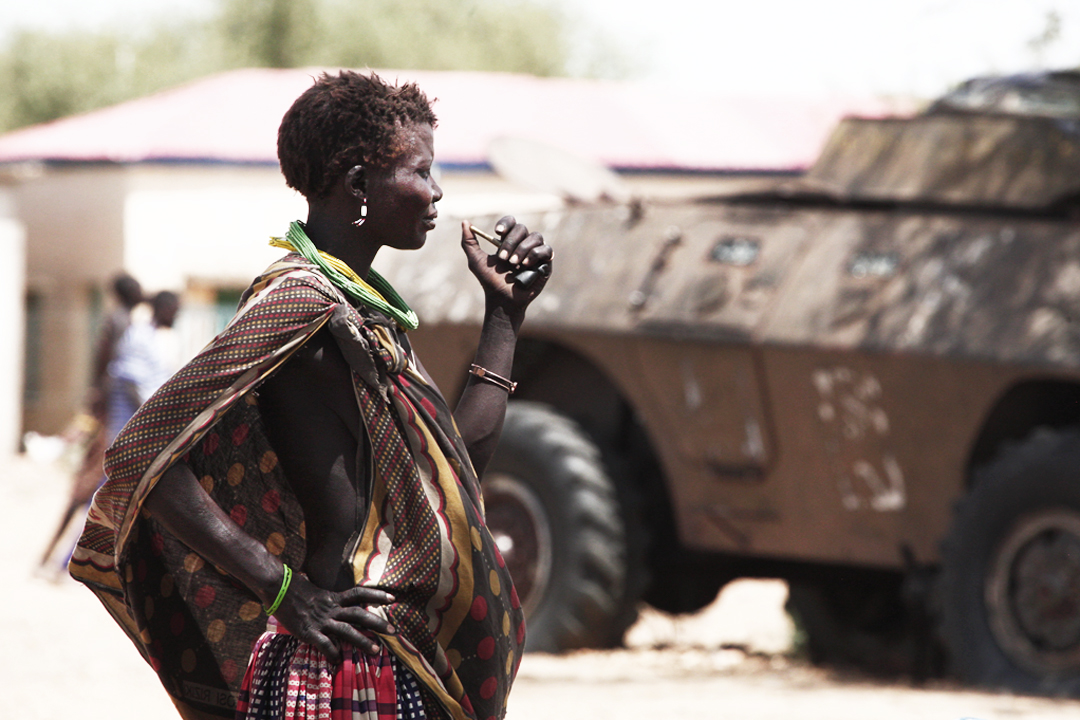
A Toposa woman with an armored vehicle in the background

During the Second Sudanese Civil War (1983–2005), the Toposa helped the Sudan People's Liberation Army (SPLA) at times, and at other times helped the Government of Sudan. The Toposa took a pragmatic approach, ostensibly siding with whoever gave them the most food and weapons. The SPLA alternated between violence and a more conciliatory approach to the Toposa. In 1985–1986 the SPLA attacked the civilian population of the Toposa, which it deemed "hostile". From 1987 the SPLA began an attempt to improve relations with the civilians. By 1988 some of the SPLA fighters were Toposa.

The Sudan Armed Forces sought to exploit traditional tensions between the Toposa and the Dinka people, to whom many of the SPLA leaders belonged, by supplying arms and ammunition to the Toposa. The firearms were used both to protect and increase wealth in animals, and became a symbol of wealth in themselves. During the 1990s the government of Sudan issued at least 50,000 small arms to the Toposa. In 1992 an AK-47 supplied by the government could be traded for ten cows, or the SPLA would provide G3 rifles in exchange for the AK-47s. Raids by the now well-armed Toposa on their neighbors, such as the Suri people of Ethiopia, increased drastically. Internally Displaced People (IDPs) moving through Toposa territory were subject to harassment by Toposa militia or bandits.

Kapoeta, a town in Toposa country, had been captured by the SPLA on 25 February 1988. The government armed the Toposa so they could fight the SPLA and also fight their traditional rivals the Lotuko people. In March 1992, Toposa militia staged attacks on relief columns attempting to bring supplies into Kapoeta. Refugees escaping from Pochalla, which had fallen to the Sudanese government, were attacked by Toposa militia as they made their way to Kapoeta. On 28 May 1992, the government regained Kapoeta in a surprise attack. The Toposa militia, with their knowledge of the terrain, played a central role. The evacuated civilians from Kapeota moved south to Narus, and from there over 20,000 went on to Lokichokio in Kenya, including 12,500 unaccompanied minors.

According to Amnesty International, the SPLA started a policy of "deliberate and arbitrary killing of civilians of Toposa ethnicity around Kapoeta ... in retaliation for the involvement of Toposa pro-government militia in the capture of Kapoeta and subsequent attacks on refugees fleeing the town". By the late 1990s, serious efforts were being made to reduce ethnic tensions. The Inter-African Bureau for Animal Resources sponsored harmonization workshops and meetings to resolve and prevent conflicts among pastoralist communities such as the Toposa and their neighbors. The participants in a Didinga-Turkana-Toposa-Nyangatom women's workshop in February 2000 undertook responsibility for discouraging further livestock rustling and raiding between the communities. The role of women, willing to cross the boundaries and unilaterally initiate peace talks, is without precedent and has been crucial. The Catholic Diocese of Torit was active in resolving conflicts among the Toposa, and conflicts between the Toposa, Didinga and Buya, and the Toposa Development Association had been established to promote development and peacebuilding among the Toposa.

== Recent events ==
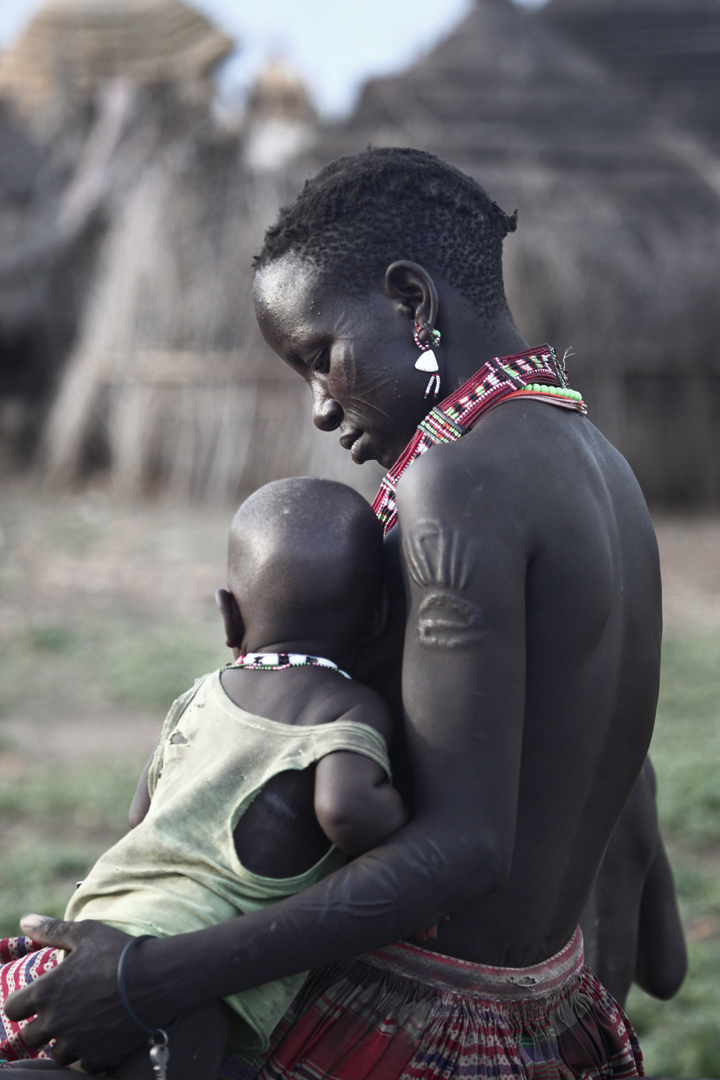
Toposa mother and child

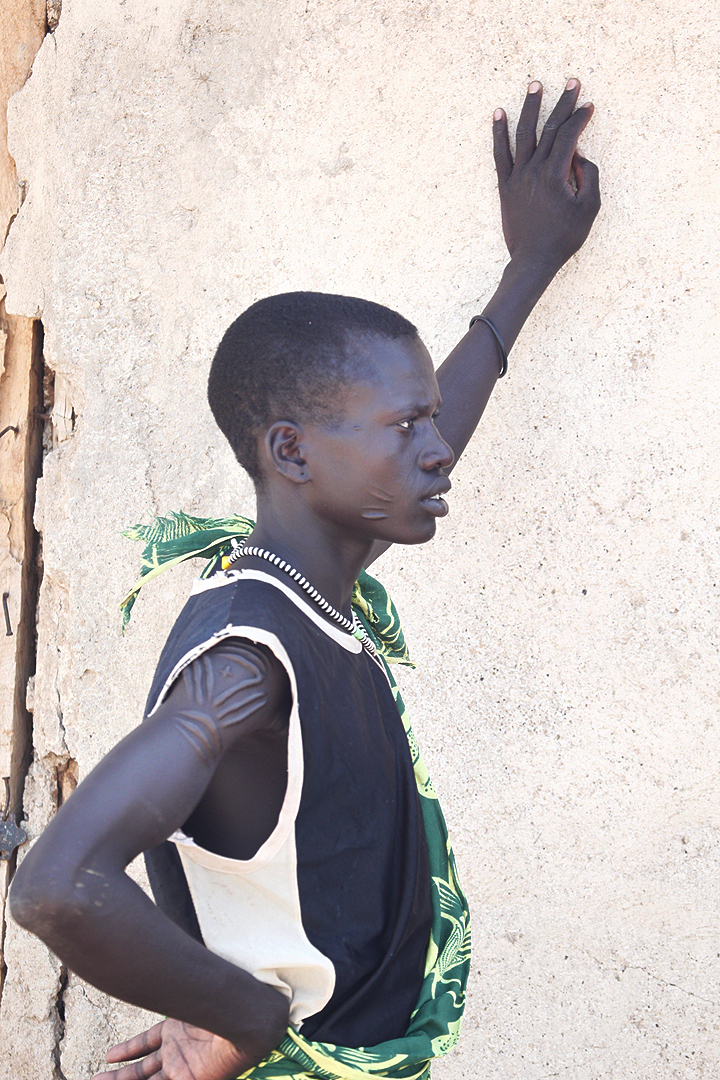
Young man

There has been a long history of conflict between the Toposa of Namorunyang and the Didinga of Budi County. In the dry season the Toposa would drive their cattle to the Didinga Hills for water and pasture until the rains began in Toposa land. In the past, this practice was carried out by agreement between the two communities, with a gift being made in exchange for the right to access the pasture. With the proliferation of guns and breakdown of order during the civil war, the traditional protocols were ignored and violence became common. In May 2007, Toposa tribesmen of Namorunyang raided the Ngauro Payam of Budi County, attacked a group that was resting after working in a collectively-owned field, and took 300 head of cattle and 400 goats or sheep. 49 women, 4 children and 5 men were killed, while others were wounded.

Nadapal, just across the border in Kenya, is a fertile area in which many Toposa took refuge during the civil war. With the end of the conflict, some Kenyans wanted the Toposa of the Nadapal area to return to South Sudan. The Toposa resisted, perhaps in part because they felt that tribes such as the Dinka and Nuer resented the Toposa backing of the Government of Sudan during the civil war, and they would therefore be treated as an unwelcome minority in Eastern Equatoria. There were ongoing clashes between the Toposa and Turkana in this area. A May 2010 report said the fighting between Toposa and Turkana had claimed over 40 lives and about 4,000 livestock had been stolen. It also said that George Echom, Deputy Governor of Eastern Equatorial State, had claimed that Nadapal belonged to South Sudan.

A 1982 report said there were 105,000 speakers of the Toposa language, including 95,000 along both sides of the Zingietta and Lokalyen rivers, and 10,000 in Ethiopia. More recent reports give a much higher population. In recent times, improvements have been made in health care, water supply and veterinary services. Many of the Toposa children now attend school in Narus and Natinga. These changes are profoundly affecting the traditional social organization. Women are starting to take a more prominent role in resolving disputes. The Governor of Eastern Equatoria, who took office in May 2010, is former Brigadier General Louis Lobong Lojore. He is a Toposa from Kapoeta East County.

== Sources ==
- Bright, William (1992). International encyclopedia of linguistics, Volume 3. Oxford University Press. ISBN 0-19-505196-3.
- "CROSS-BORDER PEACE & SPORTS PROGRAMME FOR YOUTH WARRIORS SUDAN/UGANDA/KENYA" (PDF). Seeds of Peace Africa. 2009–2011. Archived from the original (PDF) on 27 March 2012.
- Donham, Donald Lewis; James, Wendy (1986). The Southern marches of imperial Ethiopia: essays in history and social anthropology. CUP Archive. ISBN 0-521-32237-5.
- "Eastern Equatoria State Profile" (PDF). United Nations Mission in Sudan. Archived from the original (PDF) on 16 March 2012.
- Giri, Ananta Kumar (2003). A moral critique of development: in search of global responsibilities. Routledge. ISBN 0-415-27625-X.
- Johnson, Douglas Hamilton (2003). The root causes of Sudan's civil wars. Indiana University Press. ISBN 0-253-21584-6.
- "Kenya: Never ending war between Turkana and Sudanese". African Press International. 24 October 2009.
- Knighton, Ben (2005). The vitality of Karamojong religion: dying tradition or living faith?. Ashgate Publishing, Ltd. ISBN 0-7546-0383-0.
- König, Christa (2008). "Toposa". Case in Africa. Oxford University Press US. ISBN 978-0-19-923282-6.
- Lucheli, Isaiah (5 January 2010). "Boundary dispute that's an embarrassment to Kenya". The Standard. Kenya.
- Molloy, Lt. Colonel P. (February 1950). "The Bedigeru or Badingilu Swamp".
- Mukherjee, Ramkrishna (1985). Uganda, an historical accident?: class, nation, state formation. Africa World Press. ISBN 0-86543-016-0.
- "Nilo-Saharan, Eastern Sudanic, Nilotic, Eastern, Lotuxo-Teso, Teso-Turkana, Turkana". Ethnologue.
- Mwaûra, Cirû; Schmeidl, Susanne (2002). Early warning and conflict management in the Horn of Africa. The Red Sea Press. ISBN 1-56902-157-0.
- "OPEN LETTER: H. E. Lt. Gen Salva Kiir Mayardit". Gurtong. 12 June 2007. Archived from the original on 25 March 2012.
- Peterson, Scott (2001). Me Against My Brother: At War in Somalia, Sudan and Rwanda. Routledge. ISBN 0-415-93063-4.
- Rone, Jemera; Prendergast, John; Sorensen, Karen (1994). Civilian devastation: abuses by all parties in the war in southern Sudan. Human Rights Watch. ISBN 1-56432-129-0.
- "Report of Security and Public Order Committee on Ngauro Massacre in Budi County" (PDF). Committee of Security and Public Order SSLA / Juba. 28 May 2007.
- Schlee, Günther; Watson, Elizabeth E. (2009). Changing identifications and alliances in North-East Africa. Vol. 1. Berghahn Books. ISBN 978-1-84545-603-0.
- Simonse, Simon (1992). Kings of disaster: dualism, centralism, and the scapegoat king in southeastern Sudan. BRILL. ISBN 90-04-09560-8.
- Small Arms Survey (2007). Small Arms Survey 2007: Guns and the City. Cambridge University Press. ISBN 978-0-521-88039-8.
- Springwood, Charles Fruehling (2007). "The Toposa". Open fire: understanding global gun cultures. Berg. ISBN 978-1-84520-417-4.
- "SUDAN THE LOST BOYS: CHILD SOLDIERS AND UNACCOMPANIED BOYS IN SOUTHERN SUDAN" (PDF). Human Rights Watch. November 1994.
- "Toposa". Gurtong.
- "Toposa A language of Sudan". Ethnologue.
- "USAID/OTI Sudan Field Report". USAID. October 2004.
- Yongo-Bure, Benaiah (2007). Economic development of southern Sudan. University Press of America. ISBN 978-0-7618-3588-2.
