= Narus River, Kapoeta =

Location
- Country: South Sudan

The Narus River originates in the east of the Didinga Hills in the erstwhile Eastern Equatoria State, South Sudan. It flows eastward and discharges into the swampy area northeast of Narus. The river floods during the rainy season, but ceases to flow at other times. Gold has reportedly been panned in the river bed, probably washed down from the Didinga Hills. During the rainy season, the river virtually cuts the town of Narus in two as the riverbed fills and sometimes floods. The small market area is also cut into two halves, one on each side of the riverbed.
