= Budi County =

- County
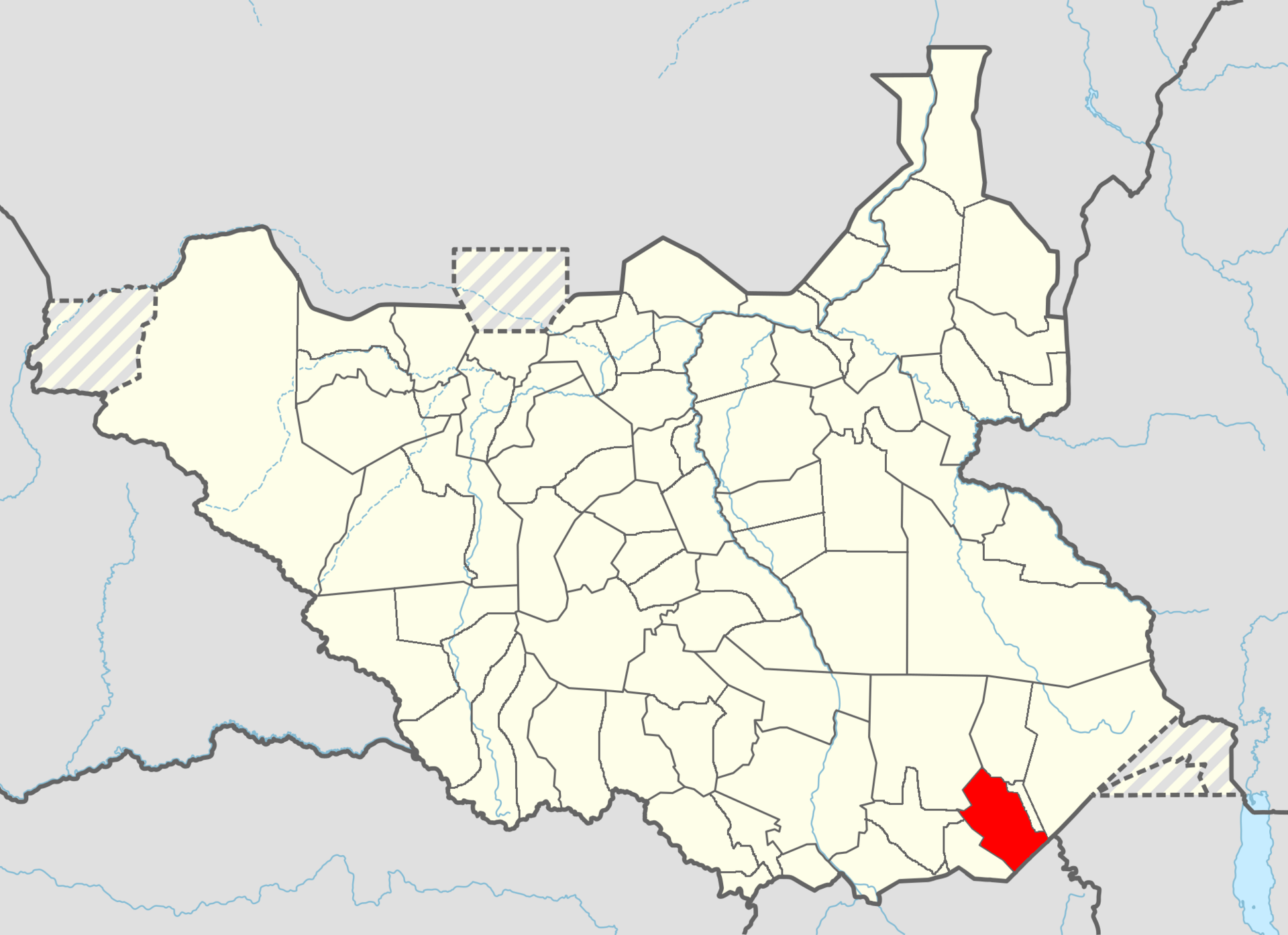
- Location in South Sudan
- Coordinates: 4°15′22″N 33°27′22″E
- Country: South Sudan
- Region: Equatoria
- State: Eastern Equatoria
- Headquarters: Chukudum

Government
  - County Commissioner: Amin Julius Ben

Area
  - Total: 2,211 sq mi (5,727 km^{2})

Population (2017 estimate)
  - Total: 153,314
  - Density: 69.33/sq mi (26.77/km^{2})
- Time zone: UTC+2 (CAT)

Budi County is an administrative area of Eastern Equatoria state in South Sudan, with headquarters in Chukudum.

== Location ==
Budi county is derived from two ethnic groups who inhabit the area (Buya and Didinga). It is located in Eastern Equatoria State, bordered by Uganda to the south and Kenya in the East. Budi county was under Kapoeta District in 1956. It was split off when Greater Kapoeta was divided between Kapoeta Counties and Budi County. Historically Budi county is the last stronghold of the Sudan's people's Liberation Army and movement (SPLA/M)during the liberation wars. In 1994, Chukudum, the headquarter of Budi hosted the first national SPLM Convention, which gave birth to modern administrative structures of the SPLM and South Sudan. Coincidentally, Dr. John Garang De Mabior the leader and founder of SPLM, untimely died in helicopter crash in Budi county in 2005.

Budi County has two distinct ecological zones. The highlands run from north to south along the eastern border with Kapoeta County. The lowlands descend from the east towards the Kidepo River in the west. The highlands have two rainy seasons, March–September and October–February, making agriculture productive and often producing surplus crops for sale. The lowlands have a single long planting season from March to September, and often experience food shortages.

The county is divided into the payams of Kimatong, Lotukei, Komiri (Chukudum), Loudo, Lauro, Ngarich and Nagishot. The Buya people are about 20-30% of the population and the Didinga people are estimated 70-80% of the total. 2005 population estimates ranged between 128,385 and 155,847, with the lower number considered more plausible. The Buya occupy most of the lowlands of the Kimatong and Ngarich payams, in the northern half of the county, and the Didinga occupy the remaining southern payams of the county.

Eastern Equatoria State – Budi county in center

As of 2005 Budi County had one 800 metres (2,600 ft) airstrip, in Chukudum town. It had no paved roads, but was accessible from Kenya and Uganda, at least in the dry season. With the Didinga-Toposa peace agreement of February 2003 the Kapoeta-Lauro road was opened and it became possible for aid workers to reach the Lauro payam for the first time. New unpaved roads had given the economy a boost.

== Economy ==
Both the Buya and Didinga peoples are agro-pastoralists. The main crops are sorghum, maize, bulrush millet, potatoes, beans and sesame. There is potential, at least among the Didinga in the south, for the country to produce a surplus of crops. Wild foods are found in most areas, particularly in the fertile Kidepo valley, and include komok, lalop (desert date), nyyethit, tamarind, leit and palm fruits. Fish and game are not a significant source of food.

The Buya mainly measure their wealth in cattle, while the Didinga include cattle and granaries of threshed grain in their measure of wealth. With both groups, livestock plays a central role in people's lives, and are important during initiation and marriage rites where they are slaughtered for food or exchanged as formal gifts.

A December 2009 livelihood assessment conducted by International Relief and Development (IRD), the American Refugee Committee (ARC) and Mines Advisory Group (MAG), found that 5,000 internally displaced people and 2,528 returnees were living in the county. These people had few means for survival, and suffered chronic malnutrition. They had little knowledge of farming, including planting, weeding, water control, harvesting and sales of their crop. Failures of rainfall in 2009 had aggravated the problem.

== Security issues ==
The county came under the control of the Sudan People's Liberation Army (SPLA) in 1987. During the civil war, insecurity was caused by fighting between the SPLA and the rebel forces of Commander Peter Lorot, cattle rustling and attacks from militia groups. The fighting with Lorot's forces displaced about 16,800 people from Chukudum to nearby villages in the highlands. The "Chukudom Crisis" was resolved in August 2002 during a Peace Conference organized by the New Sudan Council of Churches. During the crisis, land mines were sown in the fields around Chukudum. Cattle raids by the Logiri of Torit and the Toposa of Kapoeta have been an ongoing cause of insecurity. The Lord's Resistance Army from Uganda, led by Joseph Kony, was among the armed groups that added to the general insecurity. A 2005 report noted tension between the Didinga and the SPLA, with villagers afraid of the soldiers and young women hiding in the hills to avoid rape.

Security is still poor. Before the January 2011 referendum, County Commissioner Charles Adtul said the people of the Lotukei Payam were not able to vote because they were afraid to cross the territories of other communities after an attack on 24 December 2010 in which five people were killed and three injured. In February 2011 two Catholic priests from the Torit diocese were ambushed at Ngarera on the road between Camp 15 and Chukudum. More than six men in military uniforms sprayed their vehicle with bullets before being scared away by an approaching minibus. A few days later, two policemen were killed, while 16 others escaped, in an ambush on the Loriyok-Chukudum road.
