= Jiye people =

The Jiye, also known as Jie, are an ethnic group living in the Kathangor Hills in Eastern Equatoria state, South Sudan. They speak a dialect of the Toposa language.

== Culture ==
The Jiye are seasonal pastoralists that mainly raise cattle. Women and children generally live in settled villages while men leave the village for the season to feed the cattle on pastures. In the villages, women engage in farming and cultivate crops like cow peas, maize, millet and tobacco. Cattle play a major role in Jiye culture and are incorporated into the religious system of the Jiye.
