= Narus, South Sudan =

Narus
- Town
- Location in South Sudan
- Coordinates: 4°30′4″N 34°9′42″E
- Country: South Sudan
- Region: Equatoria
- State: Eastern Equatoria
- County: Kapoeta East County
- Time zone: UTC+2 (CAT)
- Postal code: 1326

Narus is a community in the Eastern Equatoria State of South Sudan. It is the headquarters of Kapoeta East County.

== Location ==
Narus is 25 kilometres (16 mi) north of the Kenyan border on the road from Kapoeta to Lokichoggio in Kenya. Narus lies on the Narus River, which originates in the Didinga Hills to the west and discharges into the swampy area northeast of the community. The river floods during the rainy season, but ceases to flow at other times. During the rainy season, the river virtually cuts the town of Narus in two as the riverbed fills and sometimes floods. The small market area is also cut into two-halves, one on each side of the riverbed.

During the Second Sudanese Civil War (1983–2005) Narus remained reliably accessible for transport of supplies and personnel by road, being a one-hour drive from Northern Kenya. The trip still had hazards of rough roads and risk from bandits, cattle rustlers and factional fighters. In 2004 the first phase of an upgrade to the gravel road from Narus to the border town of Nadapal South Sudan was completed. There were plans to further upgrade the road through earthworks, grading, construction of drifts and installation of culverts.

== People ==
The local people around Narus belong to the Toposa community, a pastoral people. Cattle, goats and sheep play a central role in their society, and the Toposa have always been engaged in cattle raids and counter-raids with the Turkana people across the border in Kenya. During the civil war the Narus schools became refuges for orphans of Internally Displaced People (IDPs) from other communities. As of 2008 there were about 10,000 IDPs in Narus.

== Schools ==
St. Bakhita's Day and Boarding Girls' Primary School was established in Narus in 1994 with the goal of helping girls of Southern Sudan whose schooling had been disrupted by the civil war. The school is named after Josephine Bakhita, the first Sudanese to be declared a saint by the Roman Catholic Church. As of 2002 St. Bakhita's, run by the Sisters of Mary Mother of the Church of the Torit Catholic diocese, was the only girls' boarding school in southern Sudan, with 600 primary school students and 33 secondary students. Narus is also home to the Comboni Boys' School, which was opened in 1997 by the Torit diocese after the Sudan People's Liberation Movement had given assurances that they would not recruit the pupils.

== Civil war ==
During the civil war, boys were used as soldiers by both sides. Many were orphaned or were no longer accompanied by family members. Thousands had found their way to Ethiopia, where they fought for the Mengistu regime in late 1990 and early 1991. After this regime collapsed, the boys and other refugees returned to South Sudan, gathering at large camps at border towns such as Nasir, Pochalla, and Pakok. In its 1992 dry season offensive the government of Sudan attacked Pochalla. The boys moved southwest into Greater Kapoeta, through difficult country combining marshy and desert terrain, harassed by Toposa bandits. By 22 April 1992 there were 12,241 boys and 6,600 "teachers and dependents" in Narus. Kapoeta town was re-captured by the Government of Sudan in 1994 and many people were displaced to Narus. Refugees already in Narus moved south into Kenya, with about 12,000 boys reaching Lokichokio in late May 1992.

The Bishop of the Catholic Diocese of Torit left his official residence in Torit and moved to Narus during the civil war. Narus later suffered from bombing raids by the government. In one raid in December 1998 a government plane dropped 14 bombs over a period of three days, killing six people and wounding sixteen. In September 2000 a Sudanese government plane dropped a dozen bombs on a Catholic mission in Narus. A medical dispensary was destroyed and six people were injured including a nurse and children. In April 2001 the government dropped two bombs near St. Bakhita School, injuring one student and damaging buildings.
