= Kapoeta =

- Town
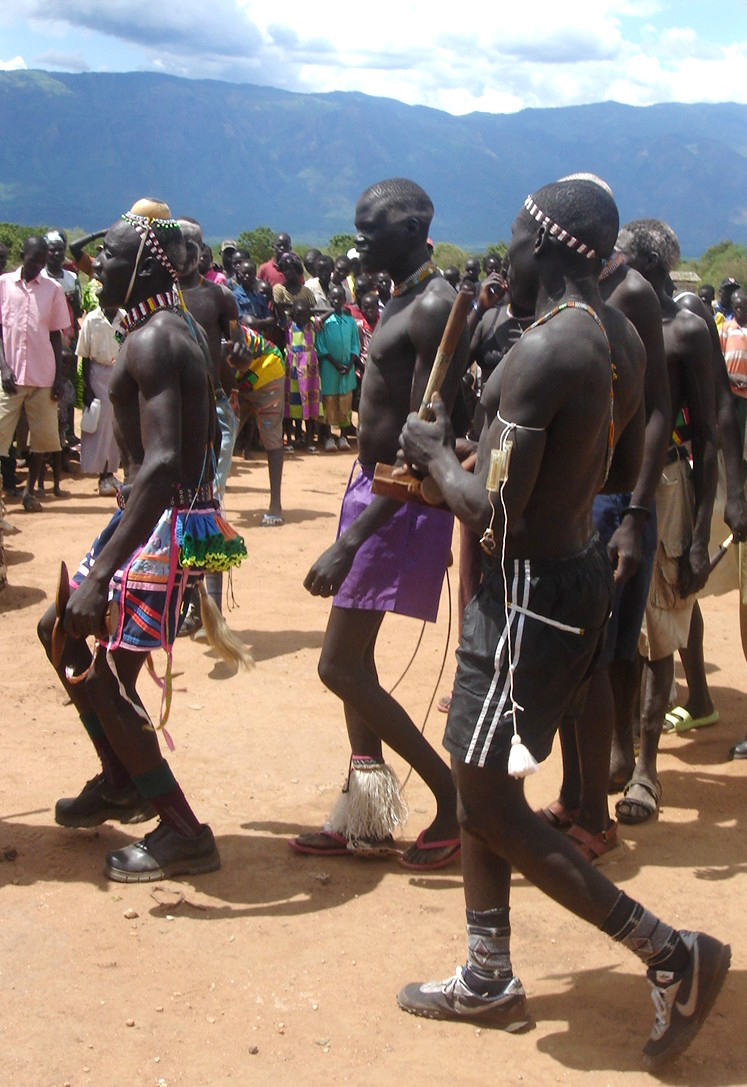
- Peace agreement dancers in Kapoeta

- Location in South Sudan
- Coordinates: 04°46′30″N 33°35′24″E
- Country: South Sudan
- Region: Equatoria
- State: Eastern Equatoria
- County: Kapoeta South County
- Town: 19 August 2013
- Elevation: 2,221 ft (677 m)

Population (2008 estimate)
  - Total: 7,000
- Time zone: UTC+2 (CAT)

Kapoeta is a town in South Sudan. It is located in Kapoeta South County, in Eastern Equatoria State, in southeastern South Sudan.

== Location ==
The town lies on the east bank of the Singaita River. The post at Kapoeta was established by Captain Knollys, who reached the river in January 1927. This location lies approximately 275 kilometres (171 mi), by road, east of Juba, the capital and largest city of South Sudan. The town sits at an elevation of 677 metres (2,221 ft) above sea level.

== History ==
Kapoeta was upgraded to town status administered by a town clerk on August 19, 2013.

== Transport ==
The main road from Lokichogio, Kenya to the capital city of Juba, South Sudan, runs through Kapoeta. The town is also served by Kapoeta Airport which, in 2011, was little more than a dirt strip.

== Population ==
As of August 2008, the population of Kapoeta was estimated at 7,000.

== Culture ==
Kapoeta town sits in a land dominated by the Toposa ethnic group. The Didinga also live in the area, but they are farmers and tend to inhabit the fertile, wetter hills, whereas the cattle-centric Toposa people dominate the plains.

== In popular culture ==
Kapoeta is a destination for the many South Sudanese who are chronicled in the nonfiction book Lost Boy, Lost Girl: Escaping Civil War in Sudan.

== Points of interest ==
The following points of interest are found in or near Kapoeta:

- The offices of Kapoeta Town Council
- The headquarters of Kapoeta South County
- Kapoeta Airport – a civilian airport to the north of town
- Kapoeta Power Station – A 0.9MW high-speed diesel plant, commissioned in 2011
- The Narus River – Seasonal River, prone to flooding

== See also ==
- Kapoeta Airport
- Eastern Equatoria
- Equatoria
