= Uganda Conservation Foundation =

Ugandan charity and NGO

Uganda Conservation Foundation (UCF)
- Headquarters: United Kingdom (UK)
- Fields: Wildlife Conservation
- Website: https://ugandacf.org/

Uganda Conservation Foundation (UCF) is a UK-registered charity and not-for-profit organisation in Uganda that collaborates with Uganda Wildlife Authority (UWA) and other partners, both local and international to protect Uganda's national parks, protected areas, and conservancies. Uganda Wildlife Authority, a semi-autonomous government agency works with independent organisations to support their mandate of conserving, managing, and regulating Uganda's wildlife. UCF was founded in 2001 by Michael Keigwin MBE who initiated the Elephants, Crops and People project in Queen Elizabeth National Park. UCF has continued to work closely with UWA in Murchison Falls National Park, Kidepo Valley National Park, Ziwa Rhino Sanctuary and Queen Elizabeth National Park.

== Recovery of Murchison Falls Programme ==
In 2012, UCF supported UWA in their bid to put a stop to increasingly common incident of poaching. Through this project they developed the necessary infrastructure to combat poaching by training and equipping rangers, building a state-of-the-art communications system, and providing vehicles.

They also established and managed an educational program within the communities on the fringes of the park. Through this program, 80 young people have been able to undergo vocational training.

Of particular note is the recently completed Law Enforcement and Operations Center in Murchison Falls National Park which features an advanced anti-poaching mechanisms, from satellite-linked surveillance screens to temporary prison cells and a police station. One hundred youths from the park-adjacent communities were employed by the contractor and many of them are now training to join UWA as rangers.

Since its inception, the Recovery of Murchison Falls project has constructed 12 key Ranger posts in strategic locations around the park and implemented a new surveillance system. This has been fundamental in fighting poaching and helping animal populations increase. Rothschild's giraffe numbers have increased from 400 to 2000 whilst African bush elephant numbers have increased to around 3000.

UCF has also supported capacity development for wildlife veterinarians working with UWA, contributing to the training and professional advancement of veterinary personnel in Uganda’s protected areas. Some of these veterinarians have gone on to play key roles in national conservation efforts, including wildlife health management and species translocation initiatives.

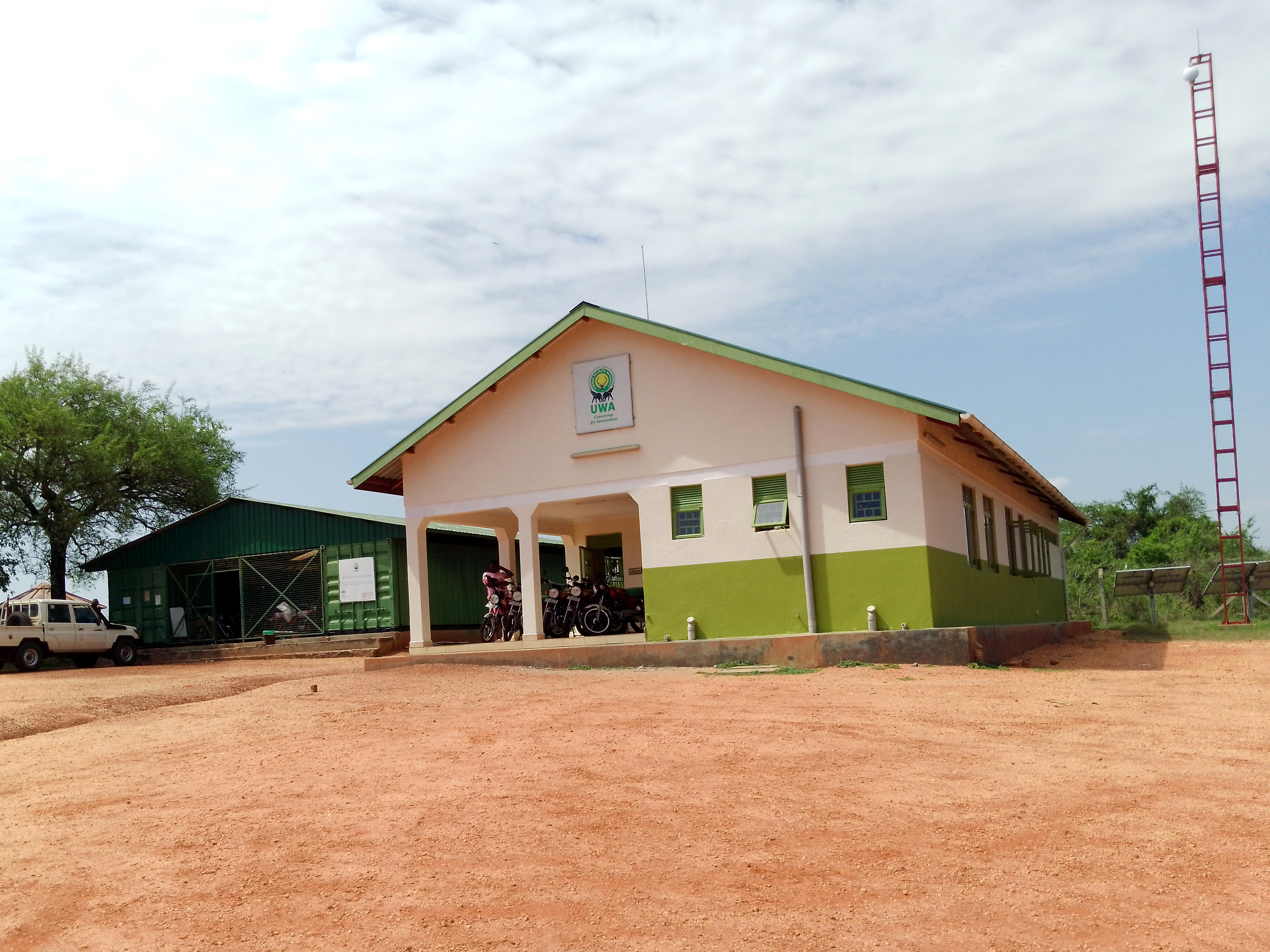
The Joint Law Enforcement and Operations Center

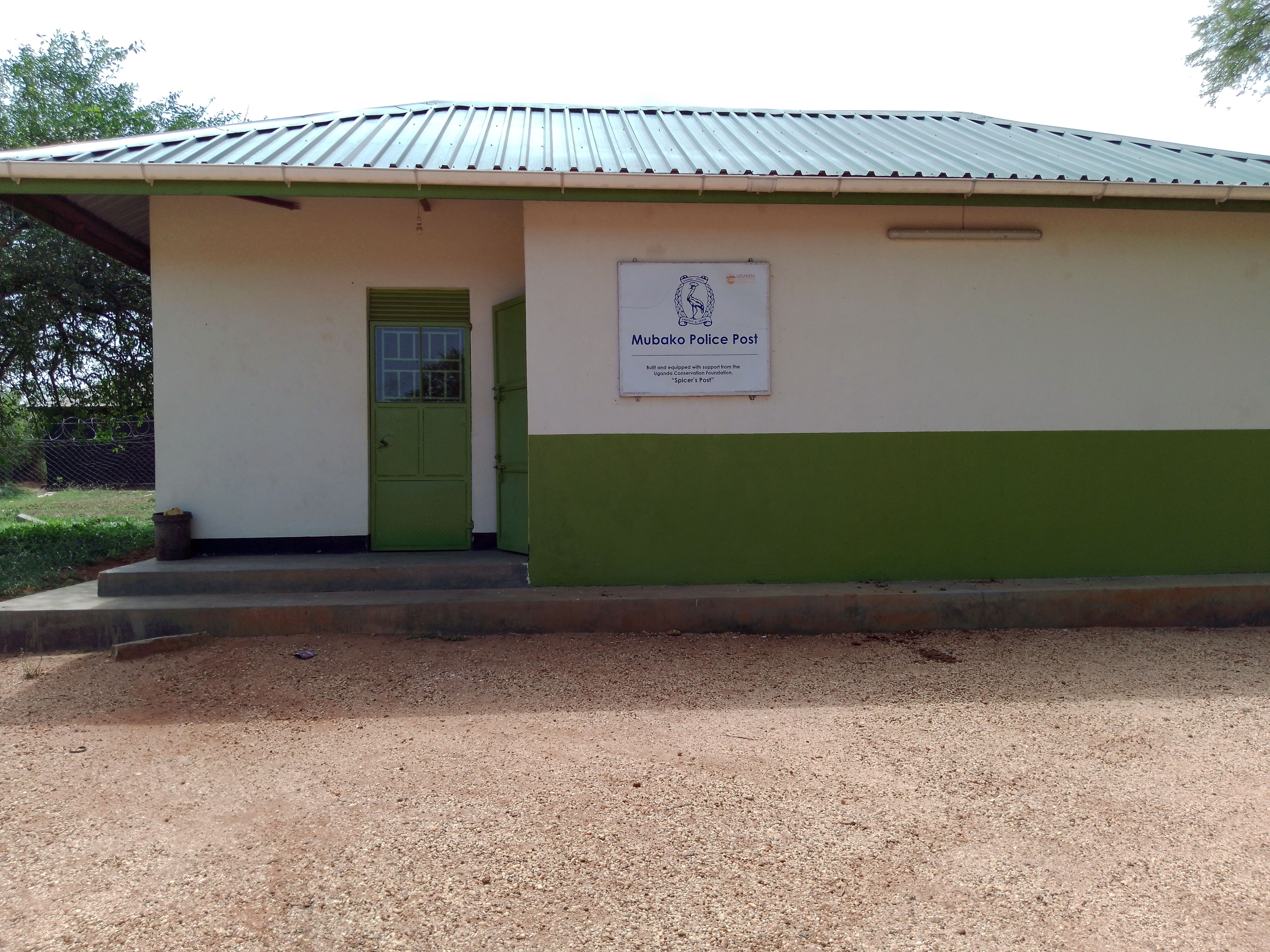
The Police Post at the Joint Law Enforcement and Operations Center

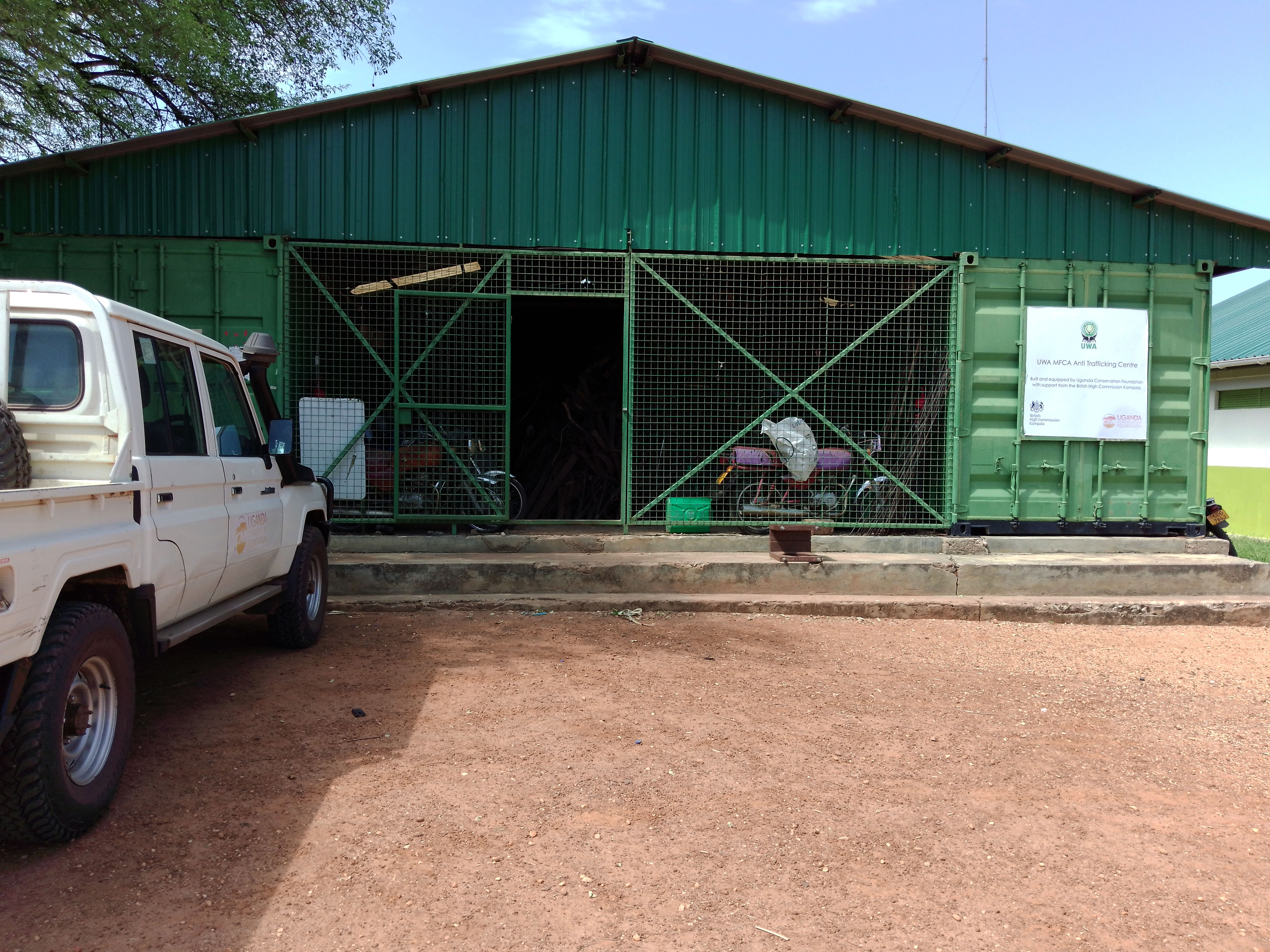
The Anti Trafficking Center

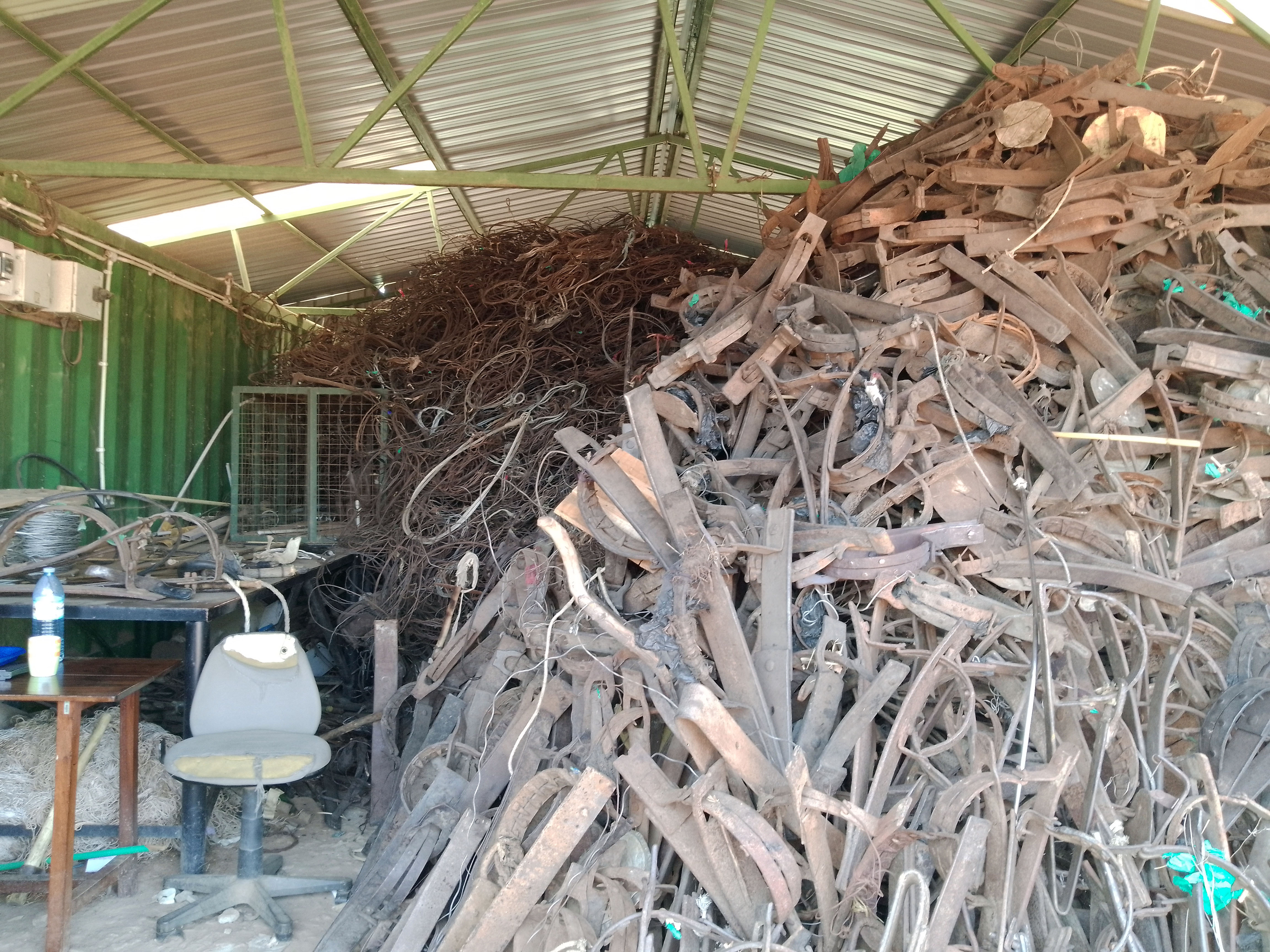
Confiscated snares and traps inside the Anti Trafficking Center

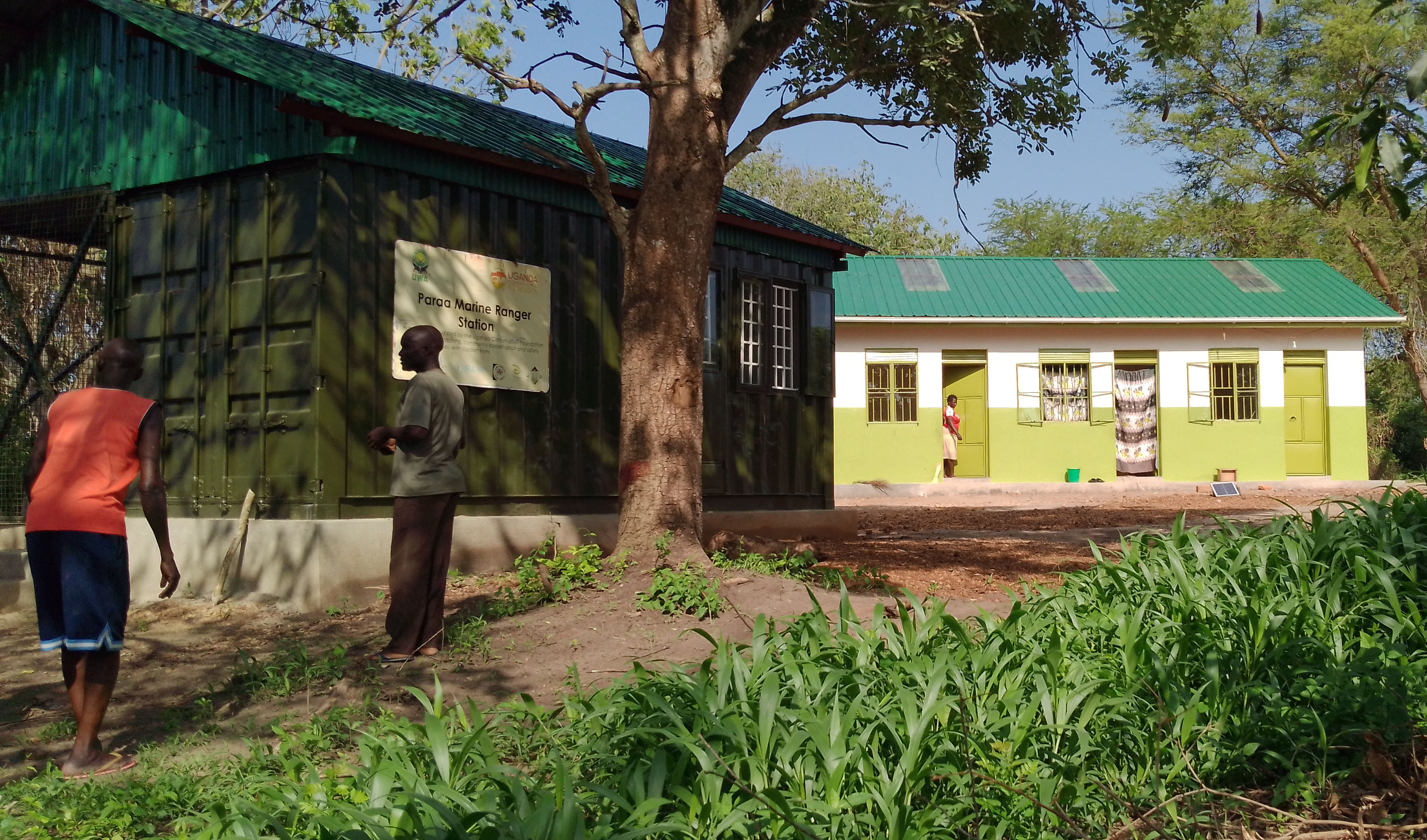
Marine Ranger Station at Buligi in Murchison Falls National Park

== COVID-19 response ==
The COVID-19 pandemic brought tourism to a halt, and the 95% drop in funding had devastating effects on the national park's operations.The loss of income left the parks struggling to cover the day-to-day costs of protecting and rescuing wildlife .

The Wildlife Ranger Challenge was established in 2020 to support rangers across Africa who had been negatively impacted by COVID-19. The Uganda arm of the event, which consisted of ranger teams running a half marathon with 22 kg on their back, took place in Murchison Falls National Park in both 2020 & 2021 and was managed by UCF. UCF has continued to host the hub event in Murchison Falls for 2022 and 2023 with increasing national park and supporter team participation, and this has prompted other organisations to host similar hub events in Kenya, Zambia and South Africa.

In addition to the Wildlife Ranger Challenge, UCF supported UWA's operations in Murchison Falls and Queen Elizabeth National Parks with food rations for rangers, fuel for patrols, face masks and sanitizer, vehicle and boat maintenance during the low months.

== High-resolution aerial camera survey in Queen Elizabeth National Park ==
A paper published in February 2023 with the results of the 2018 Queen Elizabeth National Park aerial survey undertaken by UCF and UWA puts the African bush elephant population in the park at an estimated 4,711, which is 62% higher than the previous observer-based estimate of 2,900 in the 2014 Great Elephant Census, and the highest since counts began in the 1960s.

UWA needed precise wildlife population estimates to guide conservation actions, but population estimates derived from aerial observers showed great variability and therefore trends were hard to discern. This survey replaced Rear Seat Observers RSOs with Oblique Camera Count imaging systems orientated at 40 degrees and captured 43,000 images for enumeration of 13 species. The photos were interpreted by a team of four Ugandan interpreters, originally trained in similar exercises in Uganda and Kenya.

The highest densities of elephant distribution were in the thicket areas along Kazinga Channel, and there was a very low carcass ratio of only 1.4%, compared to 3.1% in the Great Elephant Census 2014 count. Buffalo are widely distributed throughout the national park, with the largest concentrations in open grasslands and around waterholes in Ishasha, Kyambura and Kasenyi Plains.

The survey was led by Dr Richard Lamprey and was conducted with funding from UWA and some international conservation agencies including Save the Elephants, International Elephant Foundation, Global Conservation and Vulcan Inc.

== "Snare Mountain" ==
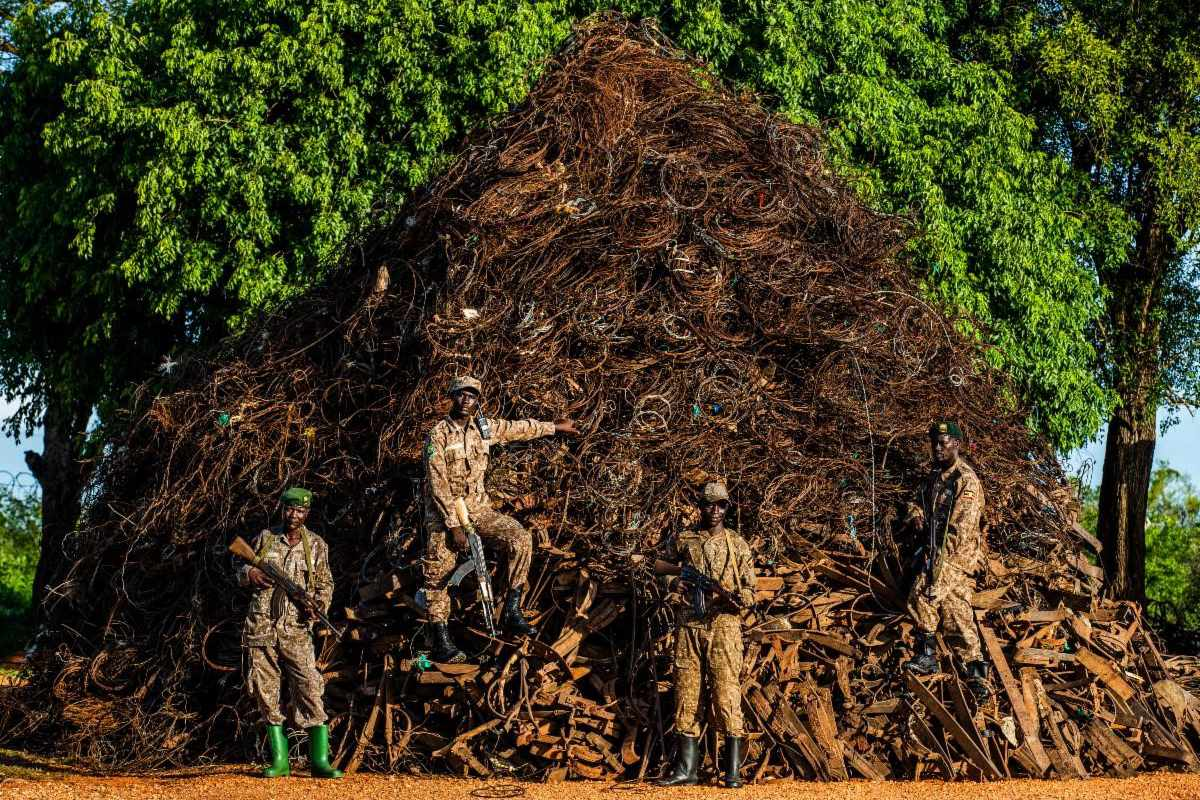
Wildlife rangers standing in front of the pile of snares, at Murchison Falls National Park

Snare Mountain was a conservation initiative in Murchison Falls National Park aimed at addressing poaching issues. Organised by Global Conservation in collaboration with the Uganda Conservation Foundation (UCF), the project featured the work of photographer Paul Hilton. It involved the collection and display of wire snares and bear traps gathered by park rangers over a 12-month period. The initiative aimed to raise awareness about poaching by visually showcasing the tools used by poachers. Images from the project were widely disseminated, appearing in numerous news outlets globally.

== Use of technological innovation in anti-poaching ==
In 2025, Uganda Conservation Foundation supported the deployment of GPS-tagged African white-backed vultures as part of an innovative anti-poaching surveillance initiative in Murchison Falls National Park. These vultures, which naturally circle over carcasses, act as biological sensors for detecting potential poaching events. Data from the tagged vultures—alongside signals from satellite collars fitted on animals such as elephants and lions—is transmitted in real time to EarthRanger, a conservation area management platform used by UWA and UCF, and monitored at the Joint Operations Command Centre Artificial intelligence tools built into the system analyze movement patterns and behavioral anomalies to flag potential threats. This combination of AI, real-time data, and centralized monitoring has strengthened park surveillance, enhanced rapid response capabilities, and contributed to ongoing efforts to reduce poaching and protect wildlife populations in the park.
