= List of protected areas of Uganda =

Name	Type	IUCN	Area km2	Area sq mi	Region	Year Gazetted
Bwindi Impenetrable	National Park	II	331	128	Western	1991
Kibale forest park	National Park	II	370	100	Western	2006
Kidepo Valley	National Park	II	1,430	552.1	Northern	1958
Lake Mburo	National Park	II	370	100	Western	2006
Mgahinga Gorilla	National Park	II	38	14.7	Western	1991
Mount Elgon	National Park	II	1,110	428.6	Eastern	1992
Murchison Falls	National Park	II	3,877	1,496.9	Northern & Western	1952
Queen Elizabeth	National Park	II	2,056	793.8	Western	1952
Rwenzori Mountains	National Park	II	995	384.2	Western	1991
Semliki	National Park	II	220	84.9	Western	1993
Ajai	Wildlife Reserve	III	148	57.1	Northern	1965
Bokora Corridor	Wildlife Reserve	III	1,816	701.2	Northern	1964
Kabwoya	Wildlife Reserve	III	87	33.6	Western	1980
Katonga	Wildlife Reserve	III	210	81.1	Western	1998
Kigezi	Wildlife Reserve	III	265	102.3	Western	1952
Matheniko	Wildlife Reserve	III	1,757	678.4	Northern	1964
Pian Upe	Wildlife Reserve	III	2,304	889.6	Northern	1958
Semliki Wildlife Reserve	Wildlife Reserve	III	542	209.3	Western	1926
Karenga	Community Wildlife Management Area	VI	956	369.1	Northern	2002
Entebbe	Wildlife Sanctuary	VI	51	19.8	Central	1951
Ngamba Island	Wildlife Sanctuary		40 hectares	100 acres	Central	1998
Otze Forest	Wildlife Sanctuary	VI			Northern	1995
Ziwa Rhino	Wildlife Sanctuary		70	27	Central	2005
Lake Opeta	Ramsar Site					
Lake Bisina	Ramsar Site					
Lutembe Bay	Ramsar Site					
Mabamba Bay	Ramsar Site					
Murchison Falls	Ramsar Site					

== See also ==
- Conservation in Uganda
- Central Forest Reserves of Uganda
- List of national parks in Africa
