= Wabigalo–Nakasongola–Sasira Road =

Road in Uganda

Coordinates: 01°18′54″N 32°26′26″E

Route information
- Length: 13 mi (21 km)
- History: Designated in 2010; Upgrading completed in 2011

Major junctions
- North end: Nakasongola Air Force Base
- Nakasongola, Wabigalo
- South end: Sasira

Location
- Country: Uganda

Highway system
- Roads in Uganda

The Wabigalo–Nakasongola–Sasira Road is a road in the Central Region of Uganda, connecting the town of Nakasongola with the towns of Wabigalo and Sasira on the Kampala–Gulu Highway. An extension from Nakasongola links to Nakasongola Air Force Base.

== Location ==
The road starts at Wabigalo on the Kampala–Gulu Highway, approximately 56 kilometres (35 mi), south of the Kafu River bridge. From Wabigalo, the road extends eastwards to the Headquarters of Nakasongola District, a distance of approximately 5 kilometres (3 mi). From there, the road runs in a general south to north direction to the Nakasongola Airport, the location of the UPDF Nakasongola Air Force Base, a distance of about 12 kilometres (7 mi). Also, from Wabigalo, the construction extends north-westwards along the Gulu Highway for about 1.5 kilometres (1 mi), to Sasira. The entire road measures about 21 kilometres (13 mi).

== Overview ==
This road connects the town of Nakasongola, where the headquarters of Nakasongola District are located, to the Gulu Highway, which links the capital Kampala, to Gulu, the largest city in the Northern Region of Uganda. It also links downtown Nakasongola to Nakasongola Air Force Base and Nakasongola Military Airport.

== Upgrading to tarmac ==
Prior to 2010, this road was gravel-surface in poor condition, with gullies and pot-holes. The upgrading of the road involved the conversion of the then existing gravel surface to tarmac and the building of bridges and drainage channels. Energo Project, a Serbian construction company carried out the upgrade, between 2010 and 2011, at a cost of USh13.8 billion (at that time US$6 million), funded by the Government of Uganda.

== See also ==
- Nakasongola District
- Economy of Uganda
- List of cities and towns in Uganda
- List of roads in Uganda
