= Conservation in Uganda =

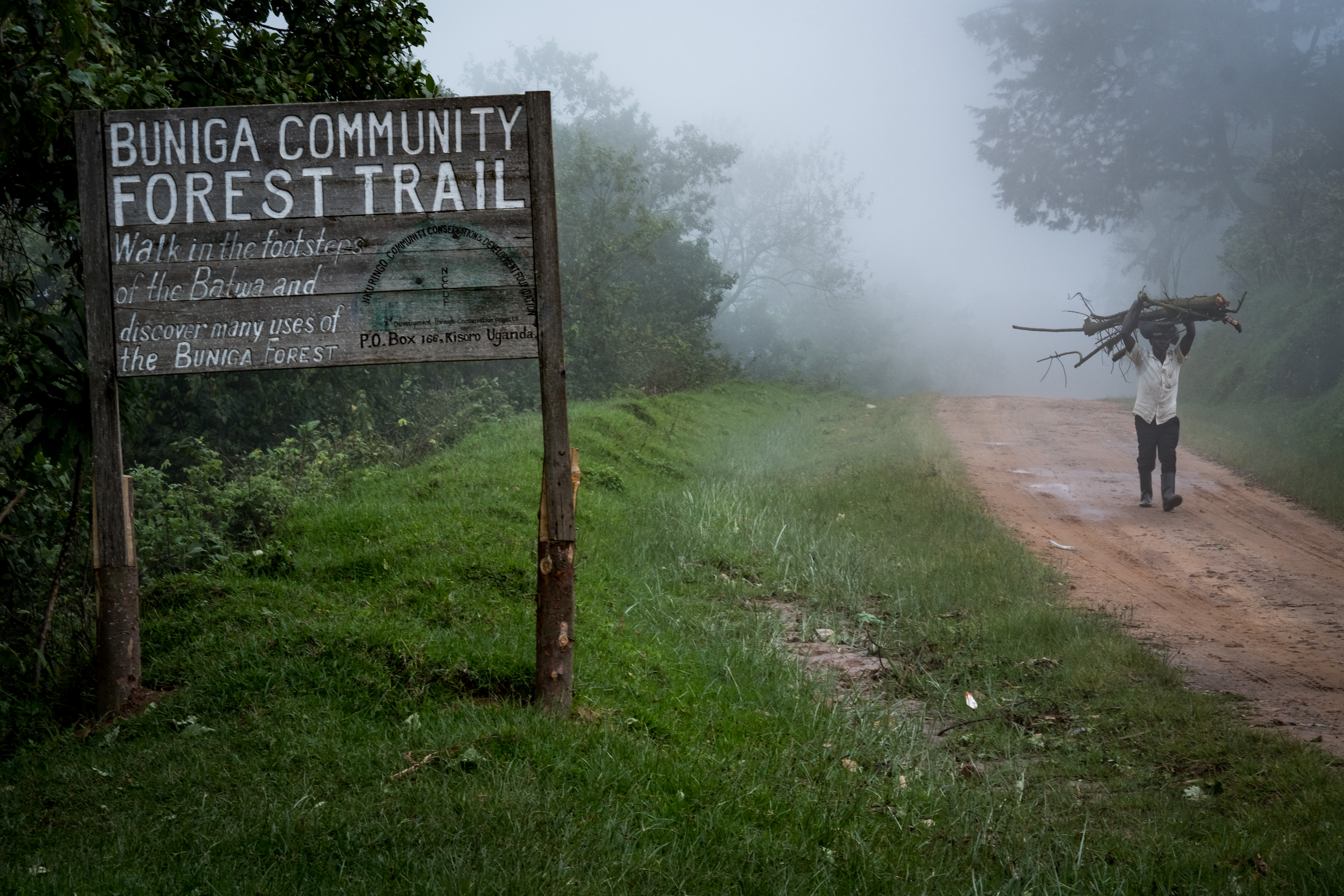
Signage for a cultural tourism walk, near the International Gorilla Conservation Programme

Conservation in Uganda is the protection and sustainable use of the country's rich natural resources. It became a significant movement during the British colonial period in the early 20th century and continues to play a major role in Uganda's political economy, as it underpins the tourism industry which accounts for 23.5% of the country's exports.

Uganda's 60 conservation protected areas harbor populations of numerous critically endangered species.

== History of conservation ==
=== British Protectorate (1894–1962) ===
Active concerted management of wildlife in the Uganda Protectorate began in 1923 with the formation of the Elephant Control Department. The object of this organization was to reduce the damage to peasant agriculture by limiting the size and range of elephant populations. Culling programs killed an average of 1,000 elephants per year.

== National organizations ==
=== Pro-Biodiversity Conservationists in Uganda ===
Pro-Biodiversity Conservationists in Uganda (PROBICOU) (founded in 1999 and registered in November 2000) is a Uganda based not for profit organization which aims at environmental preservation and protection, biodiversity conservation and implementation of sustainable development principles in the country. PROBICOU was incorporated on 14 December 2007, under the Companies Act, Laws of Uganda as a Public Limited Company without Share Capital.

== International agencies ==
=== Wildlife Conservation Society ===
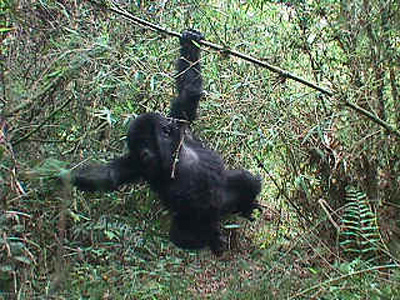
An endangered mountain gorilla

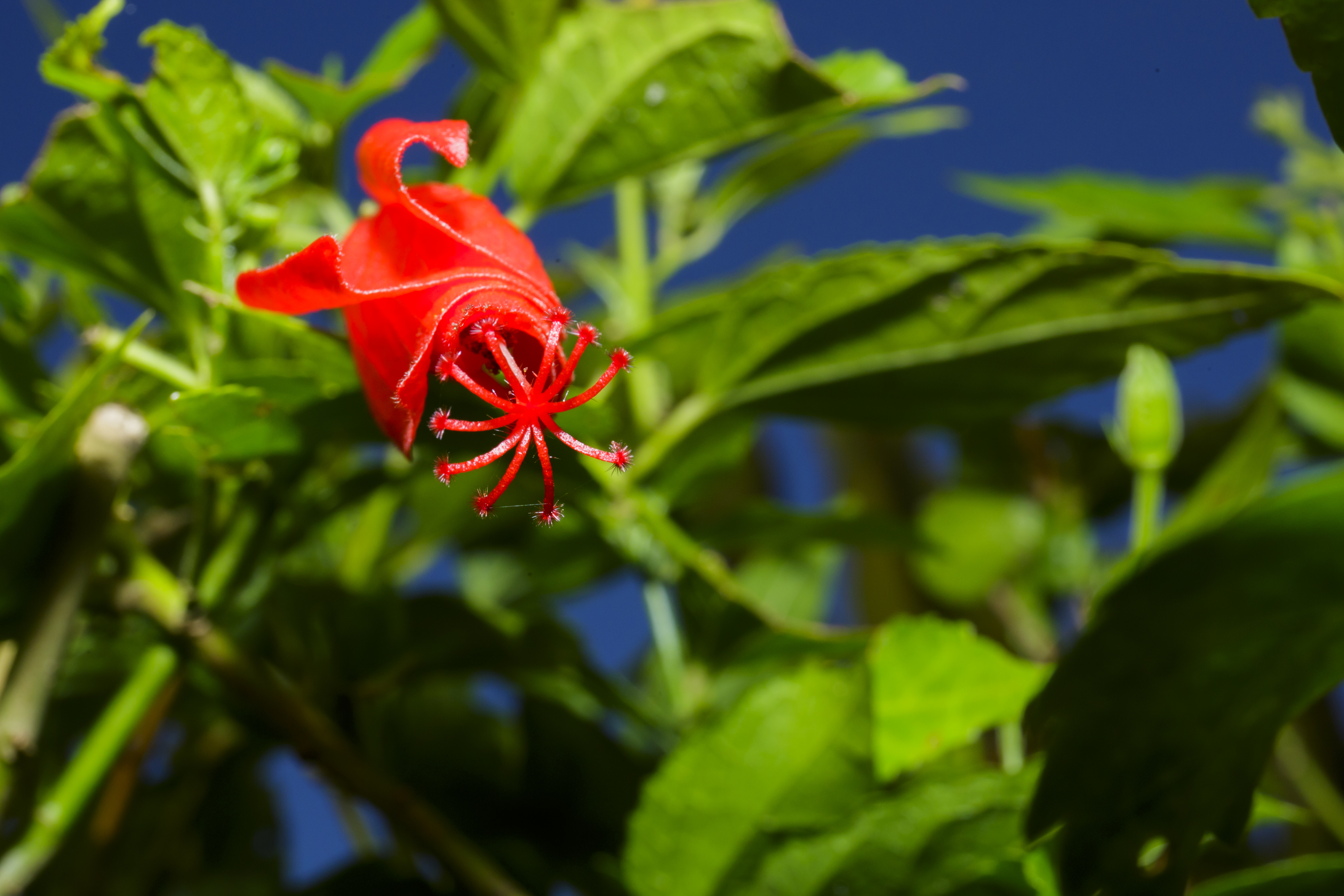
Flower specie in Uganda

In 2015, the published results of the "Great Elephant Census", an aerial survey undertaken by the WCS along with the UWA, indicated that the number of African bush elephants has increased by almost 600 percent from a low of 700 to 800 individuals in the 1980s up to 5,000 individuals. The survey was conducted in Queen Elizabeth National Park (2,913 elephants), Murchison Falls National Park (1,330 elephants), and Kidepo Valley National Park (656 elephants). The survey did not include protected areas with elephant populations like Kibale National Park, Rwenzori Mountains National Park, Semliki National Park, and the Toro-Semliki Wildlife Reserve as well as closed canopy areas like the Maramagambo forest within Queen Elizabeth National Park and the Kaniyo Pabidi forest within Murchison Falls National Park.

== Wildlife ==
Uganda is home to a vast number of species, including a population of mountain gorillas in the Bwindi Impenetrable National Park, gorillas and golden monkeys in the Mgahinga Gorilla National Park, and hippos in the Murchison Falls National Park.

== See also ==
- List of Protected Areas in Uganda
- National Cultural Sites of Uganda
