= 2016 census =

2016 census may refer to:

- 2016 Alberta municipal censuses
- 2016 Australian census
- 2016 Canadian Census
- Great Elephant Census
