= Hilf =

Hilf is a surname. Notable people with the surname include:

- Arno Hilf (1858–1909), German violin virtuoso
- Bill Hilf, American businessman
- Rudolf Hilf (1923–2011), German historian

== See also ==
- Help (disambiguation)
- Hill (surname)
