= The Wild and the Brave =

1974 film

- Directed by: Eugene S. Jones
- Produced by: Eugene S. Jones; Natalie R. Jones
- Starring: Ian Ross and wife, Paul Ssali Naluma, wife and family, Kidepo rangers
- Cinematography: Tony Mander
- Edited by: Stephen Milne
- Distributed by: Tomorrow Entertainment
- Release date: May 15, 1974
- Running time: 102 minutes
- Country: United States
- Language: English

The Wild and the Brave, also known as Two Men of Karamoja, is a 1974 American documentary film directed by Eugene S. Jones. The film portrays the relationship between Iain Ross, the outgoing British Chief Warden of Kidepo Valley National Park, and his Ugandan replacement Paul Ssali. It portrays the racial and cultural tensions and amity of the postcolonial handover from 1970 to 1972.

It was nominated for an Academy Award for Best Documentary Feature.
