= Karenga Community Wildlife Management Area =

Ugandan wildlife management area

- Location within Uganda
- Location: Karenga, Kaabong, Karamoja, Uganda
- Coordinates: 3°29′46″N 33°43′24″E
- Area: 956 km^{2} (369 sq mi)
- Established: 2002

The Karenga Community Wildlife Management Area (KCWMA) is a community managed conservation area located in north-eastern Uganda, within Karenga District. The area was gazetted in 2002 and performs part of the boarder ecological landscape associated with Kidepo Valley National Park. It is managed to serve wildlife while supporting local community livelihoods.

== Geography ==
Karenga community Wildlife Management Area covers approximately 956 square Kilometers ( 369 sq mi). It lies within the semi-arid region of the East Sudano-Sahelian, ecological zone, characterized by open plains, seasonal rivers and low rocky hills. The area forms an important wildlife dispersal zone connected to Kidepo Valley National Park.

== Habitats ==
The dominant habitat in the management area is Acacia-Commiphora bushland and thicket, typical of the East Sudanian Biome. This vegetation type supports a range of savanna adapted wildlife species and is interspersed with seasonal grasslands and dry riverbeds that become important grazing and water sources during the wet season.

== Wildlife ==
The wildlife management area supports a variety of mammal, bird and reptile species typical of northeastern Uganda. Mammals recorded include African elephant, giraffe, leopard, cheetah, giant forest frog, warthog, buffalo, Uganda kob, waterbuck, topi, bushbuck and other antelope species.

Primates species present include vervet monkeys and blue monkeys. the area serves as an important seasonal range and movement corridor for wildlife associated with Kidepo Valley National Park.

=== Birdlife ===
Karenga Community Wildlife Management Area supports a diverse avifauna characteristic of the East Sudanian Biome. A wide range of savanna and dryland bird species has been recorded, contributing to the region's importance for bird conservation in northeastern Uganda.

== Management and conservation ==
The area is managed under Uganda's community wildlife management framework, with local communities playing a central role in conservation and resource governance. Management objectives include wildlife protection, sustainable use of natural resources and reduction of human wildlife conflict.

Like many conservation areas in the region, Karenga Community Wildlife Management Area has faced challenges such as poaching, charcoal production and limited infrastructure. Government agencies and conservation partners have implemented measures including community engagement, enforcement of regulations and awareness programs to address these pressures.

== See also ==
- Kidepo Valley National Park
- Karenga District
