= Ketebo people =

Ethnic group in South Sudan

The Ketebo people are an ethnic group in South Sudan. The Ketebo are inhabitants of Bira which is the land of the Ketebo. Bira, which was placed by the British colonial in 1914 under Ugandan Protectorate until 1925, was transferred back to Sudan's administration in 1926. The Ketebo are sometimes referred to by the Didinga as "Loceha/Loceka". The Ketebo live in Bira, which is one of the Payams of Kidepo Valley County, Torit, Eastern Equatoria State of South Sudan. They are one of the smallest and least known tribes in South Sudan. The Ketebo in Uganda are called Mening, which is also one of the smallest tribes in Uganda. The population of this ethnic group is over 45,000. Bira is the land of the Ketebo, which includes:Lojilingare, Arata, Nakoringole, Natedo, Nahitahapel (Ihapelmoru), Naurkori, Lochorangichokio, Lokudul, Napeyase, Ogeng, Tongoborei, Kalabe (Apoka), Irobi, Narus, Koryang, Tomoodo, Koryang, Losigiria, Irobi just to mention a few. The Ketebo people are also found in Lotukei in Budi County.

The Ketebo clans include the following: Akafuo, Amening (Ikuruha or Black Crow), Ametere, Fatuol, Ibilei, Icarai, Igago, Ikai (Lightning), Ikorom, Ingebe, Kitimo, Kurumo, Lohutok (white chest crow), Lokuti, Lonyili, Lomiru, Melong, Moliro (squirrel), Ongeja and Omiro.

== Language ==
The Ketebo predominantly speak Oketeboi, although Lokathan is also spoken to a lesser extent.

== History ==
=== The Origin and Migration of the Ketebo People ===
Based on the history of the Ketebo which has not been anthropologically documented. The Ketebo sometimes in most of the writings are referred to as "Bira or Lokathan." The Ketebo are believed to have originated in the Ethiopian hills and moved towards Lake Rudolf (currently Lake Turkana) in the 13th century. They are categorized under the groups of the Nilo Hamites (Referred to by modern historians as Eastern Nilotes) together with the Massai of Kenya, whom they share a lot of words. The Ketebo arrived and settled in the Lotukei mountains in Eastern Equatoria in the 14th and 15th centuries

=== Settlement in Sudan ===
During the influx of other tribes in the 1650s, such as the Bari, Lotuho and Didinga from Ethiopia using Lotukei as a people's migratory corridor, the Ketebo, who are mountainous people, decided to move further southwards to the Bira Mountain and settled in Madiel or Madial/Loofus, Lonyili, Irobi, Akorou, Tookiliori, Ibakany, Lorema, Ichome, Nafitiro, Moruhirion, Idufa, and later, due to hunting and farming, some of the Ketebo opted for the lowland in Kalabe, Lotome, Taakifie, Loojilingare, Toomodo, Namosingo, Lobilatome, Ofi, Okosio, Kamulach, Naitahapel). It is worth noting that Bira is the land of the Ketebo but not a tribe as referred to by "Driberg 1935 and A. N. Tucker 1935, pg. 887, survey of language groups in Southern Sudan".

In the 19th century during the Mahdia Revolution of 1881 – 1898, which was referred to by the Ketebo as "Manatong", the Ketebo were fought by the agents of the Mahdia who were coming via Kitgum looking for slaves in the Bira mountains. The Ketebo used spears (nafere) and shields (nabuhu) to fight the Manatong until they sang a song ..."Odeto nafere moruhirion, odeto nafere fadfad." The Ketebo people were also being fought by the Toposa and Turkana (Fungech) raiders. Nevertheless, the Ketebo stood firm against slavery and the last war to stop slavery was fought on top of Akorou mountain (the current Nakoringole), where the Acholi King Okwir, who was one of the agents of the Mahdia, was killed along with his many fighters, which brought an end to the war. These events are referenced in the 21st century song (Kori Koringole, Ikoringole) sung by an Acholi musician from Kitgum called Ogwang Clipper. This war coupled with the handing over Madial to Uganda in 1914, made some of the Ketebo people move further to Uganda in Karenga District (Lokori sub-district) and also back to Lotukei, Betalado, Lorema, Lotomei etc. in the current Chukudum County. Currently, the Ketebo are found in Bira, Lotukei and Lokori and Karenga in Uganda and they are referred to as Mening tribe.

Bira, which was commonly referred to as Madial (see enclosed Madial Map, 30 June 1930) during the British colonial, was placed under Uganda Protectorate in 1914, as stated by Roberts O. Collins in his writings on Sudan-Uganda boundary rectification and the Sudanese occupation of Madial, 1914. It is worth mentioning that even during the protectorate of Madial, the inhabitants (Ketebo) were protected by Sudan Army Forces (SAF). In 1926 the Madiel enclave was returned to the Sudan as the proclamation read:

NOW I, MAJOR-GENERAL HUBBERT JERVOISE HUDDLESTON, C.B., C.M.G., D.S.O., M.C., Acting Governor General of the Sudan, hereby Proclaim and Order that from and after the 17th day of September, 1926, the said territory and its inhabitants shall be subjected to the Sudan Government as part of Mangalla Province of the Sudan and that all laws, ordinaries and regulations of the Sudan government in force in the said Province shall have full force and effect herein.

=== The Bira/Madial Map ===
The Ketebo map boundary with Uganda follows a straight line from the tip of Mt. Lonyili-Narengadoket-River Lorife-Kalabe (renamed by Ugandan to Apoka)- Lomej-Bottom of Mt. Losolia (Zulia)-Mt. Mogila. Precisely the straight line runs from Mt. Lonyili to Mt. Mogila.

=== Marriage (Nakiyemi/Kiyemi) ===
The Ketebo practiced polygamy, and they marry using cattle. Historically the Ketebo have made use of arranged marriage, although since the late 20th century, young men and women over the age of 18 are allowed to choose who they want to marry. When a girl is caught with a boy having sex, the boy's parent is made to pay something called Ingasa which is 6 goats and if the boy again is caught with the same girl, it is multiplied by 2 which is 12 goats and continuously. If the girl becomes pregnant, the boy pays a fine of 3 cows and six goats. If you want to initiate the marriage, there is something called Naloto or official booking of the girl where the boys’ family brings a female goat (nakine) and a kid or 2 goats, a spear (nafere), hoe (lokebu), and tobacco (lotaba). In summary, Ketebo marriages range from 25 cows and 86 goats mixed with sheep.

In Uganda, the Ketebo or Mening lived in the area of what is now Kidepo Valley National Park since 1800, but it was gazetted as a game reserve by the British colonial government in 1958. The purpose was both to protect the animals from hunting and to prevent further clearing of bush for tsetse fly-control. After the eviction of the resident people and the resultant famine, the Ketebo people were forcibly relocated to other areas within Bira such as Napotpot, Kalo Kudo, Namosingo, Loriwo and Naurkori in South Sudan. This is cited in contemporary park management as an example of the unacceptable consequences of not taking community needs into account when designating reserves.

== Economic activities ==
The Ketebo people were previously pastoralist in nature but due to a change in climate and external influence from the neighbouring communities they are now practicing cultivation systems, with sorghum, maize and sesame as the main crops during the growing season (April to August).

Bira is isolated and inaccessible. The nearest health centers are in Ikotos, 117 kilometres (73 mi) away, and Karenga in Uganda 65 kilometres (40 mi) away.
