= Vulcan FlipStart =

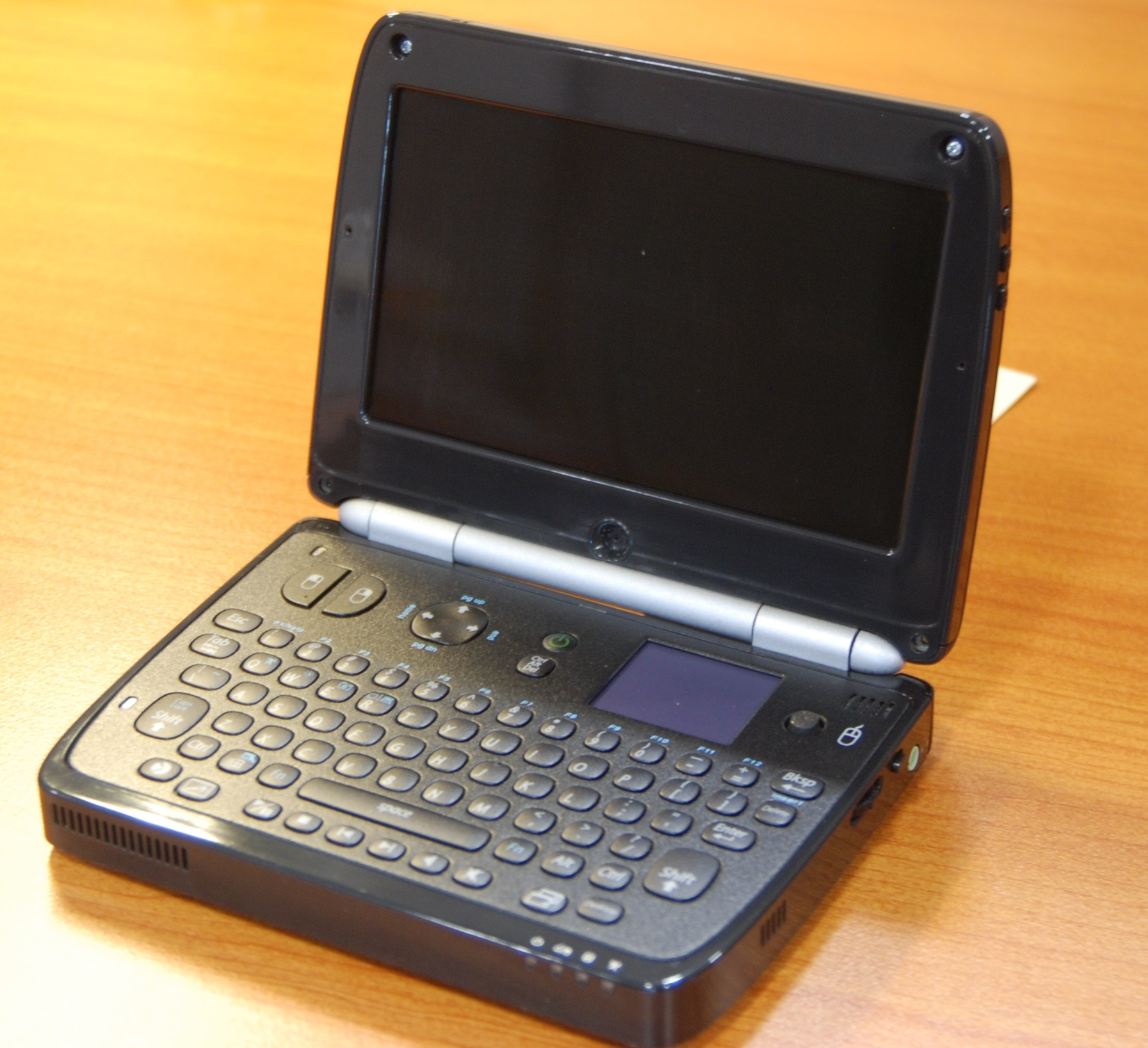
- FlipStart on display at the Living Computer Museum
- Also known as: MiniPC
- Developer: Vulcan Inc.
- Manufacturer: FlipStart Labs
- Type: UMPC
- Generation: First
- Released: March 27, 2007
- Lifespan: 1 year
- Introductory price: $1999
- Discontinued: 2008
- Operating system: Windows XP and Vista
- CPU: Pentium M ULV
- Memory: 512Mb
- Storage: portable
- Display: 16:9, WSVGA
- Sound: Speaker, stereo microphone
- Input: jog dial, TouchStick, keypad, touchpad
- Camera: VGA
- Connectivity: WiFi, Bluetooth, Ethernet
- Power: AC Power
- Dimensions: 4.5 x 5.9 x 1.6 inches
- Weight: 1.5 lbs.

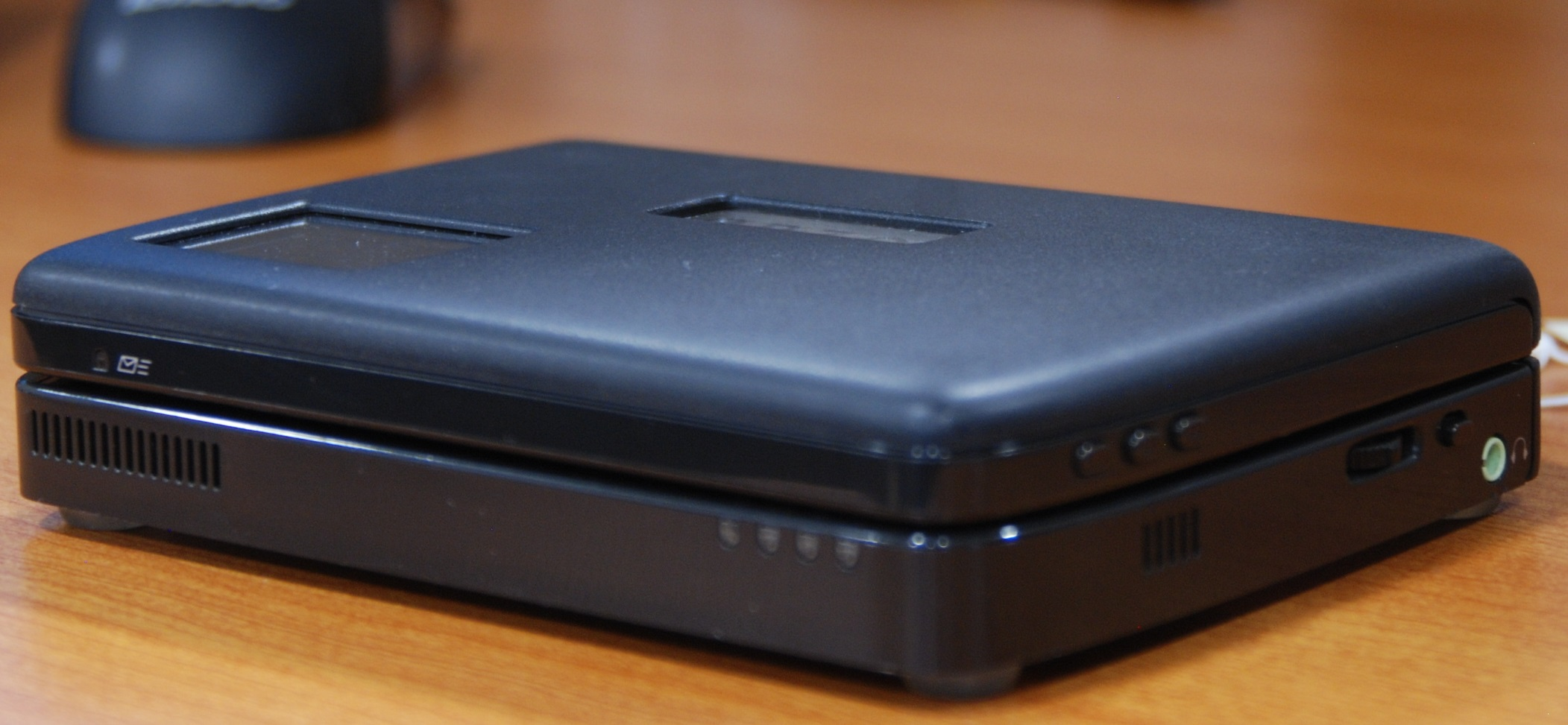
Closed Vulcan Flip Start. On Display at the Living Computer Museum in Seattle, Washington.

The Vulcan FlipStart was a super compact PC, weighing 1.5 pounds (with standard high capacity battery) and the size of a paperback novel (4.5 by 5.9 by 1.6 inches with high capacity battery). FlipStart was the release name for the concept PC Paul Allen showed at CES 2003 and 2004, specifically FlipStart V1.0. The original concept name was Mini-PC.

Its main competition at the time of release was the OQO Model 02. OQO had released the Model 01 at the time the FlipStart was announced 4 years earlier. They were both equipped with QWERTY keyboards and wireless capabilities but the FlipStart was a clamshell (flipped open) versus the OQO which slid up to reveal the keyboard.

== Specifications ==
The FlipStart has a folding 5.9-inch screen with 1024×700 resolution, a 30GB hard drive, built-in Wi-Fi, Bluetooth and batteries capable of running one to three hours on a charge, with extended battery life offering up to four hours. The CPU is a Pentium M ULV processor running at 1.1 GHz, and it has a non-expandable memory of 512MiB. The chipset is the Intel GMA915. A VGA resolution (640 x 480) camera is built in below the screen. The FlipStart also has built in speakers and a microphone.

The devices run the Windows XP and Windows Vista operating systems and as such can run standard PC applications such as Microsoft Office. It also has a small secondary color display in the lid similar to, but not, Windows SideShow. This is only compatible with Office/Outlook 2003 currently. Its small QWERTY keyboard has backlit buttons, and additional input devices are provided in the form of a touchpad and thumbstick located above the keyboard, a scrollwheel and media navigation buttons on the right side of the unit.

Expansion is possible via a dock connector which connects to a port replicator, offering two USB ports (blocking the single port on the unit), VGA, audio, AC power and Ethernet. A sliding cover on the lid provides access to a "snap on" expansion system. There is one expansion option provided for this, a 3.2Mp (5Mp marketed) add-on camera. The expansion cover also provides access to the built in SIM socket.

== Launch ==
The FlipStart was launched in the US on March 27, 2007 at the FlipStart web page for a price of $1999. The FlipStart (CE marked version) was launched in the UK via distributor Blazepoint on September 10, 2007, for £1449 (excluding VAT). The US price was reduced to $1499 in September 2007. On January 16, 2008, this price was reduced to $699 (£339.00 ex. VAT in the UK). In the US the FlipStart primarily shipped with Sierra Sprint Broadband EVDO communications.

In Spring of 2008, FlipStart sold out and no new units were manufactured. The company provided support for one year after that, stopping on March 31, 2009 "due to the low volume of support request and expiration of all warranties."
