= Nakasongola Airport =

- IATA: n/a; ICAO: HUNK

Summary
- Airport type: Military
- Owner: Uganda People's Defence Force
- Operator: UPDF
- Serves: Nakasongola, Uganda
- Location: Nakasongola, Uganda
- Elevation AMSL: 3,710 ft / 1,130 m
- Coordinates: 01°25′12″N 32°28′12″E

Map
- Location of Nakasongola Airport in Uganda; Placement on map is approximate

Runways
Direction	Length		Surface
Direction	ft	m	Surface
02/20	9,800	3,000	Asphalt

Nakasongola Airport (IATA: n/a, ICAO: n/a) is an airport in Uganda. As of 2013, it was one of the 47 airports in the country. It is the intended headquarters of the Air Wing of the Uganda People's Defense Force, along with Entebbe Airport, Gulu Airport, Jinja Airport and Soroti Airport, which are some of the national military airports.

== Location ==
Nakasongola Airport is located in the neighborhood known as Wabisi, approximately 12 kilometres (7 mi), north of the town of Nakasongola, Nakasongola District, in the Central Region of Uganda. It is located on the campus of Nakasongola Air Force Base, approximately 144 kilometres (89 mi), by air, directly north of Entebbe International Airport, the country's largest civilian and military airport. The geographic coordinates of Nakasongola Airport are:01°25′12″N 32°28′12″E.

== Overview ==
Nakasongola Airport is a medium-sized military airport that serves the town of Nakasongola. It is the largest stand-alone military airport in Uganda. Nakasongola Airport is approximately 1,130 metres (3,710 ft) above sea level. The airport has a single asphalt runway and taxiway that measure approximately 3,000 metres (9,800 ft) in length.

The airport and the air base on which it is located were constructed by an Israeli company in the 1970s. In 2014, after several years of disuse, the Ugandan government began a renovation of the airport which was projected to last six months and cost US$11 million (UGX:28 billion), following which the headquarters of the UPDF Air Force were to be relocated to Nakasongola to decongest Entebbe Air Force Base. However, in 2016 the construction of a radar system on the site was still incomplete and threatened by a land-use dispute. As of 2019, the relocation of the Air Force had reportedly still not occurred.

== Helicopter maintenance, repair and overhaul unit ==
In January 2022, the UPDF Air Force unveiled a helicopter maintenance, repair and overhaul (MRO) unit at the Nakasongola Air Force Base. The installation is a joint venture between National Enterprise Corporation and a Russian company called Pro Heli International Services Limited. The maintenance and repair facility is intended to repair and service Mil Mi-8, Mil Mi-17, Mil Mi-24 and related equipment in the UPDF and regional air forces at a fraction of the cost it takes to ferry the hardware back to Russia for maintenance and repairs.

== See also ==
- Ugandan Airports
- UPDF
- Sukhoi Su-30MKK
