= Vulcan Real Estate =

American holding company based in Seattle

Vale Group LLC

- Headquarters in Seattle c. 2015
- Trade name: Vulcan Real Estate
- Formerly: Vulcan Northwest; Vulcan Inc.
- Type: Private
- Industry: Philanthropy, Entertainment, Technology, Investments, Real Estate, Spaceflight, Arts
- Founded: 1986; 40 years ago
- Founders: Paul Allen; Jody Allen
- Headquarters: Seattle, Washington, United States
- Area served: Worldwide
- Key people: Bill Hilf (CEO); Jody Allen (chairwoman)
- Owner: Estate of Paul Allen
- Number of employees: ≈700 (mid-2019)
- Website: vulcanrealestate.com

Vale Group LLC, doing business as Vulcan Real Estate, is an American private holding company based in Seattle, Washington. The company was founded as Vulcan Northwest in 1986 by Microsoft co-founder Paul Allen and his sister Jody Allen to establish and oversee the family's diverse business activities and philanthropic endeavors. It includes the Paul G. Allen Estate and Trust and advises the Paul G. Allen Family Foundation.

== History ==
Vulcan Northwest was formed in Bellevue, Washington, in 1986 to manage the business affairs, investments, and philanthropic affairs of Paul Allen. The company initially had a Pacific Northwest focus. The company moved its headquarters to Seattle in 1998. In 2001, they dropped "Northwest" from the company name to reflect growing global ventures.

In 2010, the Green Sports Alliance was founded by Vulcan and the Natural Resources Defense Council. Members commit to improve their environmental performance by reducing waste, conserving energy and water, and eliminating toxic chemicals. Inaugural members and partners included Vulcan ventures such as the Seattle Seahawks, Portland Trail Blazers, and Seattle Sounders FC.

After Paul Allen's death in 2018, Vulcan co-executive Jody Allen—who also serves as the estate's executor and trustee—took the lead strategic role at Vulcan. She launched an assessment of the various Vulcan projects and enterprises based on profit or philanthropic impact. Vulcan had about 700 employees as of mid-2019, and in October 2019 was reducing some of those positions.

As of 2024, Vulcan renamed itself Vale Group.

== Areas of focus ==
=== Vulcan Real Estate ===
Vulcan's Real Estate division offers development and portfolio management services from site selection and urban planning to build-to-suit construction. Vulcan has developed 6.6 million square feet of new residential, office, retail and biotechnology research space and has a total development capacity of 10,000,000 square feet (930,000 m2).

Vulcan Real Estate redeveloped the South Lake Union neighborhood north of downtown Seattle and along the south shore of Lake Union. More than $5.7 billion has been invested in the neighborhood since 2002 for development projects and public infrastructure improvements.

Vulcan advocated for the Seattle Streetcar line known as South Lake Union Streetcar, which runs from Seattle's Westlake Center to the south end of Lake Union. The streetcar started operation on December 12, 2007. This development has been criticized as a city-supported real estate investment for Vulcan Inc., and concerns over the loss of low-income housing have been expressed..

In 2012, The Wall Street Journal called Allen's South Lake Union investment "unexpectedly lucrative" and one that led to his firm selling a 1,800,000 square feet (170,000 m2) office complex to Amazon.com for US$1.16 billion, one of the most expensive office deals ever in Seattle. "It's exceeded my expectations," Allen said of the South Lake Union development. The company also developed a five-building complex for Google near Lake Union Park. In late February 2022, Vulcan Real Estate sold the two-block, four-building Google campus overlooking Seattle's Lake Union for $802 million, a price of $1,260 per square foot that was believed to set a record for local office space.

In September 2014, Vulcan promised to invest $200 million in Yesler Terrace, southeast of downtown Seattle, buying three land parcels from the Seattle Housing Authority as part of an ambitious plan to redevelop the 30-acre low-income housing site.

==== The Hospital Club ====
In 2002, Paul Allen opened The Hospital Club in the old St. Paul's Hospital in London's Covent Garden neighborhood, a 60,000-square-foot creative hub intended to provide a professional and social hub to people working in the film, television, music, advertising, contemporary art and design, publishing and journalism, interactive media, theatre and fashion industries.

==== Museums ====
- The Flying Heritage & Combat Armor Museum displays Paul G. Allen's collection of military aircraft, tanks, and other military hardware from the United States, Germany, Japan, Russia, and the United Kingdom. The collection opened to the public in 2004 at the Arlington, Washington, airfield, then moved in 2008 to a hangar at Paine Field in Everett, Washington. Several weeks after Allen's death in 2018, the museum opened a larger hangar to preserve related stories.
- The Living Computers: Museum + Labs (LCM+L) is a computer and technology museum in the SoDo neighborhood of Seattle, Washington. LCM+L (originally known as Living Computer Museum, and before that, PDPplanet.com) was founded by Allen on January 9, 2006.
- The Museum of Pop Culture, or MoPOP (previously called EMP Museum), Is a nonprofit museum dedicated to contemporary popular culture. It was founded by Paul Allen in 2000 as the Experience Music Project. MoPOP has organized dozens of exhibits, at least 17 of which have toured across the US and internationally.
- The Seattle Art Fair displays modern and contemporary art and is a showcase for the arts community of the Pacific Northwest.
- The SIFF Cinema Downtown, previously named the Seattle Cinerama, is a downtown Seattle theater with a large screen. It was remodeled in 2014 to allow for more projection methods, and remodeled again, reopening in December 2023.
- The Upstream Music Fest + Summit is a three-day music festival.

=== Vulcan Sports and Entertainment ===
Established in 2007, Vulcan Sports and Entertainment (VSE) provides strategic oversight for Allen's professional sports franchises including the Portland Trail Blazers, the Seattle Seahawks and manages Lumen Field, WaMu Theater, the Moda Center and Veterans Memorial Coliseum (Portland, Oregon). In the fall of 2018, Chris McGowan was named CEO of Vulcan Sports and Entertainment after Peter McLoughlin left the Seahawks.

=== Research ===
Both the Allen Institute for Brain Science and the Allen Institute for Artificial Intelligence were incubated at Vulcan Inc. Started at Vulcan Inc. in 2001, the Allen Brain Atlas project sought to understand the connections between genes and brain functioning. From the project's research, Paul Allen created the Allen Institute for Brain Science in 2003 with a $100 million donation.

Project Halo came next. The project ran from 2002 to 2013, with the goal of creating a "digital Aristotle" that can correctly answer queries about scientific information, using artificial intelligence. The project led to a number of spinoff technologies, including the wiki software bundle SMW+, the Semantic Inferencing on Large Knowledge (SILK) project and the Automated User-Centered Reasoning and Acquisition System (AURA). From Project Halo's results, the Allen Institute for Artificial Intelligence was created.

=== Vulcan Productions ===
Vulcan Productions produces films, digital programs and outreach initiatives. Its programs have won awards including the George Foster Peabody Award, the Emmy Award, and the Grammy Award. Vulcan Productions closed in 2021.

=== Technology ===
Vulcan Inc. has also directly led some technology projects.

In 2003, Vulcan began developing the Vulcan FlipStart, a subnotebook with a 5.6-inch screen. The company began to manufacture and sell the FlipStart in March 2007, and ceased production in May 2008.

Vulcan Spectrum, a branch of Vulcan Inc., participated in the United States 2008 wireless spectrum auction, and paid US$69 million for "A Block" spectrum in the Seattle-Tacoma-Bremerton area, and US$43.6 million for "A Block" spectrum in Portland-Salem.

Vulcan Aerospace is a subsidiary of Vulcan Inc. set up in 2015 to help achieve Paul Allen's desire to make commercial space travel more convenient and less expensive. Vulcan Aerospace oversaw the development of Stratolaunch Systems project, an air launch system being developed 2010–2019 to transport payloads to low Earth orbit using a large carrier aircraft. In 2016, initial test flights were projected to take place as early as 2016. In September 2016, Vulcan Aerospace President Chuck Beames left his role leading the effort and was replaced by an interim executive director: "Jean Floyd, the CEO of Vulcan’s Stratolaunch Systems." Although the super-sized Stratolaunch carrier aircraft first flew on April 13, 2019, at the Mojave Air and Space Port in a 2 h 29 min flight, Vulcan announced in May 2019 that the company would cease operations. The assets of Stratolaunch, including all intellectual property and the 385 feet (117 m)-wingspan carrier aircraft—"the world’s largest aircraft to fly"—were put up for sale for US$400 million in June 2019. Stratolaunch was sold and the new owner was identified in December 2019 to be Cerberus Capital Management. Stratolaunch continued to operate under new ownership.

=== Philanthropy ===
In 2014, Vulcan Inc. partnered with Elephants Without Borders to secure a $7.3 million grant to conduct the Great Elephant Census. The census was designed to provide accurate and up-to-date data about the number and distribution of African elephants by using standardized aerial surveys of thousands of square miles. Prior to the survey, many countries had not conducted surveying flights in as many as 10 years. Dozens of researchers flying in small planes captured comprehensive observational data of elephants and elephant carcasses. The census was completed in 2016, finding that elephant populations had declined by as much as 30 percent over the previous seven years as a result of poaching.

In February 2016, Allen announced that Vulcan would donate $2 million in grants to stop the spread of the Zika virus. Most of the funds went to mosquito control efforts in countries where the virus was quickly spreading, while the remainder was used to fund a diagnostic test.
