= Bill Hilf =

American CEO for Vale Group

- Occupations: Board Chair, Allen Institute for AI 2017-Present ; Board Chair, American Prairie 2021-Present

Bill Hilf is an American technology executive and science fiction author. He serves as chair of the board of directors of the Allen Institute for AI (Ai2) and as chair of the National Board of Directors of American Prairie.

Hilf previously served as chief executive officer of Vale Group, formerly Vulcan Inc., from December 2016 to May 2024. Before joining Vulcan, he was senior vice president and general manager of Hewlett Packard Enterprise's Cloud business unit. He previously spent approximately ten years at Microsoft, holding leadership roles in open-source strategy, Windows Server, technical computing, and Microsoft Azure.

Hilf is also a science fiction author. His debut novel, The Disruption, was published in April 2026.

== Career ==
=== IBM ===
During his tenure at IBM, Hilf held the role of a senior software architect and helped to build the company's Open-source strategy in the early 2000s. According to Wired, “IBM was one of the first companies to realize the benefits of software that anyone can use and modify for free.”

Hilf was also a co-inventor on several IBM patents involving distributed computing, including grid computing technologies, as well as Voice over IP (VoIP) telecommunications. His inventions included methods for debugging distributed computing environments and enabling mobile VoIP calls to transition between wireless and cellular networks. In a 2011 profile, HPCwire reported that Hilf held more than 10 patents in distributed computing.

=== Microsoft ===
Hilf joined Microsoft in 2004 to help the company understand and engage with the open-source software community. He helped establish an open-source technology lab to study interoperability between Linux and Windows systems and explore opportunities for collaboration with open-source developers. A 2007 Redmond Magazine feature described Hilf, then general manager of platform strategy, as overseeing Microsoft's approach to open-source software, including Linux interoperability, partnerships with independent software vendors, and participation in open-source communities. The article also included assessments from industry analysts of Microsoft's changing relationship with open-source development.

Hilf subsequently held leadership positions in Microsoft's Windows Server and Technical Computing businesses. In January 2008, eWeek ranked Hilf 12th on its list of the 25 most influential people at Microsoft, citing his work on software interoperability and platform strategy.

As general manager of Microsoft's Technical Computing Group, Hilf focused on expanding the use of high-performance computing (HPC) beyond traditional scientific and supercomputing environments. In September 2010, he introduced Windows HPC Server 2008 R2 at the High Performance Computing Financial Markets Conference in New York. The release enabled the integration of on-premises computing clusters with Microsoft's Azure cloud platform, allowing organizations to access additional computing capacity on demand. Hilf advocated making HPC more accessible to businesses and developers, particularly for financial modeling, simulation, and other computationally intensive applications.

In 2011, Hilf joined the leadership team for Microsoft Azure, alongside executives including Satya Nadella and Scott Guthrie. As general manager of Windows Azure, Hilf was involved in the company's transition toward a broader cloud computing platform. During this period, Azure expanded its support for Linux virtual machines, open-source development tools, and infrastructure-as-a-service capabilities.

In an October 2012 interview with Wired, Hilf described Azure as a central component of Microsoft's strategy to become a devices and services company. He emphasized making cloud services accessible to enterprise customers while preserving their existing investments in Microsoft infrastructure. His work at Azure also coincided with Microsoft's growing support for open-source technologies, including Node.js, Apache Hadoop, and Linux.

=== Hewlett-Packard ===
In 2013, Hilf joined HP with the goal of helping the company become “the world’s best provider for enterprises who want to build hybrid clouds” according to Wired. As its senior vice president, Hilf led the HP Cloud Research and Development and business operations. In 2016, Hilf left Hewlett Packard Enterprise amid a restructuring of its cloud business. Business Insider subsequently reported on his departure and noted that HP had discontinued its public cloud service. In an email to GeekWire, Hilf wrote, “For me personally, when I joined, I made a commitment to build the cloud business here at HP for three years, and I’m now 3 years and one month in, and we have had very strong growth – just this past June HPE Helion was recognized as a leader in the private cloud market for the third year in a row. So this is the right time for me to help move the technologies and teams more deeply into the company, and to pursue new opportunities.”

=== Vulcan Inc. ===
In December 2016, Hilf became chief executive officer of Vulcan Inc., succeeding Microsoft co-founder Paul Allen, who remained the company's chairman. Vulcan managed Allen's diverse business and philanthropic interests, including real estate development, investments, scientific research, aerospace, conservation, media, and arts and culture. As CEO, Hilf oversaw the company's commercial and philanthropic operations, which included initiatives addressing wildlife conservation, ocean health, and climate change.

During Hilf's tenure, Vulcan developed and supported technology-based conservation initiatives, including EarthRanger, a platform used to monitor wildlife and assist anti-poaching operations; Skylight, a system for detecting illegal fishing activity; and the Allen Coral Atlas, which uses satellite imagery and analytical tools to map and monitor coral reefs. In a 2020 NPR interview, Hilf discussed the use of satellite technology to make large-scale coral reef mapping possible, describing the project's collaboration with scientific institutions, governments, and local communities. In September 2018, Vulcan received the International Conservation Caucus Foundation's Conservation Leadership in Business Award, with Hilf representing the company as CEO.

Following Allen's death in October 2018, Hilf continued as CEO while Jody Allen assumed oversight of the Allen estate and served as chair of Vulcan. The company subsequently underwent a restructuring of its business and philanthropic portfolio, including the transfer of technology initiatives into other organizations.

In August 2019, Vulcan Capital, the investment arm of Vulcan Inc., opened its first international office in Singapore, with plans to invest an initial US$100 million in Southeast Asian startups. In an interview with Bloomberg, Hilf discussed the firm's expansion into the region and said Vulcan had spent nearly three years evaluating Singapore as a base for its Asian investment activities.

In March 2021, Vulcan announced that it would transfer its environmental technology portfolio to the Allen Institute for AI (Ai2), including EarthRanger, Skylight, climate modeling research, and approximately 50 employees. Hilf described the transition as bringing together Allen's interests in artificial intelligence and environmental conservation, while expanding Ai2's research mission.

Vulcan was renamed Vale Group in 2024. In May 2024, it was announced that Hilf would step down as CEO at the end of the month, following more than seven years in the role. The company announced that it would not appoint a replacement CEO, with its existing leadership team instead reporting directly to Jody Allen.

=== Allen Institute for AI ===
Bill Hilf has served as chair of the board of directors of the Allen Institute for AI (Ai2), a Seattle-based nonprofit artificial intelligence research institute founded by Paul Allen in 2014, since 2017.

Hilf has participated in the board's searches for new chief executives, including the search that resulted in the appointment of Ali Farhadi as CEO in July 2023. The nearly year-long search considered more than 50 candidates. Following Farhadi's departure in March 2026, the board began another search for a permanent CEO.

Hilf has emphasized Ai2's continued role in open-source artificial intelligence research, including its development of the OLMo family of open language models. In a March 2026 interview with GeekWire, he reaffirmed the institute's commitment to open AI research and highlighted its work applying artificial intelligence to scientific and societal challenges, including climate, conservation, and health. He also emphasized the importance of scientific expertise, nonprofit leadership experience, and a commitment to open science in the selection of Ai2's next CEO.

== Writing ==
Hilf writes science fiction under the name W. H. Hilf. His debut novel, The Disruption, was published by Atmosphere Press in April 2026 as the first installment of The Disruption Cycle. The novel follows survivors of an artificial intelligence-related collapse on Earth and a human colony on Proxima Centauri b. Kirkus Reviews noted its combination of science fiction and folk horror, while Independent Book Review examined its treatment of technological ambition, religious authoritarianism, and the ethical consequences of innovation.

In 2026, The Disruption won the Science Fiction: Post-Apocalyptic category of the American Fiction Awards and the Dystopian category of the IndieReader Discovery Awards.

== Philanthropy ==
=== American Prairie ===
Hilf serves as chair of the National Board of Directors of American Prairie, a Montana-based nonprofit conservation organization working to conserve and connect prairie habitat in the Great Plains, while providing greater public access to nature. In April 2024, the organization announced that Hilf would succeed George E. Matelich as board chair, effective May 1, 2024. Matelich had held the position since 2013.

Hilf's appointment preceded his departure as chief executive of Vale Group, formerly Vulcan Inc. In May 2024, GeekWire reported that Hilf expected to spend more time in Montana and pursue personal and charitable interests while remaining involved in nonprofit leadership.

In a 2026 interview with GeekWire, Hilf discussed parallels between natural ecosystems and artificial intelligence systems. The interview connected his involvement in prairie conservation with his views on the development and management of AI technologies.

=== High Five Hope ===
On a business trip to the Philippines for Microsoft in 2008, Hilf came across kids playing basketball on the streets with rags wrapped into a ball. As a former basketball player and amateur coach himself, he joined in. That experience led him to think about using sports as a tool to help kids. In 2008, Hilf launched High Five Hope, a non-profit aimed at “bringing the power of structured, supportive sports programs to street children in the Philippines. Initially, focused on basketball, High Five Hope has expanded to include a variety of sports like girls’ volleyball and futkal—a type of street soccer. In May 2010, The Philippine Star reported that the organization had organized annual sports festivals and launched an "I Give Hope" campaign to collect donated sporting equipment. The newspaper reported that more than 300 children had attended the previous year's Hope Sports Festival.

=== Microsoft ===
In his years at Microsoft, Hilf served as the company's executive sponsor to the United Nations High Commissioner for Refugees (UNHCR), helping to build computer labs in refugee camps. He was also a divisional leader for the Microsoft “Give” campaigns.
