= Lutembe Bay =

Wetland in Uganda

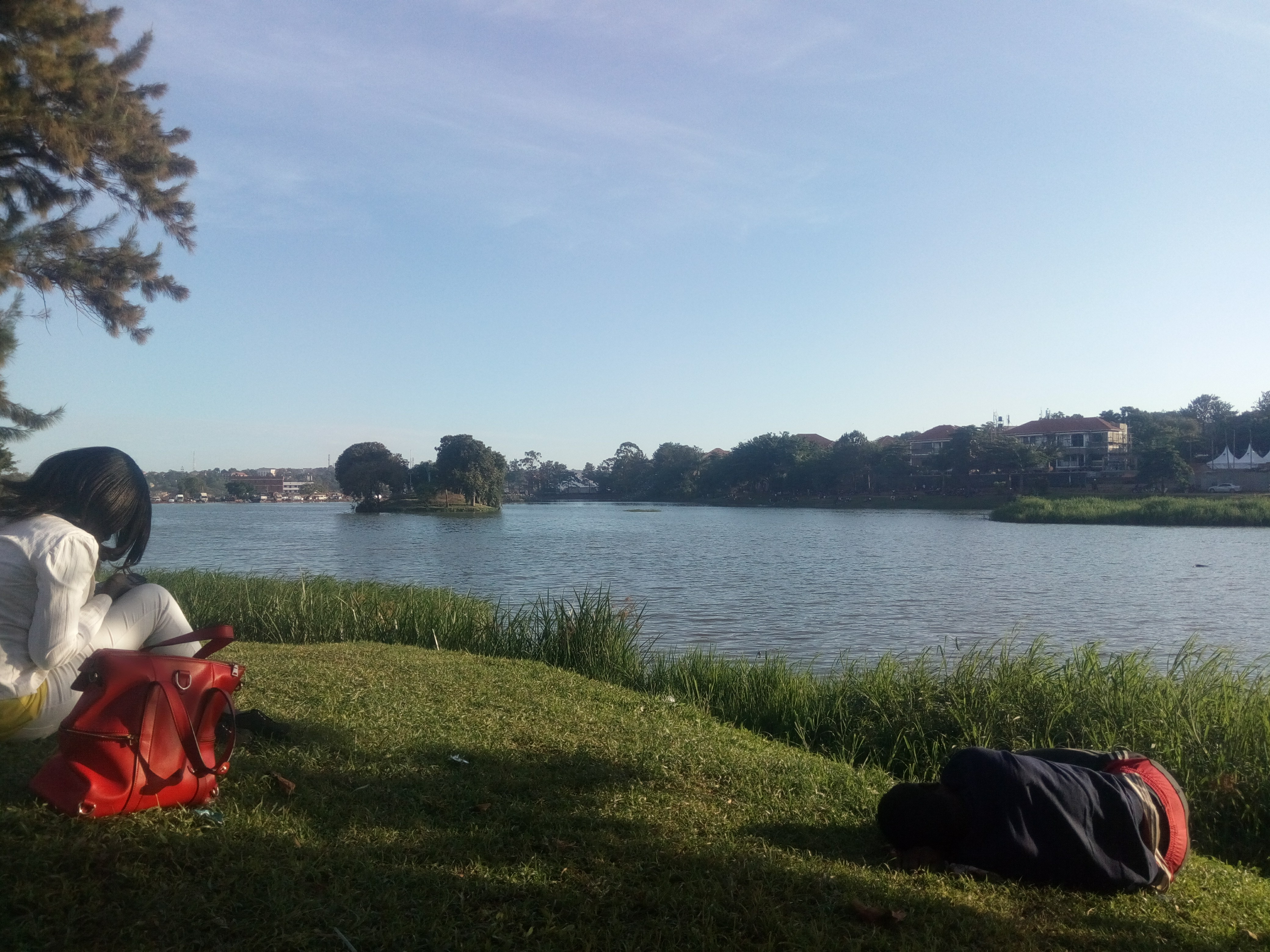

- Location within Uganda
- Coordinates: 0.1541°N 32.5681°E
- Basin countries: Uganda
- Surface area: 800 hectares (3.1 mi^{2})
- Surface elevation: 1,130 metres (3,710 ft)

Ramsar Wetland
- Official name: Lutembe Bay Wetland System
- Designated: 15 September 2006
- Reference no.: 1637

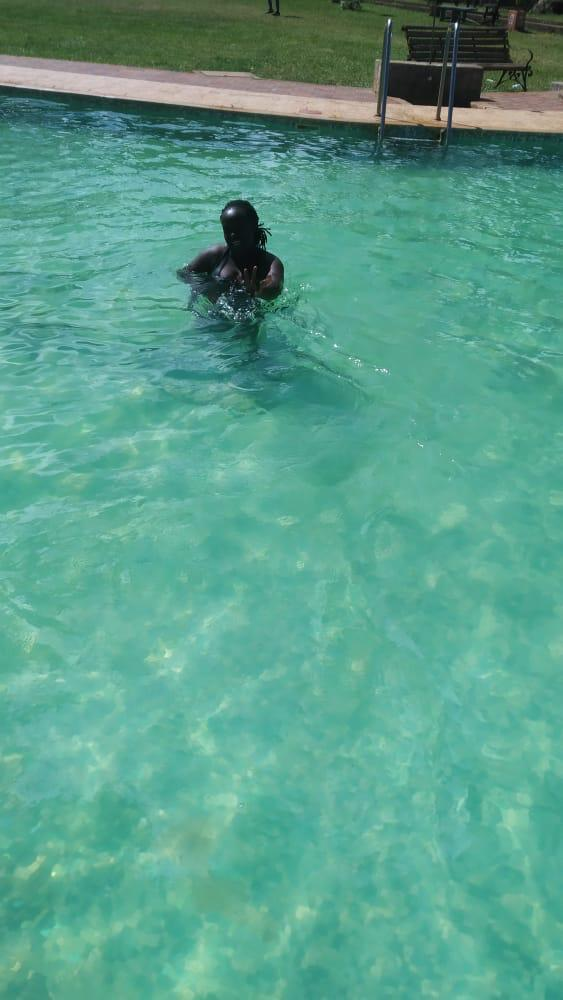
Lutembe Beach

Lutembe Bay is a wetland on the edge of Lake Victoria.

== Location ==
Lutembe Bay is located in Wakiso District and covers areas of Katabi, Kajjansi and Makindye Ssabagabo Town Councils.

It lies on these co-ordinates 00°10ʹ N 32°34ʹ E.

== Conservation ==
Lutumbe Bay is one of Uganda's 33 Important Bird Areas and since 2006 a Ramsar-listed wetland of international importance. The bay is notable for its population of as many as 1.5m white-winged tern.

in 2013 a portion of the wetland was illegally filled with soil by the flower export giant Rosebud Ltd.

== Importance ==
The Lutumbe Bay hosts different birds such as white-winged black terns, grey and black headed gulls, gull-billed terns. It is also a breeding ground for some birds from Europe and a tourist place.

== Pollution ==
Agrochemicals from the surrounding flower farms get into the wetland as a result of leaching.
