= Nakasongola =

- Location in Uganda
- Coordinates: 01°18′54″N 32°27′54″E
- Country: Uganda
- Region: Central Region of Uganda
- District: Nakasongola District
- Elevation: 3,810 ft (1,160 m)

Population (2020 Estimate)
  - Total: 11,700

Nakasongola is a town in Nakasongola District in the Central Region of Uganda. The town is the site of the district headquarters.

== Location ==
Nakasongola is approximately 118 kilometres (73 mi) north of Kampala, the capital and largest city of Uganda, on an all-weather tarmac highway between Kampala and Masindi. The coordinates of the town are 1°18'54.0"N, 32°27'54.0"E (Latitude:1.3150; Longitude:32.4650).

== Population ==
The population of Nakasongola town was estimated at 6,500 during the 2002 national census. In 2006, the population was estimated at 6,920. At the 2014 national population census and household survey, the population of Nakasongola was enumerated at 10,289.

In 2015, Uganda Bureau of Statistics (UBOS) estimated the town's population at 10,100. In 2020, the population agency estimated the mid-year population of Nakasongola town at 11,700 people, of whom 6,200 (53 percent) were male and 5,500 (47 percent) female. The UBOS calculated the population growth rate of the town to average 2.98 percent per year, between 2015 and 2020.

Historical population
Year	Pop.	±%
2002	6,500	—
2006	6,920	+6.5%
2014	10,289	+48.7%
2015	10,100	−1.8%
2020	11,700	+15.8%

== Points of interest ==
The following points of interest are located in the town of Nakasongola or near its borders: (a) the offices of Nakasongola Town Council (b) the offices of Nakasongola District local government (c) Nakasongola Air Force Base, part of the Uganda People's Defence Force (UPDF) (d) Nakasongola Airport, located on Nakasongola Air Force Base (e) Uganda Military Air Force Academy, a training school of the UPDF Air Force, also located on Nakasongola Air Force Base (f) Uganda Air Defence and Artillery School, another training school of the UPDF, also located on Nakasongola Air Force Base (g) Nakasongola central market (h) A branch of PostBank Uganda and (i) Ziwa Rhino Sanctuary, approximately 50 kilometres (31 mi), by road, northwest of Nakasongola, on the Nakasongola-Masindi Highway.

== See also ==
- List of military schools in Uganda
- List of airports in Uganda
- List of cities and towns in Uganda
