= Ziwa Rhino Sanctuary =

Animal sanctuary in Uganda

Ziwa Rhino and Wildlife Ranch

- Location within Uganda
- Location: Mukerenge Village, Nakasongola District, Uganda
- Nearest city: Nakasongola
- Coordinates: 01°29′08″N 32°05′43″E
- Area: 70 square kilometres (27 mi^{2})
- Established: 2005; 21 years ago
- Governing body: Uganda Wildlife Authority
- Website: Website

Ziwa Rhino and Wildlife Ranch is a private animal sanctuary in Uganda. Established in 2005 to re-introduce Southern White Rhinos in the wild, the ranch is the only place in the country where one can observe these endangered creatures in the wild. The ranch is collaborative effort between Ziwa Rhino and Wildlife Ranch, who owns the land on which the sanctuary sits, and the Uganda Wildlife Authority, the government agency responsible for protecting Uganda's wildlife resources. As of June 2024, the ranch was home to 41 rhinos.

== Location ==
The ranch is located approximately 164 kilometres (102 mi), by road, north of Kampala, Uganda's capital and largest city. This location is near Mukerenge Village, Nakasongola District, in the Kafu River Basin, off of the Kampala–Gulu Highway. The geographical coordinates of the ranch are:1°29'08.0"N, 32°05'43.0"E (Latitude:1.485556; Longitude:32.095278).

== Overview ==
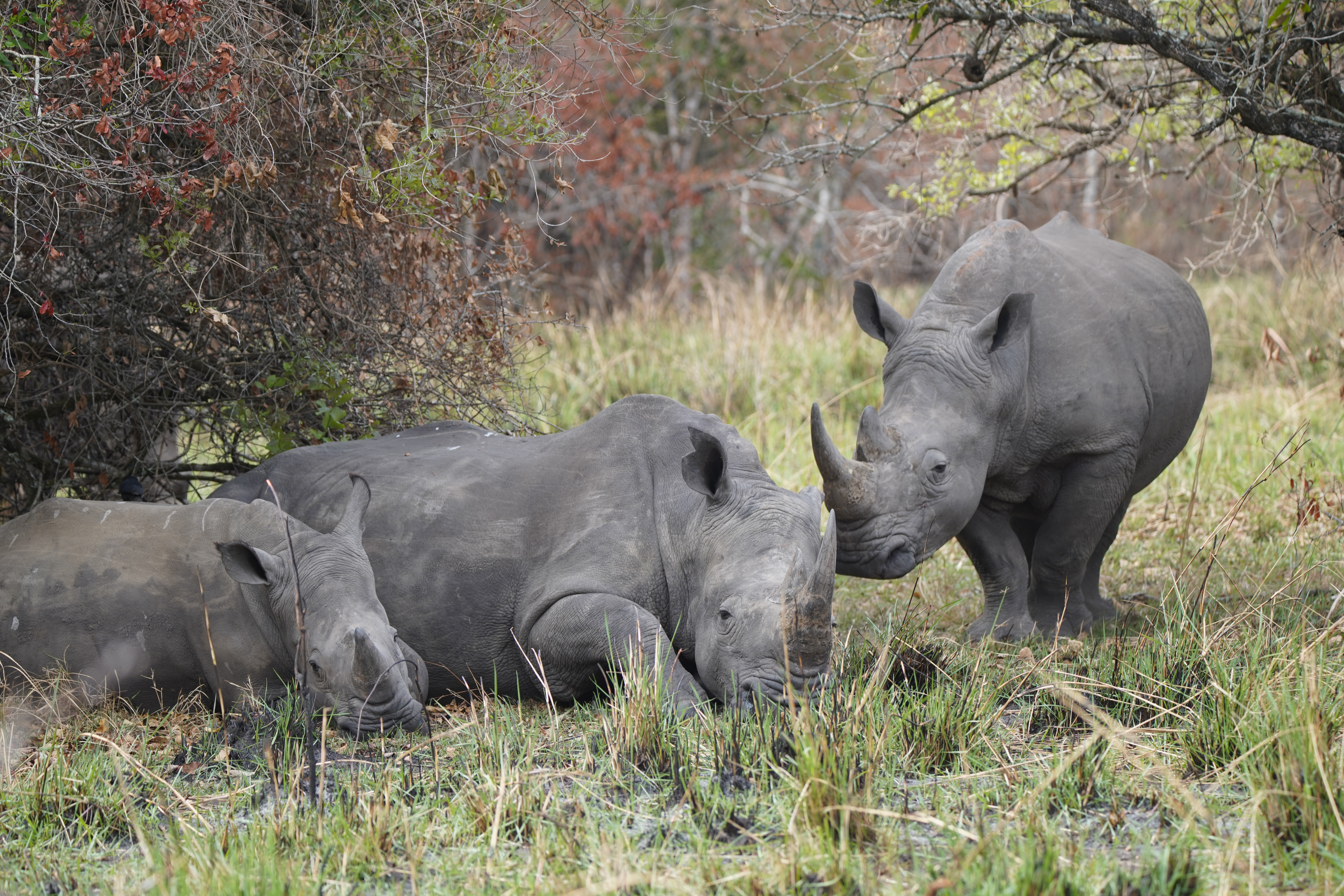
White rhinos in the sanctuary (2022)

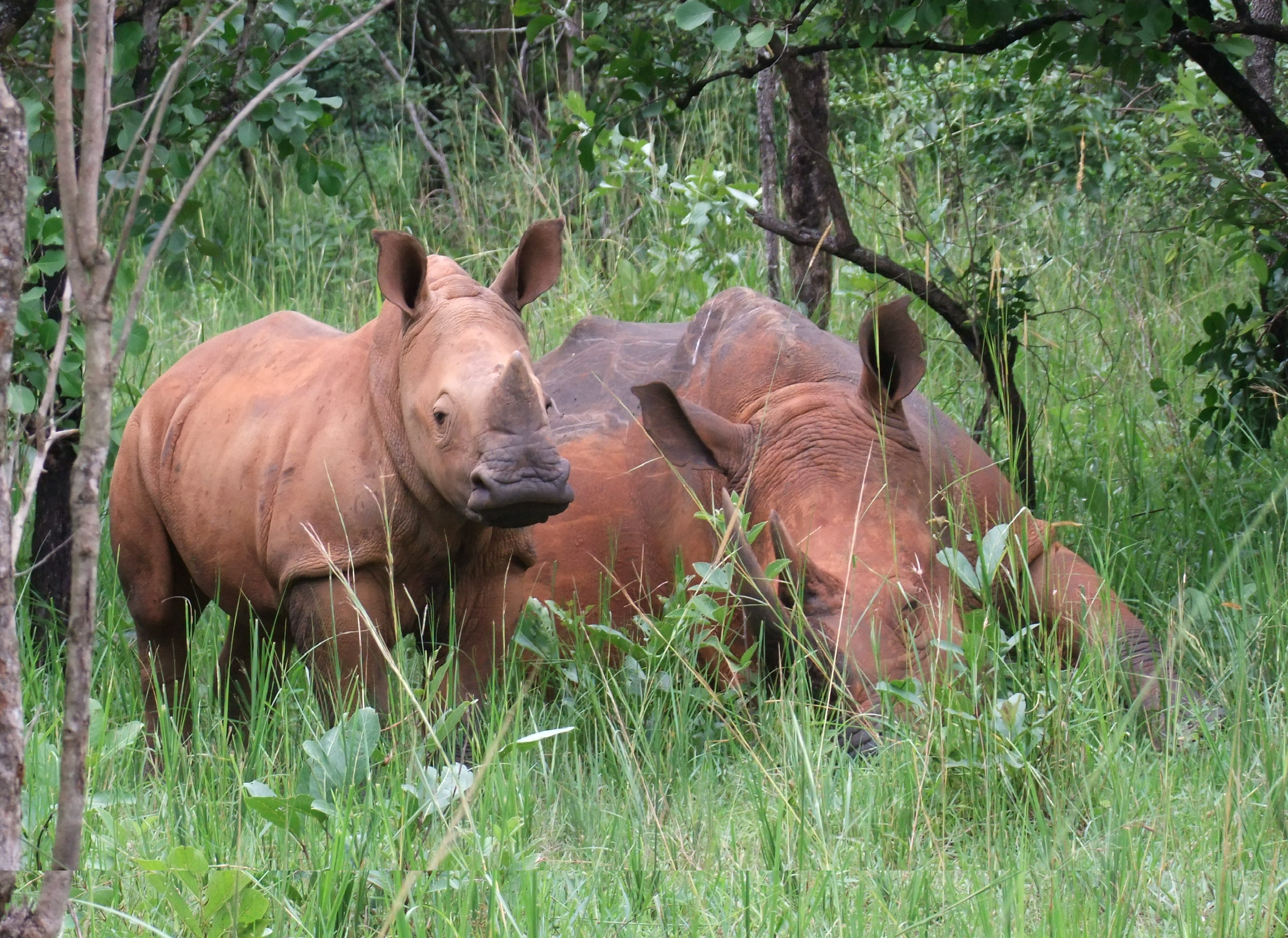
Rhinos in Ziwa Rhino Sanctuary (2012): Bella and Donna (the calf)

Ziwa Rhino and Wildlife Ranch is a collaborative effort between the Uganda Wildlife Authority, and Ziwa Rhino and Wildlife Ranch Limited, a private land management company committed to the restoration of Uganda's rhinoceros population. The ranch offers a secure place where rhino populations can be expanded by breeding, protected from human and non-human predators and gradually re-introduced into Uganda's national parks, while at the same time, allowing the public to enjoy these majestic animals, as the project moves forward.

A team of approximately 78 park rangers and security guards keep watch on the rhinos 24 hours daily, seven days a week, to ensure their safety. The 70 square kilometres (27 mi^{2}) ranch is surrounded by a 2 metres (6.6 ft) electric fence to keep the rhinos in and the intruders out. The ranch is home to at least 40 mammal and reptilian species including monkeys, antelopes, hippopotamuses, crocodiles, tortoise, and numerous bird species. Tourist facilities at the ranch include luxury accommodation, rest rooms, camp grounds, a restaurant, bar and pool. In addition to on-foot rhino trekking, tourist activities include birding, shoebill trekking, nature rides and nature walks.

== History ==
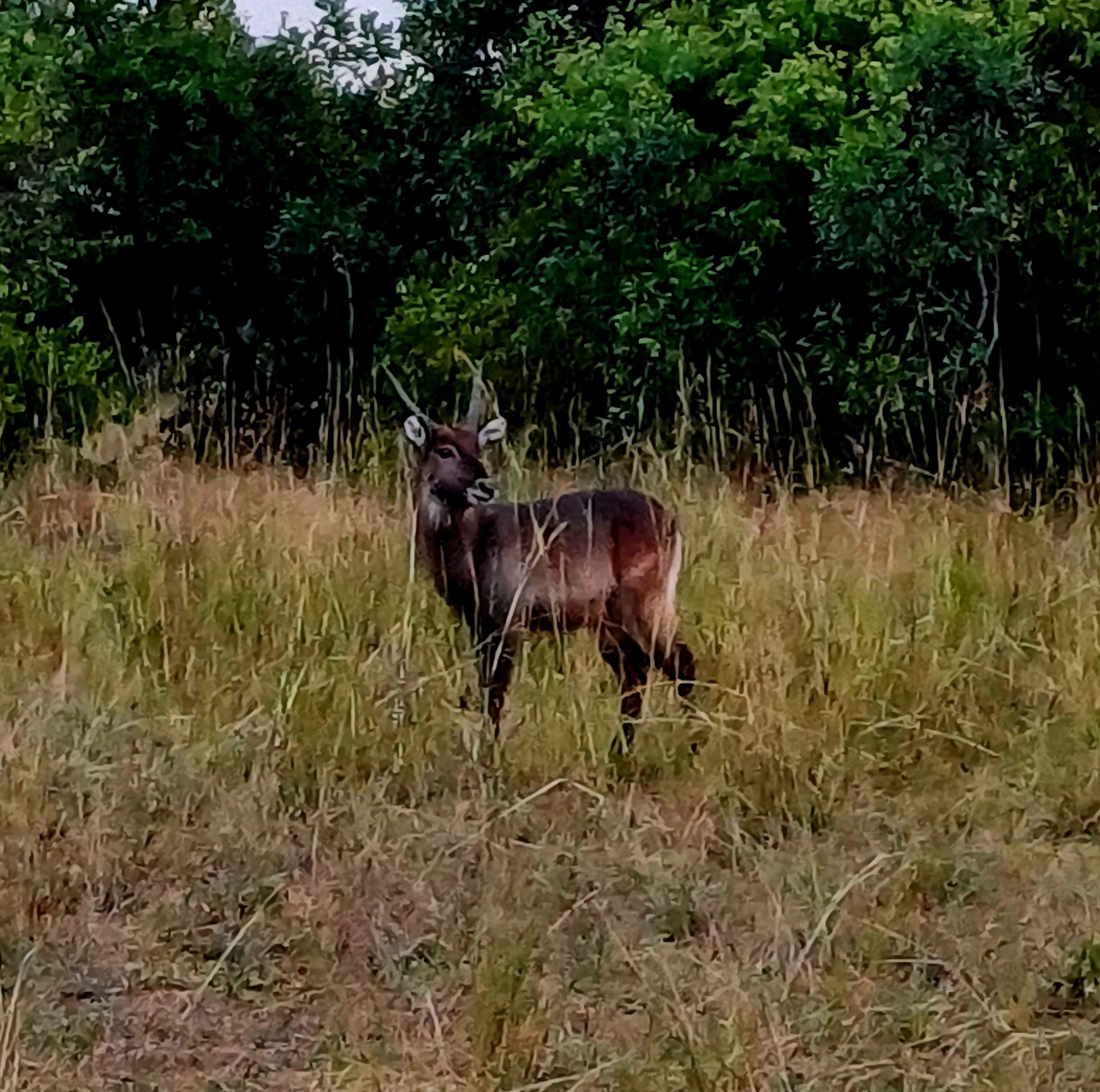
Waterbuck at Ziwa Rhino Sanctuary

Both the Black Rhinoceros (Diceros bicornis michaeli) and the Northern white rhinoceros (Ceratotherium simum cottoni), are indigenous to Uganda. However, due to a number of factors, including prolonged armed human conflict, poaching and the mismanagement of their natural habitat, by 1982, both species had been wiped out in the country. Ziwa Rhino and Wildlife Ranch was established in 2005 to reintroduce the southern white rhinoceros to Uganda. The long-term goal of the ranch is to "build a sustainable rhinoceros population and relocate rhinos back to their original habitat in Uganda's protected areas". As of January 2010, Ziwa Rhino and Wildlife Ranch was the only location in Uganda, where rhinos can be observed in their natural habitat.

Starting with a total of six animals, four that were bought from Solio Ranch in Kenya and two donated from Disney's Animal Kingdom in Orlando, Florida, in the United States, the rhino population had grown to thirteen as of June 2013. Following the birth of another calf in April 2014, the total rhino population at Ziwa Rhino and Wildlife Ranch rose to 15. As of March 2018, the rhino numbers at the ranch had increased to twenty-two animals, and 33 in December 2021. The population has increased to 48 as of July 2025.

Uganda launched, the “Name a Rhino” campaign in 2023 to allows individuals to directly support the protection of rhinos in Uganda. The initiative offers a distinctive opportunity for participants to contribute to conservation efforts, such as veterinary care and habitat preservation, while leaving a lasting legacy through the naming of individual rhinos. The campaign also draws attention to the recovery of rhino populations, a species that was once extinct in Uganda’s wild landscapes.

== See also ==
- Ugandan National Parks
