= Otze Forest Wildlife Sanctuary =

Wildlife sanctuary in Uganda

Coordinates: 3.6852°N 31.9027°E

The Otze Forest Wildlife Sanctuary is a government-managed wildlife sanctuary in Uganda. The site covers 0.39 km (0.24 mi)^{2}.
