= Kidepo Valley National Park =

National park in Uganda

- IUCN category II (national park)
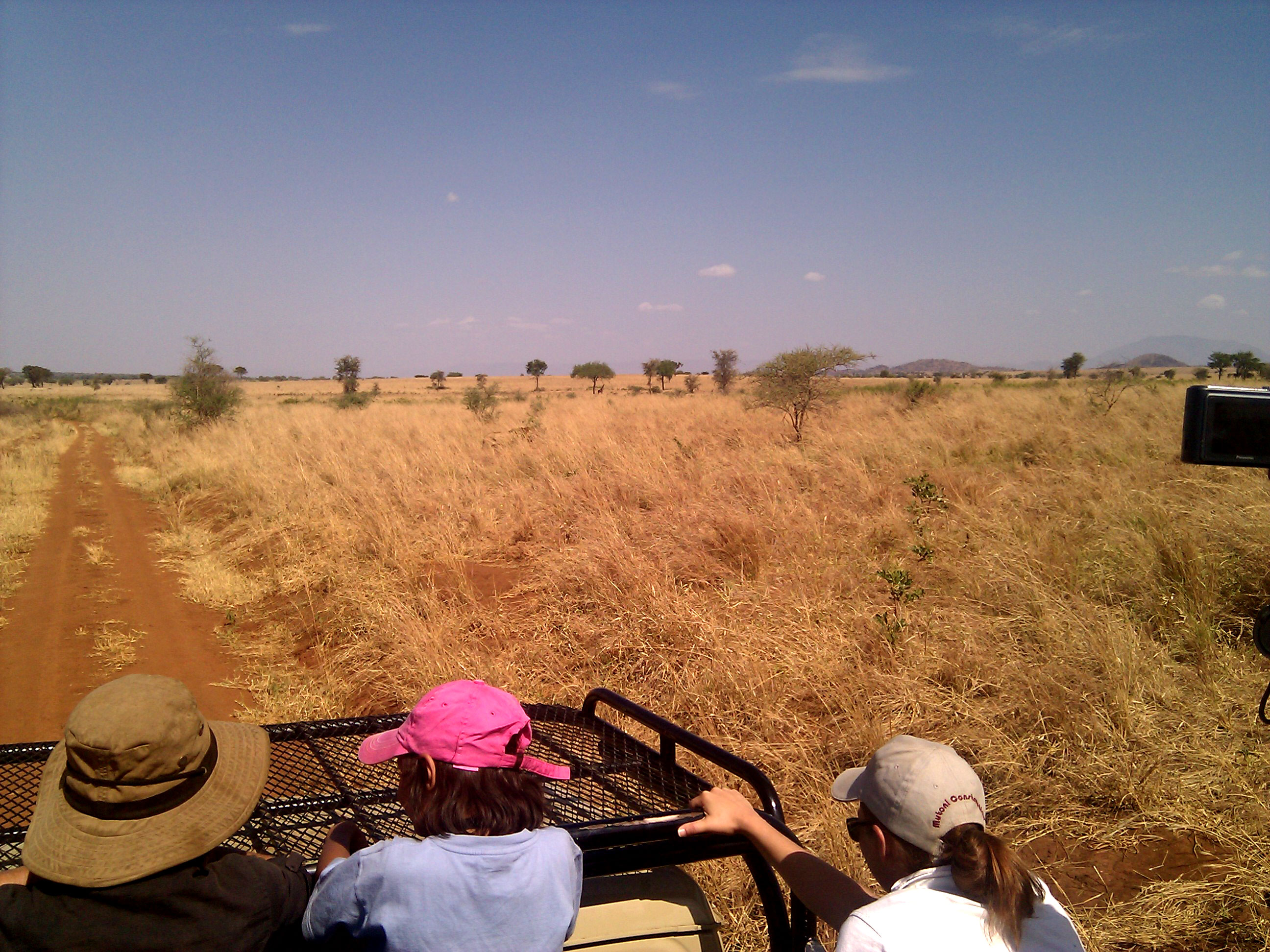

- Location in Uganda
- Location: Karenga Karamoja, Northern Region, Uganda, Uganda
- Coordinates: 3°54′N 33°51′E
- Area: 1,442 km^{2} (557 sq mi)
- Established: 1958
- Named for: Kidebo, meaning 'Help us'
- Operator: Uganda Wildlife Authority

Kidepo Valley National Park is a 1,442 km^{2} (557 sq mi) large national park in the Karamoja region of northeastern Uganda. It encompasses rugged savannah at the foothills of Mount Morungole and is transected by the Kidepo and Narus rivers.

== Location ==
Kidepo Valley National Park is located near Karenga in Kaabong District in northeastern Uganda. The park is approximately 220 km (140 mi), by road northwest of Moroto, the largest town in the sub-region. It is approximately 520 km (320 mi), by road, northeast of Kampala, Uganda's capital and largest city.

The northwestern boundary of the park runs along the international frontier with Bira, South Sudan and abuts against its Kidepo Game Reserve.

== History ==
The Ik and Ketebo (or Mening) are the original inhabitants of the area, who had been living here since 1800. It was gazetted as a game reserve by the British colonial government in 1958, and the people were evicted. The purpose was both to protect wildlife from hunting and to prevent further clearing of bush for tsetse fly-control. The forceful relocation of the resident people and the resultant famine was cited by anthropologist Colin Turnbull and park management as an example of the unacceptable consequences of not taking community needs into account when designating reserves.

The newly independent government of Uganda under Milton Obote converted the reserve into the Kidepo Valley National Park in 1962.

In 1967 the construction of a luxury lodge on the Katurum kopje was started with the support of a Swedish consortium. The original 56-room project was never completed, and by 1978 it had been abandoned and vandalized. The site was revived and finally opened with 100 rooms in 2019.

In 1972 the last British chief warden of the park, Ian Ross, handed over to a relatively junior Ugandan, Paul Ssali. This handover was the subject of the 1974 American documentary film, "The Wild and the Brave".

== Geology ==
The park consists of the two major valley systems of the Kidepo and Narus Rivers. The valley floors lie between 3,000 feet (910 m) and 4,000 feet (1,200 m) AMSL.

Kanangorok (also spelled Kananorok or Kanatarok) is a tepid hot spring in the extreme north of the park, in Lotukei, South Sudanese boundary. This spring is the most permanent source of water in the park.

The soil in the park is clayey. In the Kidepo Valley, black chalky clay and sandy-clay loam predominate, while the Narus Valley has freer-draining red clays and loams.

== Wildlife ==
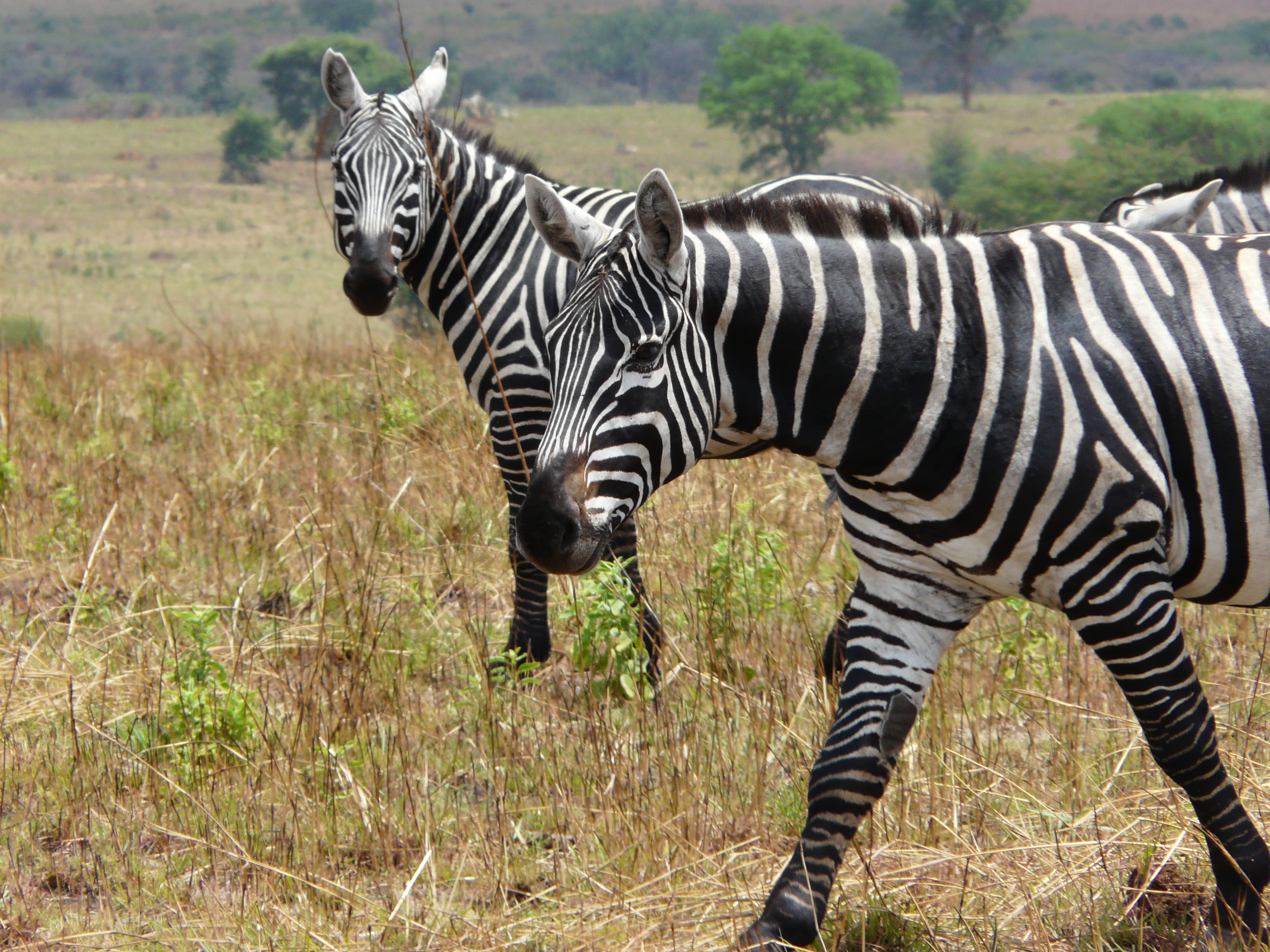
Maneless zebras, a form of the plains zebra

Kidepo hosts over 77 mammal species and 476 bird species. Most of the park is open tree savanna. Because of differences in rainfall with annual averages of 89 cm (35 in) in Narus and 64 cm (25 in) in the Kidepo valleys, vegetation and animal populations vary between the two valleys.

=== Narus Valley ===
Narus is a name given by the Ketebo or Mening or Amening Clan which were the people living in the Valley. Primary grasses in the Narus Valley are the shorter red oat grass and taller bunchy Guinea grass and fine thatching grass. Common trees in the drier areas are red thorn acacias, desert dates, and to a lesser extent drumstick trees. Sausage trees and fan palms line the water courses. Euphorbia candelabrum and the shorter monkey bread and Buffalo thorn trees are also present.

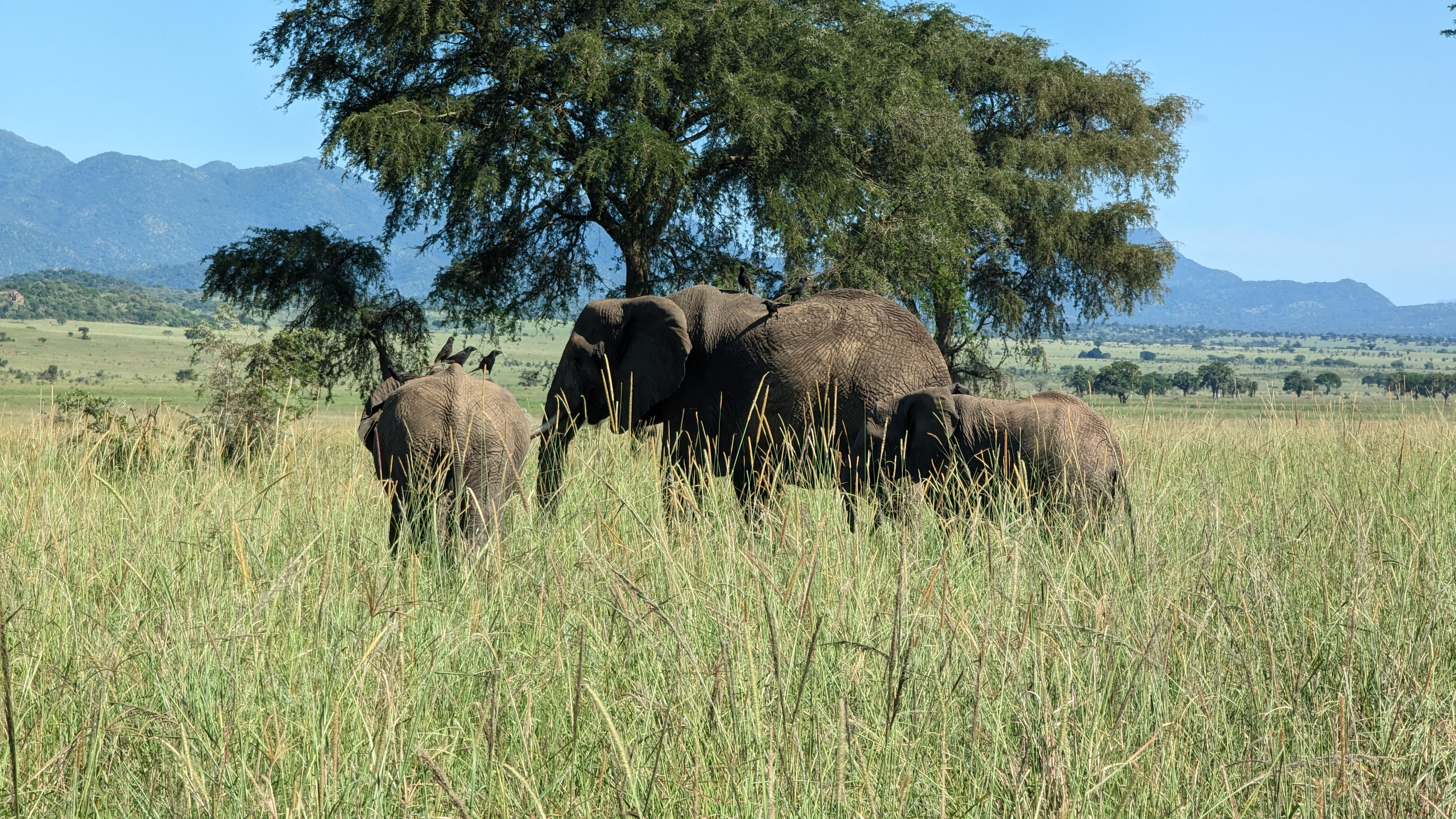
Elephants in Kidepo Valley National Park in Uganda

=== Kidepo Valley ===
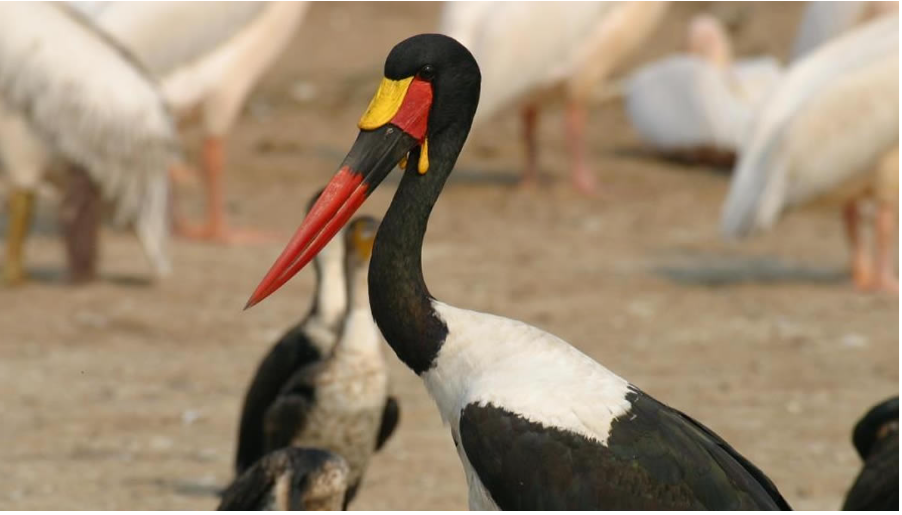
Bird species in Kidepo National Park

Streams in the Kidepo Valley are dotted with palms, whereas whistling thorn acacia bushes are growing in higher elevated areas. Compared to the Narus Valley, this area is less accessible and has been subject to more poaching and insecurity.

== Park management ==
The park is managed by the Uganda Wildlife Authority. The USAID as of August 2013 was financing the improvement of roads within the park.

=== Leadership ===
The administration of the park is led by a Chief Warden. This position has been held by the following wardens:

- 1958–1962 Tony Henley
- 1964–1974 Ian Ross
- 1974–1978 Paul Ssali
- –1981 Augustine Bendebule (died in air crash in the park)
- 1994– Peter Lotyang
- 1996 Anjelo Ajoka
- 1998 (acting) Daniel Aleper
- 2001-2002 Joseph Sentongo
- 2003-2006 Kuloao Okwongo

Edward Asalu as chief park warden Capt. John Emille Otekat also worked as chief park warden

- 2008 Henry Tusubira
- 2013 Johnson Masereka
- 2021 Samuel Amanya

=== Finances ===
In the fiscal year 2009-2010 Kidepo received USh 294 million (US$129,000 or €99,000 as of August 1, 2010) from 2,100 visitors. By the 2012-2013 fiscal year this had grown to USh 466 million ($178,000 or €134,000 as of August 1, 2013) from 2300 visitors.

=== Conservation activity ===
==== Elephant ====
Elephants were poached to extinction in the Kidepo area in the decade beginning 1900. The Protectorate of Uganda government did not extend into Karamoja, allowing unchecked the "wholesale slaughter and the wounding of enormous numbers of elephants" for the trade of ivory through Kaabong and onward to Maji, Ethiopia. Anti-poaching enforcement in and around the park allowed elephant populations to recover somewhat by 1951. The population was estimated around 400 in 2003. In 2014 the number was estimated between 407 and 552.

==== Giraffe ====
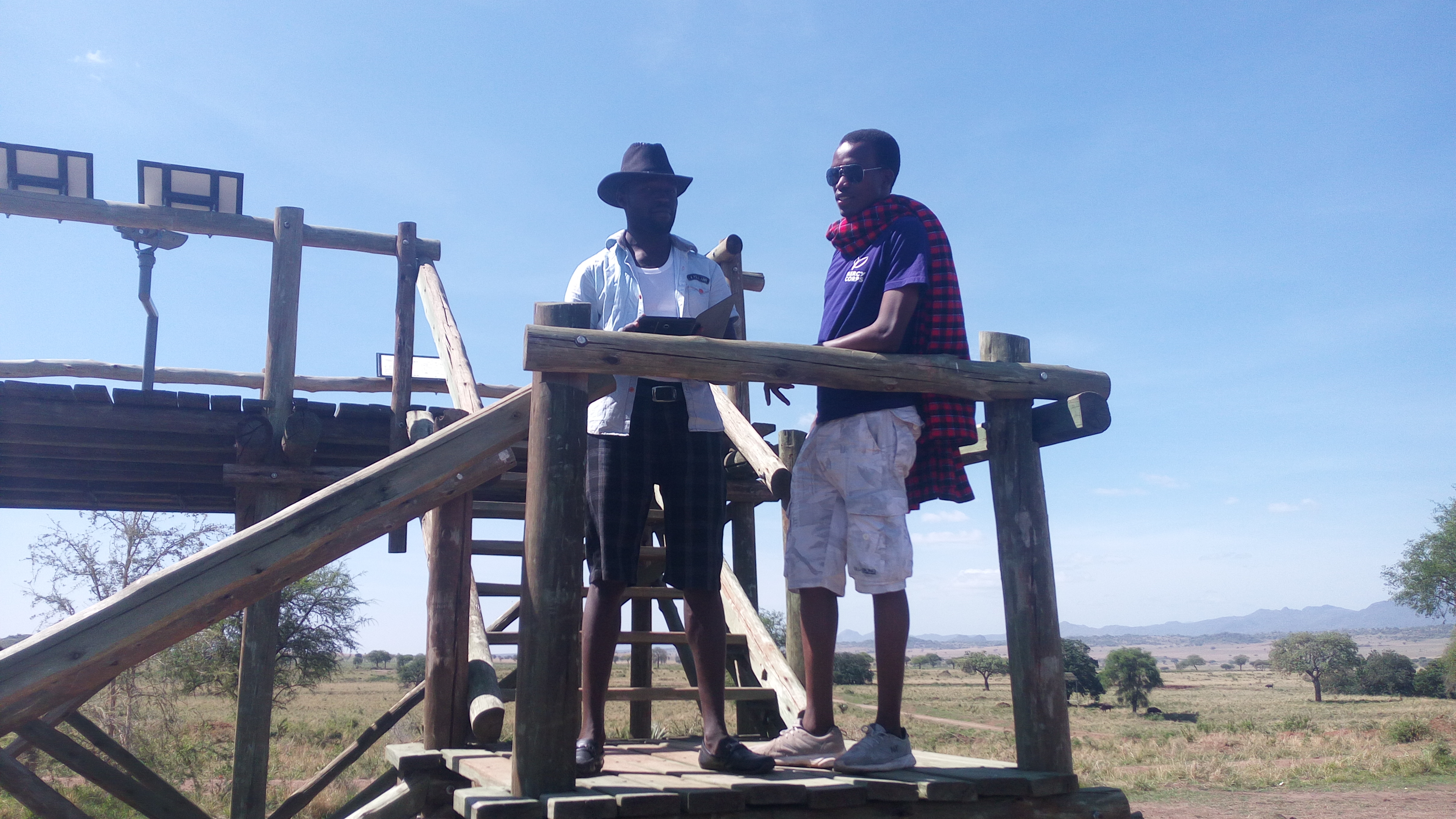
Mercy Corps volunteers on a hide

During the 1960s Kidepo had a sustainable Rothschild giraffe population of over 400 animals. By 1992 this had been poached down to only three animals, including a single female. In 1997 Warden Peter Möller obtained funding from the Frankfurt Zoological Society to translocate giraffes from Kenya's Lake Nakuru National Park. One female died in the holding facility in Lake Nakuru. Two females and one male were flown to Kidepo. In Kidepo one male was eaten by lions shortly after being released.

Fourteen additional giraffes were brought to Kidepo in August 2018, bringing the estimated total population to 48. The animals were brought from Murchison Falls National Park, where oil drilling was expected to threaten wildlife.The reintroduction appeared to be successful, as the population grew to 89 animals by 2022.

==== Kob ====
Hundreds of kob were translocated to Kidepo. More than 100 animals were brought from Murchison in 2017. In 2023 a further 200 were translocated from Kabwoya Wildlife Reserve.

==== Rhinoceros ====
Rhinoceros had existed in the Kidepo area until they were poached to extinction. In the seven years leading up to 1978, the population dwindled from 50 to 16, and the last specimen was seen in 1983. In March 2026 UWA translocated four southern white rhinos from Ziwa Rhino Sanctuary to a boma within Kidepo, with support from Global Conservation, Uganda Conservation Foundation, and other private organizations. Additional animals were expected to be brought to Kidepo, including some from Kenya, where Ziwa's first also originated.
