= Kabwoya Wildlife Reserve =

Protected area in Uganda

- IUCN category III (natural monument or feature)
- Interactive map of Kabwoya Wildlife Reserve
- Coordinates: 1.40462°N 30.96938°E
- Area: 87 square kilometres (34 sq mi)
- Established: 1980

The Kabwoya Wildlife Reserve is a reserve in Uganda. It was established in 1980, and covers 87 square kilometres (34 sq mi).

== Location ==
The reserve is situated within the Western side of the Albertine Rift Valley between the breathtaking Blue Mountains of the Congo and Lake Albert and covers an area of 87 square kilometres. It is characterized by remote Savannah plains along Lake Albert and tourists can enjoy the striking views of Lake Albert and the magnificent Blue mountains of DRC. This Wildlife reserve was gazetted in 1980 and became a wildlife Reserve in 2002.

== History ==
Kabwoya was originally set aside for conservation in 1963 as part of the 227 kilometers Kaiso-Tonya Controlled Hunting Area (KTCHA), which then represented an important component in a migration route along the east shore of Lake Albert between Murchison Falls National Park and the Toro-Semliki Wildlife Reserve. However, the large herds of buffalo, Defassa waterbuck, Ugandan kob and Jackson's hartebeest once associated with the KTCHA had all but vanished when a survey was undertaken there in 1982. Most of these animals were wiped out by poachers during the long years of civil war, while others dispersed elsewhere as a result of competition with cattle herders. At the turn of the millennium, a belated effort to protect the remnant wildlife led to an 87 kilometers portion of KTCHA southwest of the river Hohwa being upgraded in status to form the Kabwoya Wildlife Reserve, while the northeast was rebranded as the Kaiso-Tonya Community Wildlife Area.

== Flora and fauna ==
Wildlife populations in Kabwoya are steadily increasing. The most common large mammals are Ugandan kob, oribi, Anubis baboon and warthog. Jackson's hartebeest, Defassa waterbuck, bushbuck and common duiker are also present in significant numbers. More localized species include hippo, which have recolonized the lake, and the small numbers of giant forest hog, chimpanzee, black-and-white colobus and vervet monkey that dwell in the riparian forest along the rivers Hohwa and Wambabya.
