= Nakasongola District =

- District
- District location in Uganda
- Coordinates: 01°18′N 32°30′E
- Country: Uganda
- Region: Central Region of Uganda
- Established: 1 July 1997
- Capital: Nakasongola

Area
  - Total: 3,737.6 km^{2} (1,443.1 sq mi)
  - Land: 3,511.8 km^{2} (1,355.9 sq mi)
  - Water: 225.8 km^{2} (87.2 sq mi)
- Elevation: 1,160 m (3,810 ft)

Population (2012 Estimate)
  - Total: 156,500
  - Density: 44.6/km^{2} (116/sq mi)
- Time zone: UTC+3 (EAT)
- Website: www.nakasongola.go.ug

Nakasongola District is the northernmost district of the Central Region of Uganda. The town of Nakasongola is the site of the district's administrative headquarters.

== Location ==
Nakasongola District is bordered by Apac District to the north-west, Amolatar District to the north-east, Kayunga District to the east, Luweero District to the south, Nakaseke District to the south-west, and Masindi District to the north-west. Nakasongola, the main municipal, administrative, and commercial center of the district, is approximately 140 kilometres (87 mi), by road, north of Kampala, the capital and largest city of Uganda.

== Overview ==
Nakasongola District was created in 1997. It was previously part of Luweero District. The commission of inquiry into the local government system in 1987 recognized that Nakasongola was too far from the administrative center of Luweero to be administered directly from there. Nakasongola suffered from relative neglect due to the distance from the then district headquarters. This became the basis for the creation of Nakasongola District in 1997. The district covers 4,909 square kilometres (1,895 mi^{2}), of which 4.6% is permanent wetland. The district is composed of three counties, namely:

- Kyabujingo County
- Buruuli County
- Budyebo County

== Population ==
The 1991 national census put the district population at about 100,500. In 2002, the census estimated the population at 127,100 people, of whom 62,312 (49.7 percent) were female and 62,985 (50.3 percent) were male. In 2012, the population of the district was estimated at 156,500.

== See also ==
- Districts of Uganda
