= Great Elephant Census =

African wildlife survey

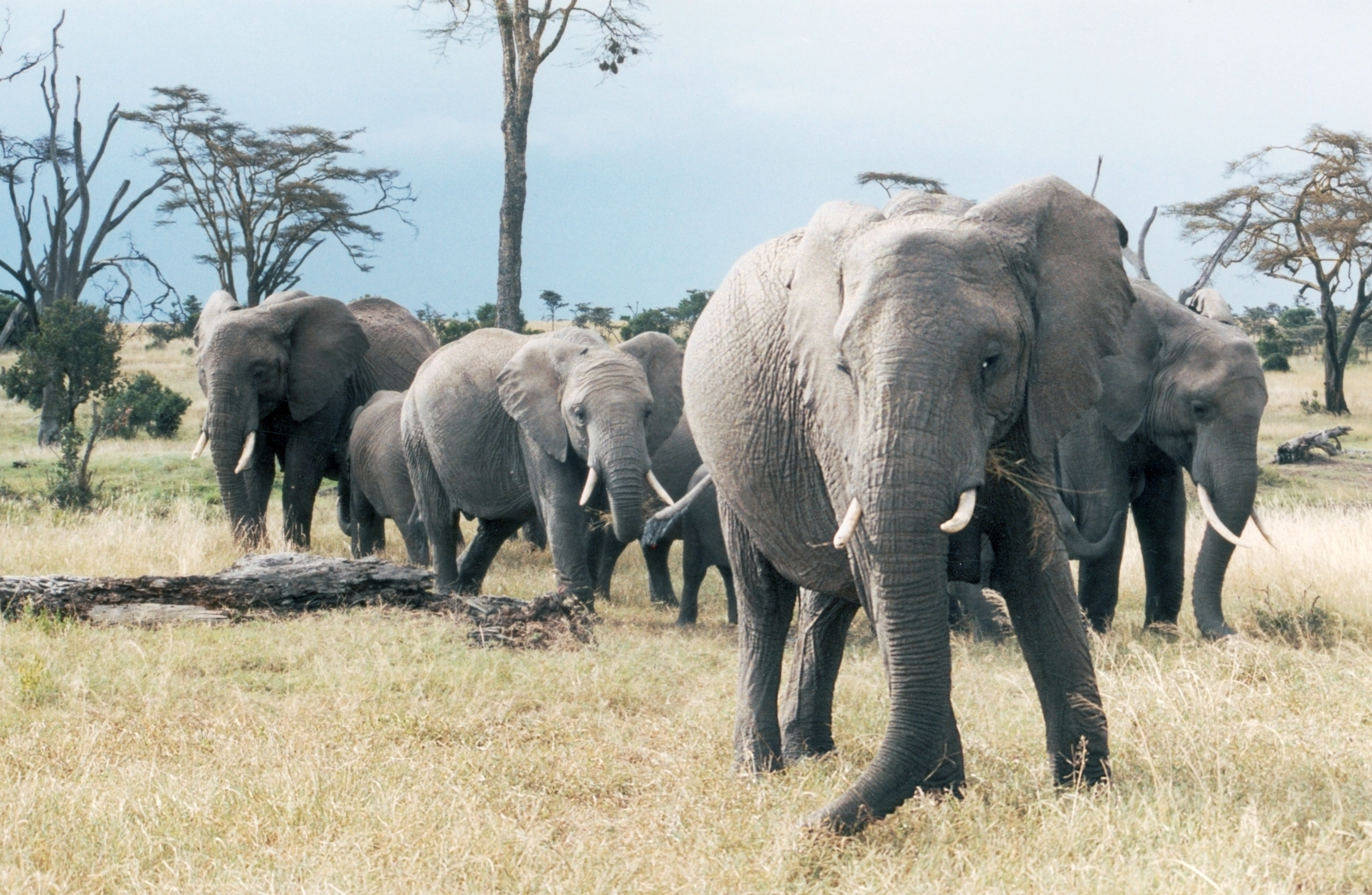
African Elephants in Sweetwater National Parks, Kenya

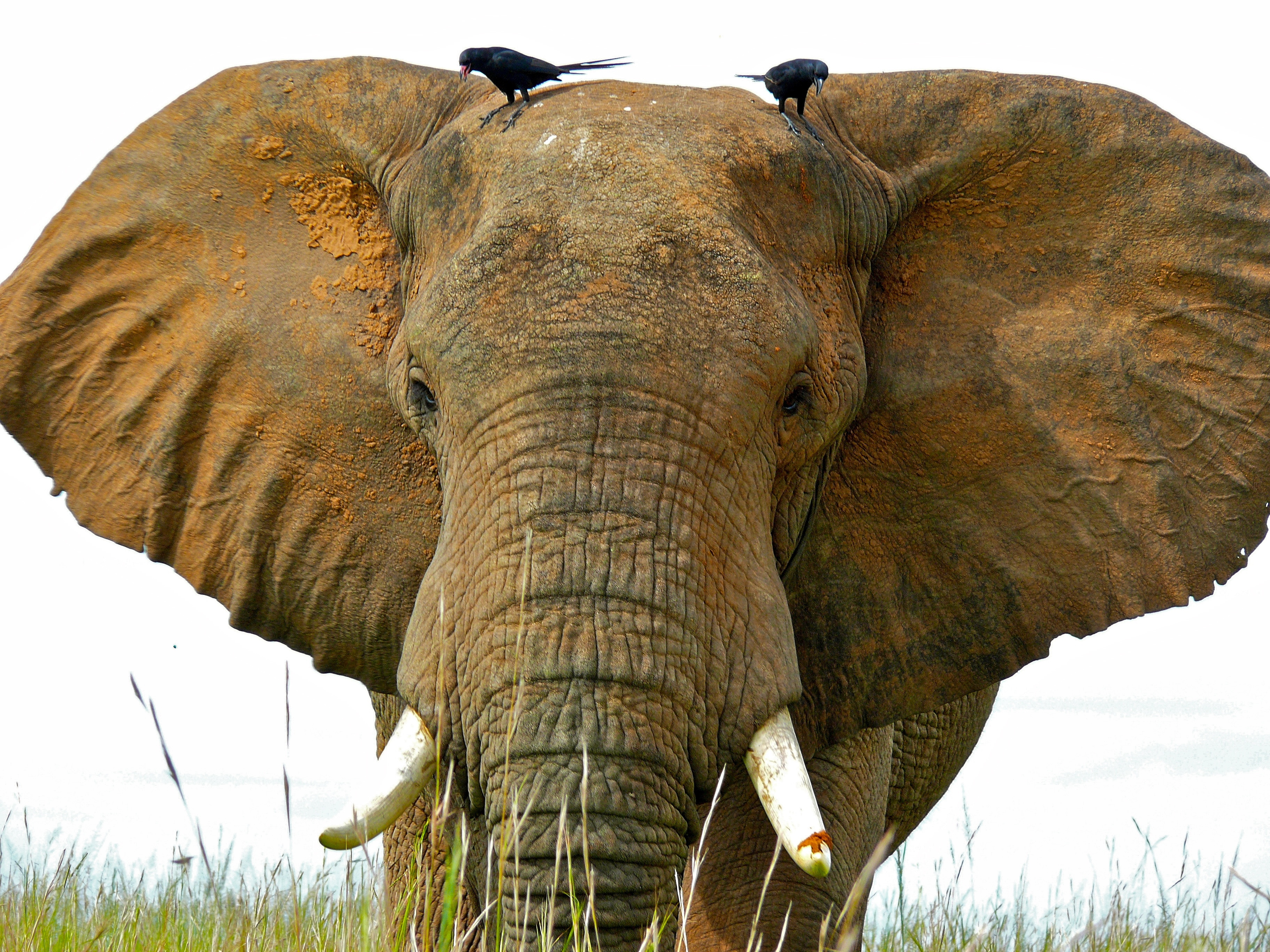
An African savannah elephant

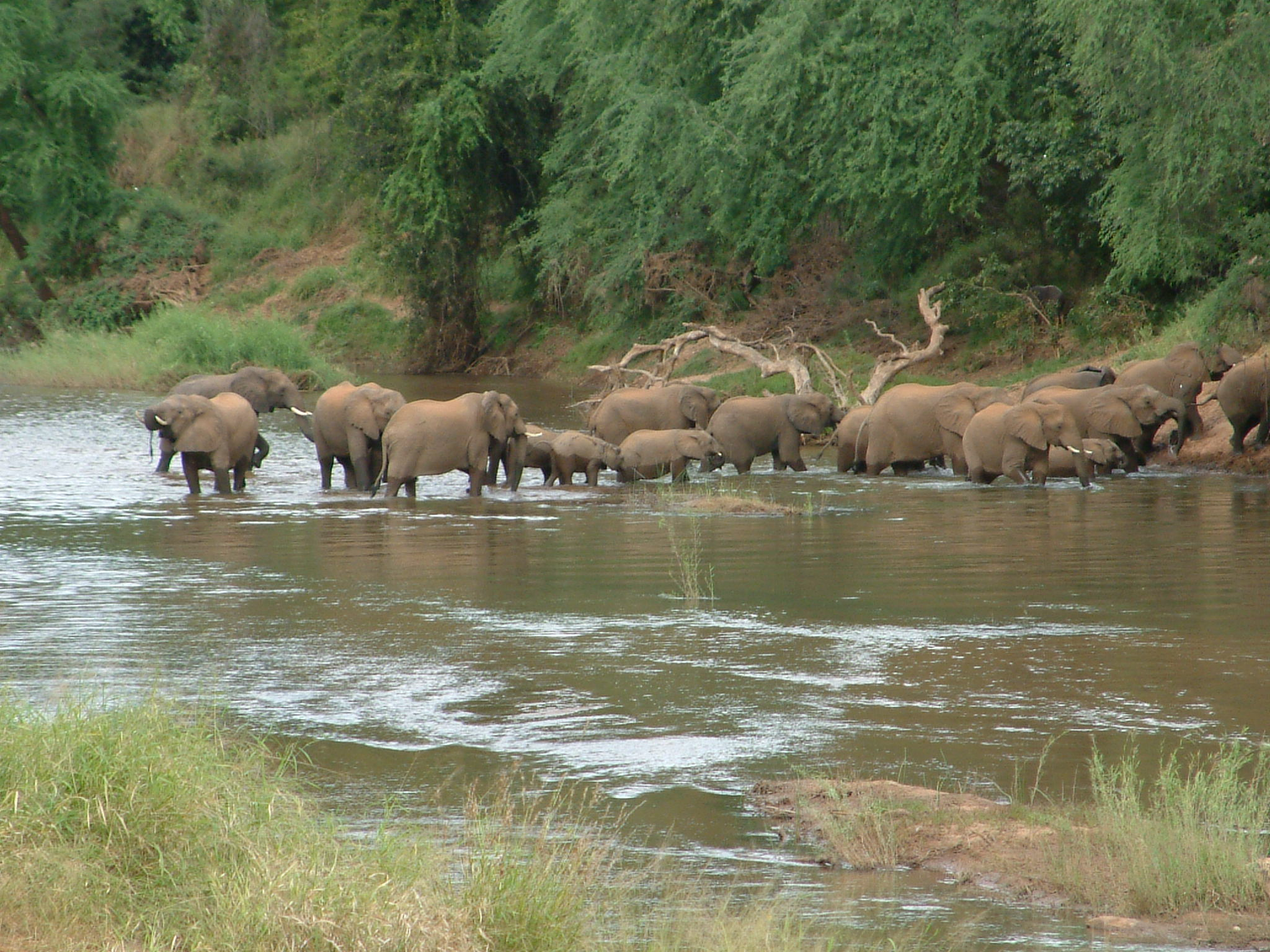
A group of elephants crossing the Luvuvhu river

The Great Elephant Census was an Africa-wide census designed to provide accurate data about the number and distribution of African elephants by using standardized aerial surveys of terrain in Africa. The census was published on the online journal PeerJ on 31 August 2016 at a cost of US$7 million. It's considered the largest wildlife census in history.

== History ==
The scientific community believes that there were as many as 20 million African elephants in the 1800s and at the time of the Scramble for Africa. By 1979, an estimated 600,000 elephants remained on the continent, around a 97% decrease from pre-colonization populations.

At the time, a pan-African elephant census had not been conducted since around 1979. The idea of a modern census was devised by the group Elephants Without Borders and supported, both financially and logistically, by Paul Allen. It was also supported by other organizations and individuals, including African Parks, the Frankfurt Zoological Society, Wildlife Conservation Society, The Nature Conservancy, IUCN African Elephant Specialist Group, Howard Frederick, Mike Norton-Griffith, Kevin Dunham, Chris Touless, and Curtice Griffin (as credited by the final report).

Mike Chase, the founder of Elephants Without Borders, was the lead scientist of the census. Chase led a group of 90 scientists and 286 crew members in 18 African countries for over two years to collect the data. During this time the team flew a distance of over 500,000 kilometres (310,686 mi), equivalent to flying to the moon and a quarter of the way back, in over 10,000 hours of collecting data. The area covered represents 93% of the elephants known range.

Forest Elephants which live in central and western Africa were excluded from the survey.

== Report ==
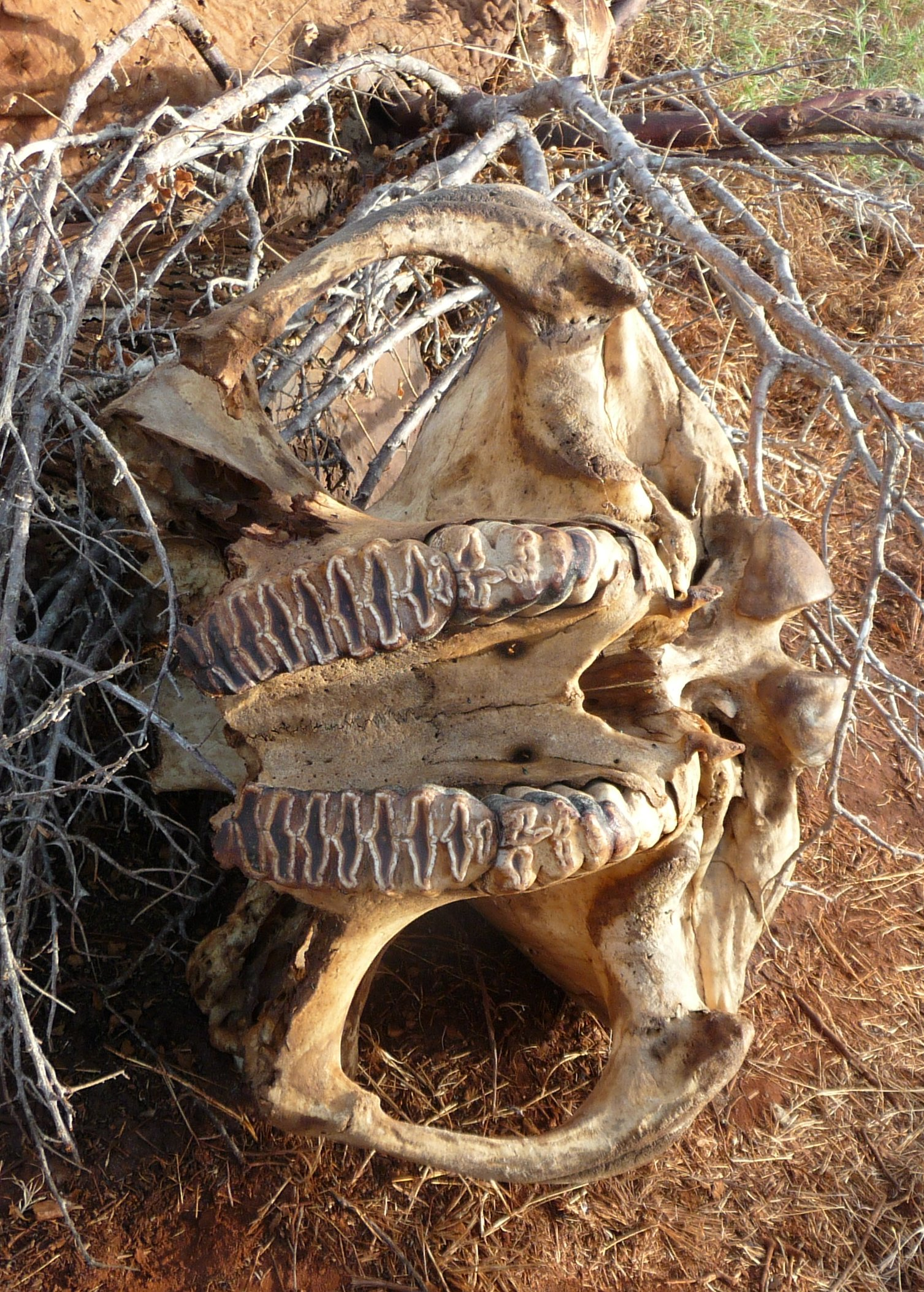
An elephant skull with removed tusks, indicating that it was killed by poachers, Voi area, Kenya

The final report was released on 31 August 2016 in Honolulu at the IUCN World Conservation Congress. Data collected showed a 30 percent decline in the population of African savanna elephant in 15 of the 18 countries surveyed. The reduction occurred between 2007 and 2014, representing a loss of approximately 144,000 elephants.

The total population of Africa's savannah elephants were enumerated as 352,271, far lower than what the surveyors had previously estimated.

Three countries with significant elephant populations were not surveyed; Namibia didn't release any figures and both South Sudan and the Central African Republic were in the middle of an armed conflict.

The rate of decline in the population is also accelerating and reached 8% in 2014. The loss of population is primarily a result of poaching with the elephants being killed for their tusks. The ivory is then illegally sold around the world, such as China and the United States. As a result of the survey, it was estimated that approximately 100 elephants were killed every day for ivory. Losses of the elephant's habitat are another reason for the drastic reduction in population.

84% of the population were sighted in legally protected areas, such as reserves and national parks. Not only that, a high number of carcasses were found in the same protected areas, indicating poaching.
