= Ethnogenesis of the Nandi =

The Nandi people of western Kenya trace their origins to the 17th–18th centuries, when migrating Ateker clans coalesced with various Kalenjin speaking communities, most notably a people recalled as Sirikwa, initially in areas of present day Uasin Gishu and also Kisumu and Nandi counties to form a new polity. According to oral tradition, this formation arose from two principal lineages that encountered a third that was settled in the Kipchoriat [Nyando] Valley.

By the time of the Maina age-set (time unclear), a new identity had started forming and they had begun referring to themselves as Chemwal. By the time of the Sawe (c. mid-19th century), other communities (possibly those from the Swahili coast) had begun referring to this polity by the name Nandi. This would become the name of these peoples.

== Historical and anthropological context ==
Turkana origins: The Turkana belong to the Ateker peoples and formed when a group of Jie separated from the main body at Koten Hill in north-eastern Uganda, an area now referred to as Najie - Jie homeland and descended the escarpment into the Tarash Valley.

Nayece legend: In the legend; long ago a woman came from Najie gathering wild fruits. The woman, called Nayece (or Nayeche) moved eastward arriving at the hill now known as Moru a Nayece, near the Tarash river where she settled. Later, a bull (engiro) got lost in Najie and came to the east following the Tarash river. Young men from Najie tracked the bull and found Nayece and the bull living near Moru a Nayece. They saw that the area was good and thus went back to tell other young men in Najie and they moved to the area and settled there.

Environmental pressures: In the late 1700 or early 1800s a severe drought, recalled as “Aoyate” (long dry time) in Turkana, disrupted life the Rift Valley. Traditions record that during this time the Turkana (now called Turkana but still allied to the Jie) began moving into new pastures.

== Emergence of Apatepes and the diviner-chiefs ==
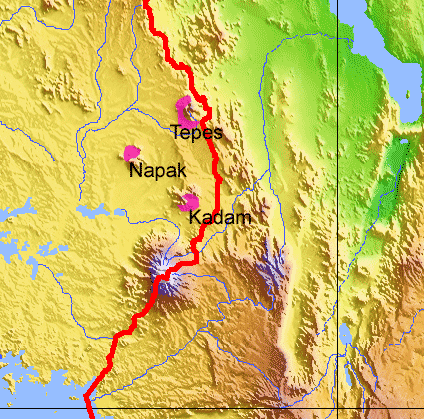
Present Kuliak language distribution

A memorable Turkana tradition recounts the emergence of a leader named Apatepes during the era of the Putiro generation (circa 1800–1850). Apatepes, a member of the Tepes from the Kuliak-speaking peoples, was renowned for possessing miraculous supernatural powers. Not long after the Turkana had taken Moru Assiger from a people they called the "Siger", young men of the Putiro generation once again began to push across the ecological and ethnic frontiers that lay before them.

They encountered a radically different environment from what their ancestors had known when descending the escarpment from Karamoja. To the east, dry and rugged plains gradually sloped down toward the shores of Lake Turkana in the Rift Valley. To the north and south stretched arid expanses with harsher ecological conditions than they had ever experienced. Aside from the brackish waters of the lake, permanent water sources—and even adequate dry-season grazing—were limited to areas along the escarpment's base and scattered highland zones.

This forbidding country was inhabited by a people the Turkana called Kor—“the red people”—and, farther east, by their allies, the Rendille and Borana.

By this time, the Turkana themselves included among their ranks another red people—the Siger. Undeterred, the youth of the Putiro generation advanced eastward, driving the Kor toward the lake’s western shores, in the process pushing their allies to its eastern shores. Having taken possession of the western shores of Lake Turkana, they swung south, seizing control of the vast region between the Turkwel and Kerio valleys.

Von Höhnel (1894) writing following his journey to Lake Turkana, gave the following account of the population movements over the preceding fifty years. As told to him by informants:

The Turkana at present occupy the whole of the district in the immediate west of Lake Rudolf (Turkana), the southern boundary being formed by the middle course of the Trrawell (Turkwel) river...Some fifty years ago the Turkana owned the part of the land on the west now occupied by the Karamoyo (Karimojong), whilst the southern portion of their land belonged to the Burkineji. The Karamoyo drove the Turkana further east, and the Turkana in their turn, pushed the Burkineji towards Samburuland.

== Formation of the Loikop at Woto ==
The movement of the Burkineji to the territory east of Lake Turkana, seems to have led to the emergence of a new polity that called itself Loikop, this polity incorporated an Ateker element that contributed a great deal to military and societal organisation, notably diviner chiefs (a cultural adaptation arising from the interaction with the Kuliak). The Burkineji element likely contributed a number of cultural features, most notably initiation through circumcision.

According to traditions recorded by MacDonald (1899), the Loikop society fragmented as it expanded from a territory located east of Lake Turkana. This led to the development of three groupings within Loikop society. The Sambur who occupied the 'original' country east of Lake Turkana as well as the Laikipia plateau. The Uasin Gishu occupied the grass plateaus of the Uasin Gishu and Mau while the Maasai territory extended from Naivasha to Kilimanjaro.

Woto (sometimes Otto, *Do, To and Do) is a location which Samburu consider to be their homeland. Woto means north in Samburu.

The Nandi have a tradition that the first man who practiced circumcision in Nandi is said to have been one Kipkenyo who came from a country called Do (in other accounts To, indicating the intervocalic Kalenjin *d sound – closest pronunciation Tto). This word is also similar to the word for visitor/stranger, a common term during this period.

The story goes that Kipkenyo had a number of brothers and sisters who all died when they reached puberty, so Kipkenyo decided when he had a number of children of his own to 'change' them all at this age. He therefore circumcised them, and as none of his children died, the Nandi followed his example, with the result that circumcision became general.

— Hollis, A. C., The Nandi - Their Language and Folklore, 1909

The word 'change' in Nandi is wal.

== Turkana memories: Conquest of the Uasin Gishu plateau ==
According to Maasai tradition, the Uasin Gishu front conquered a group of people who occupied the Uasin Gishu plateau, this community is remembered as Senguer. Other Maasai traditions concur with this assertion, noting that the Loosekelai (i.e. Sigerai/Siger) were attacked by an alliance of the Uasin Gishu and Siria communities.

In further concurrence with Maasai traditions, are macro-Kalenjin traditions such as the popular narrative of origin recorded by Chesaina (1991). In it is stated that the Kipsigis, Nandi and Tugen split following a series of misfortunes, notably drought and attacks by the Uasin Gishu Maasai. The Tapkendi tale has also been widely quoted to illustrate past occupation of the Uasin Gishu plateau by the Nandi, specifically, the introduction which reads "At a time when the Masai occupied some of the Nandi grazing grounds". It is presumed that this was the Uasin Gishu plateau and that Nandi place names on the plateau were superseded by Maasai names. This is evinced by certain "Masai place-names in eastern Nandi (i.e., Uasin Gishu border) which indicate that the Masai had temporary possession of strip of Nandi roughly five miles wide", these include Ndalat, Lolkeringeti, Nduele and Ol-lesos, which were by the early nineteenth century in use by the Nandi as koret (district) names.

=== Nandi - Kipsigis division ===
Certain Nandi and Kipsigis traditions suggest that the defeat of the Sengwer on the plateau resulted in numbers of them retreating into the dense forests around the plateau. These traditions appear to be 'Turkana memories' given they emanate from the north and involve conquest of so called 'Masai' living on the plateau, these people are referred to variously as 'Segelai Masai'.

Kipsigis traditions such as those recorded by Orchadson (1927), state that at a time when the Kipsigis and Nandi were a united identity, they moved southwards through country occupied by 'Masai'. Orchadson notes that this was "probably the present Uasin Gishu country". Here, they accidentally got split in two by a wedge of Masai who Orchadson records as being "Uasin Gishu (Masai) living in Kipchoriat (Nyando) valley". Accounts from Hollis also refer to a "branch called 'L-osigella or Segelli [who] took refuge in the Nyando valley but were wiped out by the Nandi and Lumbwa...It was from them that the Nandi obtained their system of rule by medicine-men.

== Sirikwa memories: Reconquest of Uasin Gishu plateau ==
During Kimnyole's reign, internecine conflicts of the 1870s and 80s between the various Maasai factions saw the routing of the Uasin Gishu Maasai by a combined force of the Naivasha and Laikipia Maasai. The Nandi then defeated the remnants of the Uasin Gishu at a battle in the Kipkaren Valley, as the Maasai had tried to re-assert their claim to the plateau.

Shortly after, the Laikipiak were defeated by the Naivasha such that the latter were left as the only military power strong enough to contest the grazing rights to the Uasin Gishu plateau with the rising Nandi.

Several inconclusive skirmishes took place between the two until eventually, the Naivasha were routed at Ziwa and chased back into the Rift Valley. Thus, the Nandi had unchallenged access to the pastures and salt licks throughout the vast Uasin Gishu plateau. Cattle and captives swelled the Nandi animal and human populations.

== Ancestral lineages (Kony, Lumbwa and Keiyo) ==
The Nandi account of the formation of their tribe states that the peoples that coalesced to form the people now called Nandi came:

- From Elgon & Lumbwa

Kipoiis
Kipamwi
Kipkenda
Kipiegen

- From Lo-'sekelae Masai

Kipkoiitim (also partly from Elgon)
Talai, the medicine men's clan (partly also from Kamasya)
Toyoi

- From Elgon

Kipkokos

- From Elgon & Elgeyo

Kipsirgio
Moi
Sokom
Kiptopkei
Kamwaikei

- From Lumbwa

Tungo
Kipaa
Kipasiso and Kapchemuri (Chemuri)
Elgoni (Kony)
