= So (Tepeth) =

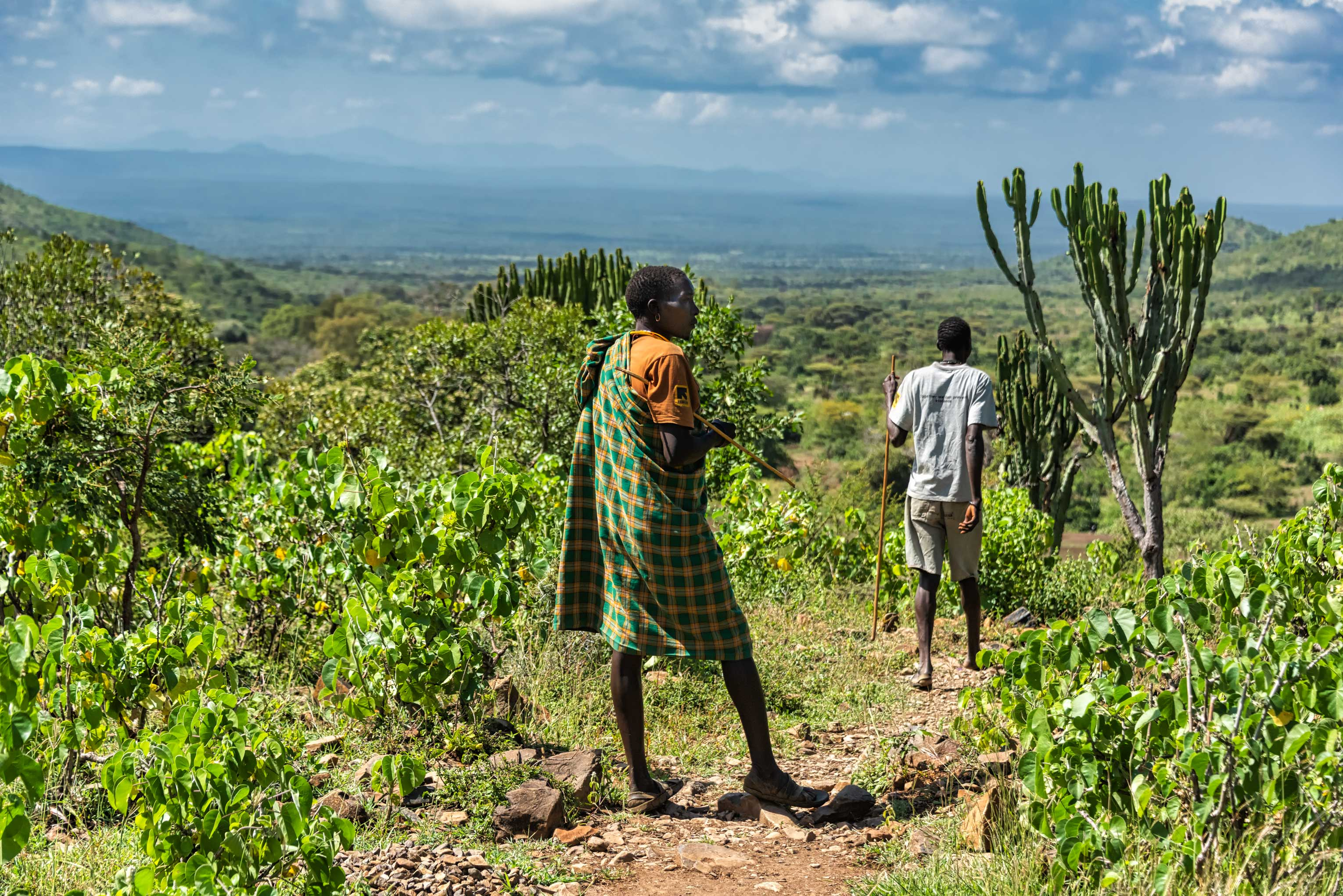
Tepeth Man walking on the Slopes of Mountain Moroto.

So (Tepeth) are a tribe living in the mountain ranges of mountain Moroto in the northeast part of Uganda and North western Kenya in the Turkana region. Traditionally, the So (Tepeth) were hunters and fruit gatherers, the decline in wild animals in the region made them resort to agriculture for sustainable living between 1970 and 1980. Tepeth are believed as original occupants of Karamoja plains unfortunately the current settlers (Karamojong people) pushed the Tepeth up on the mountain.

== Language ==
So (Tepeth) people speak the Soo or So language, which is the Kuliak language of the Tepes people of northeastern Uganda with only a few elderly people being able to speak it. The language is divided into three dialects: Tepes, Kadam (Katam), and Napak (Yog Toŋi).

=== Dialects ===
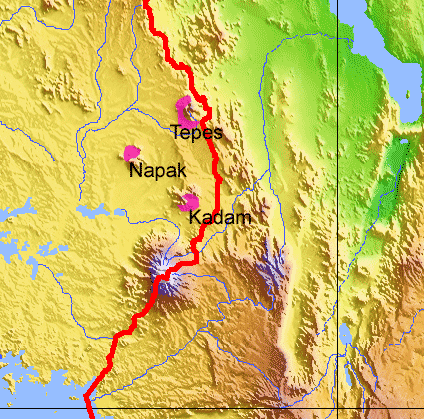
Soo language

Soo dialects are spoken on the slopes of the following three mountains in east-central Uganda just to the north of Mount Elgon.

- Tepes dialect (also called Tepeth), on the slopes of Mount Moroto in Moroto District, Uganda. It is spoken in the Kakingol, Lea, and Tapac valleys on the slopes the Mount Moroto. The dominant language in the area is Karimojong. Most Tepes people have assimilated both linguistically and culturally with the Karimojong people. Villages include Akeme, Nabuin, and Mokora, as well as Naripo Kakole.
- Kadam dialect, on the slopes of Mount Kadam in Nakapiripirit District, Uganda. Villages include Nakapeliethe and Nakaapiripirit. Kadam data is primarily available in Heine (m.s.). The dominant language in the area is Pokot. According to Carlin (1993), Mount Kadam has the highest concentration of ethnic So people.
- Napak dialect, on the slopes of Mount Napak in Napak District, Uganda (no speakers found as of 1993).

There are fewer than 60 elderly speakers of all three dialects combined.

Carlin (1993: 2-3) notes that there are only minor differences between the Tepes and Kadam dialects, which are mutually intelligible.

Kesby (1977) notes that the spread of the Karimojong, Turkana and Maasai in the 18th century resulted in the present widely scattered distribution of the "Tepes", Upale and Ik language speakers but that these were already separated from each other by Nilo-Maa languages before A.D.1000.

== Location ==
The So (Tepeth) tribe live on the mountain ranges of mountain Moroto in the northeast part of Uganda at Latitude 2.5333° N, and Longitude 34.7667° E.

== Population ==
The local leaders of So (Tepeth) are estimated to be over 40,000 both women, children and men however the actual population still remains unclear.

== Culture ==
The So (Tepeth) people are predominantly herdsmen practicing pastoralism on a large scale. They as well engage in subsistence agriculture and plant crops like maize, sorghum, millet, groundnuts, sweet potatoes among other crops. The So (Tepeth) people perform unique cultural dances with the participation of both men and women. The dance involves short vertical jumps without the feet fully leaving the ground.

== See also ==
- Karamojong People
- Ugandan Traditions
- Ugandan Folklore
- Acholi People
- Lango People
