= Sengwer people =

The Sengwer people (also known as Cherang'any and previously as Sekker, Siger, Sigerai, Segelai, Senguer, Senguel and Jangwel) are an indigenous community who primarily live in the Embobut forest in the western highlands of Kenya and in scattered pockets across Trans Nzoia, West Pokot and Elgeyo-Marakwet counties. The Sengwer are sometimes portrayed as a component of the Marakwet people but are a distinct ethnic grouping with a distinct language.

The Sengwer people are currently a marginalized community and face significant threats to their identity and ancestral lands. International and human rights organizations including the United Nations, Amnesty International and the Kenya Human Rights Commission recognize the Sengwer as indigenous peoples whose claim to the area goes back hundreds of years and have repeatedly raised concerns about human rights violations against them.

== Etymology ==
Following his Juba expedition, MacDonald (1899) noted of the 'Senguer' who previously 'dwelt on the Uasin Gishu plateau' stating that "As "l" and "r" are interchangeable, "Senguer" of the Juba expedition is evidently the same word as "Jangwel", a term which Mr. C. Hobley found was applied by the Nandi to designate their tribe".

In recorded accounts of the colonial era in Kenya, the people today known as Sengwer usually referred to themselves as such.

...Once the Cherangany were a powerful race called Sengwer...

— Sengwer chief Arap Kamussein at A.C.Hoey’s farm on 2nd October 1932

Other accounts on the etymology consider the name a derivation from Karimajong. The Karimajong came to refer to them by the name of the cowrie shell ornament that Sengwer women of the 1700s and 1800s adorned themselves with - a dangling cowrie shell referred to as esigirait, pl. ngisigira in Karimojong. They thus came to be known as Siger, Sigerai, Segelai and Losegelai in some accounts.

== Pre-19th century ==
=== Territory ===
At its largest extent, Sengwer territory covered the northern parts of Uasin Gishu, as well as parts of Elgeyo-Marakwet, Trans Nzoia and a southern section of West Pokot;

...Commences from Kiporoom River in Uasin Gishu District. It extends along the Kapsumbeywet River through Ziwa (Sirikwa) centre, Moiben Posta and Kose hills in Uasin Gishu. From Kose Hills, it goes down to join Moiben River. The boundary goes up river Moiben to the confluence of Ko’ngipsebe and Kimowo streams. It turns eastwards to cover areas of Maron sub-location in the Emboput location in Marakwet District. Turning to the west it then goes to Kamolokon along Marakwet/West Pokot and Marakwet boundary. From here it drops to Sebit, Somor, then to Kongelai and up along Swom River. From Swom River to the confluence of Swom and Cheptenden River. From Cheptenden River to the confluence of Cheptenden River and Moiben River where these two rivers confluence with Kiboorom.

— Sengwer chief Arap Kamussein before the Kenya Land Commission on 2 October 1932

=== Way of life ===
The Sengwer prior to the 19th century herded a distinctive type of long-horned black cattle, postulated by Lamphear (1994) as being a cervicothoracic-humped Sanga crossbreed.

During this period, social groupings similar in concept to clans seem to have played a role in the social organisation of the Sengwer. One of these 'clans' was known as the Kacepkai. This clan was displaced during the Turkana invasion of Moru Assiger and were said to have become the diviners of a number of different peoples in the Mt. Elgon region.

The Sengwer are credited with great mystical abilities and divination appears to have played a large role in their culture. The confederacy gave rise to the Meturona line of diviners among the Turkana, the Kachepkai diviners of the Pokot and the Talai diviners of the Uas Nkishu Maasai, the Nandi and Kipsigis.

The most notable element of Sengwer culture was an adornment of a single cowrie shell attached to the forelock of Sengwer women, a hairstyle that was also common to the Oropom who neighbored them to the west and north-west. This dangling cowrie shell was referred to as esigirait, pl. ngisigira and it is from this cultural feature that the Sengwer are said to have derived their name.

== 19th century ==
Towards the end of the 18th century, a drought captured in folklore as the Aoyate - the long dry time, struck. It appears that the factors that resulted in famine combined to decimate Sengwer identity.

The long-horned cattle that the Sengwer kept were devastated by the Aoyate drought. The drought decimated the Sengwer herds and the community disintegrated. Many famine refugees who tried to push eastwards died of starvation near Moru Eris, though some found refuge with the Dassanetch, Pokot and Karimojong.

To the north, Ateker societies, notably the emerging Turkana who lived on the borders of Sengwer territory, began encroaching on Sengwer highland pastures. These societies led a radically different way of life to the Sengwer, a spartanly pastoral world view based on their early possession of hardy thoraic-humped Zebus that were much more resistant to heat stress, drought and disease. The Turkana had bordered the Sengwer for some time and their initial interactions had been peaceful though conflict, likely spurred by the drought, developed towards the end of the 18th century. Large parts of the Sengwer community, already decimated by the drought, were absorbed into the growing Turkana identity, becoming a territorial section known as Siger and probably forming several new Turkana clans, including the Siger, Swalika and Ngoleroto clans.

According to Maasai tradition, the Chemngal were attacked by an alliance of the Uasin Gishu and Siria Loikop communities.

To the east, rivalry was also developing with the Loikop (also known as 'Kor'), a Maa-speaking alliance that lived in close associations with various Cushitic-speaking peoples. Like the Turkana, the Kor kept some of the hardy Zebus which allowed them to withstand the Aoyate a lot better than the Sengwer and to absorb members of the community as their society collapsed.

To the south, some refugees were fleeing Turkana advances, who were raiding south into the Uasin Gishu where they were known as Kakesira, and can be associated with the Losegelai (Siger = Sigerai = Segelai) Maasai of the late 19th and early 20th century.

Small numbers of Sengwer retreated into the forests and into small enclaves among the emerging Marakwet society where they retained elements of their identity. The Maasai coined a derogatory term for the Sengwer after they lost their cattle.

...We were robbed of our cattle by the Karamojong and then the Maasai laughed at us because we had no cattle, and called us Cherangany...

— District Commissioner Elgeiyo/Marakwet, Tambach, Report dated 11 October 1927

== 20th century ==
By the early 20th century,

...the Sengwer (Cherangany) [were] a minority, unrecognized, marginalised, oppressed and discriminated against hunter-gatherer indigenous group...

— Assistant District Commissioner, Marakwet, letter to the Provincial Commissioner, Naivasha on 1 October 1918

== Recent history ==
The Sengwer continues to be a marginalized community that is facing separate and significant threats to both its identity and ancestral lands in the present time.

By 1980, the pressures of population growth of forest dwelling communities in Kenya, among them the Sengwer, came against the governments desire and efforts to control the forests. Repeated eviction attempts have been carried out since then.

On 16 January 2018 herder Robert Kirotich was shot and killed and David Kipkosgei Kiptilkesi was injured by Kenya Forest Service officers. The Sengwer men were herding their cattle at the time. Both were unarmed. As of 17 January 2018, the European Union suspended its financial support for the Kenyan Government's Water Towers Protection and Climate Change Mitigation and Adaptation Programme (WATER), as a result of ongoing abuses of the human rights of indigenous people in the conservation areas.

On 22 January 2018, a court in Eldoret issued an injunction requiring the government to stop the evictions until the Sengwer community's case was heard on 27 February 2018. As of October 2018, the Sengwar were preparing an international petition to be taken to the African Court on Human and Peoples' Rights in Arusha, Tanzania.

Milka Chepkorir as one of the Sengwer People has been documenting all various testimonies about the effect on eviction to the Sengwer People. She said:

Evictions have been affecting children from an early age, making it harder for girls to acquire the education that would help them recognize their legal rights, and develop alternative economic ways to provide for their families. Evictions not only affect Sengwer women, but also affect Sengwer girls, making them susceptible to harsh experiences and exposing them to situations where they are more vulnerable like getting into unions at an early marriage and most often with older men, thereby compromising their childhoods, and rights like education, play, reproductive health

The eviction still happened till 2020 and in the middle of COVID-19 pandemic. Kenyan Forest Service used the reason of protection and conservation of the forests as the reason for doing the evictions. Though, the Sengwer people tells that their tradition has conserved the forest for a long time.
