= Kadam People =

People of Mount Kadam in Karamoja, Uganda

The Kadam people inhabit Mount Kadam in Nakapiripirit District in the Karamoja sub-region, located in north-eastern Uganda.

== History ==
They are closely related to the Tepeth/Tepes or So peoples who inhabit Mount Napak and Mount Moroto, also in southern Karamoja. Some regard them as a sub-group of the Tepeth. There is very little written about them, but local oral history records all these groups as having been the inhabitants of wider areas of present-day Karamoja who took refuge in the mountains when the Karamojong arrived from Ethiopia in the 17th century (see Karamojong people). They are one of the few peoples in Uganda to practise Female Genital Mutilation

== Language ==
The Kadam speak the Kadam Language, also known as yog toŋi which is a variant of the So language of the Nilo-Saharan languages group. It is also closely related to the languages of the peoples mentioned above. The language is endangered; those who speak Kadam/So as a first language are middle-aged and elderly, the younger generations speak mostly the Pökoot or Karamojong language.
