= Oropom =

Oropom may refer to:

- the Oropom people
- the Oropom language
