= Chemwal people =

The Chemwal (also Chemwel, Il-Tengwal, Jangwel, Senguel, Senguer) people were a Kalenjin-speaking society that inhabited regions of western and north-western Kenya as well as the regions around Mount Elgon at various times through to the late 19th century. The Nandi word Sekker (cowrie shell) was used by Pokot elders to describe one section of a community that occupied the Elgeyo escarpment and whose territory stretched across the Uasin Gishu plateau. This section of the community appears to have neighbored the Karamojong who referred to them as Siger, a name that derived from the Karimojong word esigirait (cowrie shell). The most notable element of Sekker/Chemwal culture appears to have been a dangling adornment of a single cowrie shell attached to the forelock of Sekker women, at least as of the late 1700s and early 1800s.

== Etymology ==
Hollis (1905) noted that up till the mid-19th century, the Nandi referred to themselves as Chemwalindet (pl.Chemwalin) or Chemwal (pl. Chemwalek) while other Kalenjin speaking communities referred to the Nandi as Chemngal. However, Huntingford (1927) stated that his subsequent understanding was that the Nandi were known as Chemwal and that their country was known as Chemngal. Huntingford noted that at that time, the Nandi were still referred to as Chemwel by the 'Suk' and as il-Tengwal by the Maasai.

Following his Juba expedition, MacDonald (1899) noted of the 'Senguer' who previously 'dwelt on the Guash Ngishu plateau' stating that "As "l" and "r" are interchangeable, "Senguer" of the Juba expedition is evidently the same word as "Jangwel", a term which Mr. C. Hobley found was applied by the Nandi to designate their tribe".

== Territory & neighbors ==
At its largest extent, Chemngal covered the northern parts of Uasin Gishu, as well as parts of Elgeyo-Marakwet, Trans Nzoia and a southern section of West Pokot;

...Commences from Kiporoom River in Uasin Gishu District. It extends along Kapsumbeywet river through Ziwa (Sirikwa) centre, Moiben Posta and Kose hills in Uasin Gishu. From Kose hills it goes down to join Moiben river. The boundary goes up river Moiben to the confluence of Ko’ngipsebe and Kimowo streams. It turns eastwards to cover areas of Maron sub-location in Emboput location in Marakwet District. Turning to the west it then goes to Kamolokon along Marakwet/West Pokot and Marakwet boundary. From here it drops to Sebit, Somor, then to Kongelai and up along Swom river. From Swom river to the confluence of Swom and Cheptenden river. From Cheptenden river to the confluence of Cheptenden river and Moiben river where these two rivers confluence with Kiboorom.

— Sengwer chief Arap Kamussein before the Kenya Land Commission on 2nd October 1932

=== Chok ===
Pokot traditions recorded by Beech (1911) point to a close association between the Sekker and the Chok community who occupied the Elgeyo escarpment that runs along the edge of the Uasin Gishu plateau. It is presently unclear whether the term Chemwal applied to both communities. He notes that the elders of Pokot at the turn of the 19th century averred that;

there always were two original Suk tribes living on the Elgeyo escarpment. The names of these two tribes were Chok or Chuk which is the name for a short sword like implement, and Sekker which means 'cowrie shells'

— The Suk -Their Language and Folklore, Beech, M., 1911

== Economy ==
=== Pastoralism ===
The Siger of Turkana tradition herded a distinctive type of long-horned black cattle that Lamphear postulates was the Sanga breed.

== Way of life ==
Oreet - social groupings similar in concept to clans seem to have played a role in the social organisation of the Chemwal. One of these 'clans' was known as the Kacepkai. This clan was displaced during the Turkana invasion of Moru Assiger and were said to have become the diviners of a number of different peoples in the Mt. Elgon region.

== History ==
Towards the end of the 18th century, a drought captured in folklore as the Aoyate - the long dry time, struck. It appears that the factors that resulted in famine combined to decimate Sengwer identity.

=== 1836 societal collapse ===
According to Turkana traditions recorded by Lamphear, the Chemwal identity was annihilated by a variety of factors related to the Aoyate drought. This famine seems analogous to one referred to by Krapf (1860) when he makes mention of a 'great famine of 1836'. He notes that Turkana traditions state that,

...there was a massive drought which afflicted much of the Rift Valley region. The Siger community was decimated and began to collapse. Some abandoned their mountain and fled eastwards, but ran into even drier conditions. [It] became dry and there was great hunger. The Siger went away to the east to Moru Eris, where most of them died of heat and starvation. So many died that there is still a place there called Kabosan ["the rotten place"]. Bands of Turkan fighting men forced other Siger northwards to the head of Lake Turkana where they formed the Inkabelo section of the developing Dasenech (also Merille) community. Still others were pushed back onto the Suk Hills to the south to be incorporated by the...Pokot as the ritually important Kacepkai clan. Many were assimilated by the Turkana where some became a new clan known simply as 'Siger', and the victors took possession of the grazing and water resources of Moru Assiger.

— Lamphear, 1988

== Karamojong - Chemwal conflict ==
Lamphear's account of the conflict between the Turkana and Siger bear close similarity to Wilson's account of conflict between the Turkana and Maliri community. According to traditions recorded by Wilson (1970), the Jie advanced eastward and entered the present Karimoja territory at Adilang, an area that was at this time occupied by the Maliri. The nature of contact seems to have been hostile for the Maliri retreated eastwards toward the region of Koten Mountain where they stayed for a while. This state of affairs did not hold for long, for the people from the hill of Turkan, now calling themselves Turkana, broke away from the Jie at Kotido and started advancing eastward. This brought extreme pressure to bear on the Maliri at Koten, causing this group to break in two.

One group of Maliri, still known as such to the Karamojong but as Merille elsewhere, moved further eastward settling on the east of the Turkana escarpment. The other group, calling themselves Pokotozek moved south and arrived at Nakiloro, which lies on the Turkana escarpment just north of the Moroto mountain, where they stayed for a short while before moving further south, proceeding down the eastern side of the Chemorongit and Cherangani mountains before finally branching off in the direction of Lake Baringo.

Both these traditions also bear similarity to a narrative that Emley recorded regarding Turkana expansion. He states that.

...the (Turkana) migration to the Turkwell was carried out by two forces-the Nithir and Ngamatak-but, on reaching this river, they realized the necessity for further division to enable one section to protect the country already conquered; and they decided that the Ngamatak should be split up in two separate sections, the one retaining the original name, the other becoming the Nibelai. As a result of this division...the Nithir, under Luguyin, (worked) eastwards, and the Nibelai, under two leaders, Nakoritha and Loliokoli, (worked) southwards

— E.D, Emley, 1927

In a later section he states "the Nithir, whose name is derived from ithiger (an ornament), are so called on account of their love for decoration. The Nithir adakari in Turkana lies north of Nibelai adakari. The Nibelai name is said to derive from tobil (to break) and ebelai (a curved fighting-stick), and that they were so named because they forged their way ahead, returning time and again with broken fighting sticks."

== South I: Chemwal - Pokot interaction ==
Lamphear's account appears to indicate some form of interaction with the Pokot, leading to the rise of the Kacepkai diviners. His account implies pressure but does not seem to suggest a conflict. His account are congruent with Pokot traditions recorded by Beech (1911) give an overall image of a community he refers to as pastoral Suk who appear to have assimilated a community, or at least part of a community known as Chok (Chuk or Suk) that previously occupied the Elgeyo escarpment.

== South II: Chemwal - Siger assimilation ==
According to Maasai tradition, the Uasin Gishu front conquered a group of people who occupied the Uasin Gishu plateau, this community is remembered as Senguer. Other Maasai traditions concur with this assertion, noting that the Loosekelai (i.e Sigerai/Siger) were attacked by an alliance of the Uasin Gishu and Siria communities.

In further concurrence with Maasai traditions, are macro-Kalenjin traditions such as the popular narrative of origin recorded by Chesaina (1991). In it is stated that the Kipsigis, Nandi and Tugen split following a series of misfortunes, notably drought and attacks by the Uasin Gishu Maasai. The Tapkendi tale has also been widely quoted to illustrate past occupation of the Uasin Gishu plateau by the Nandi, specifically, the introduction which reads "At a time when the Masai occupied some of the Nandi grazing grounds". It is presumed that this was the Uasin Gishu plateau and that Nandi place names on the plateau were superseded by Maasai names. This is evinced by certain "Masai place-names in eastern Nandi (i.e Uasin Gishu border) which indicate that the Masai had temporary possession of strip of Nandi roughly five miles wide", these include Ndalat, Lolkeringeti, Nduele and Ol-lesos, which were by the early nineteenth century in use by the Nandi as koret (district) names.

However, micro-Kalenjin traditions would appear to turn this narrative on its head. They concur on key points, notably an incoming population and an enfeebled population (in some cases known as Segelai) holding out in what were then dense forests around the plateau. The key difference is that the Kalenjin communities as seen as the incomers.

Kipsigis traditions such as those recorded by Orchadson (1927), state that at a time when the Kipsigis and Nandi were a united identity, they moved southwards through country occupied by 'Masai'. Orchadson notes that this was "probably the present Uasin Gishu country". Here, they accidentally got split in two by a wedge of Masai who Orchadson records as being "Uasin Gishu (Masai) living in Kipchoriat (Nyando) valley". Accounts from Hollis however refer to a "branch called 'L-osigella or Segelli [who] took refuge in the Nyando valley but were wiped out by the Nandi and Lumbwa...It was from them that the Nandi obtained their system of rule by medicine-men."

The totality of both narratives are however in congruence with the large scale movement of pastoralists from the plains into the forested areas, assimilation of forest-dwelling communities and wide-spread identity shift. A widespread trend across the region as the mutai of the 1830s dragged on.

=== Loss of Uasin Gishu and Mau ===
According to Kalenjin and Maasai traditions, the territory of the Uasin Gishu people extended over the Uasin Gishu and Mau plateaus following the conquest of these regions from the Sengwer i.e Chemwal. This appears to be confirmed by various records from the colonial era.

...We were robbed of our cattle by the Karamojong and then the Maasai laughed at us because we had no cattle, and called us Cherangany...

— District Commissioner Elgeiyo/Marakwet, Tambach, Report dated 11 October 1927

== Nandi identity ==
By the middle of the 19th century, the Nandi eponym was in common use, thus the age-sets of the late 19th century would have identified as Nandi.

Ipinda	Nickname	Years active	Notes
Chumo	-	1870 - 1877	were between 50 and 60 in 1905
Sawe	-	1877 - 1885	were between 42 and 52 in 1905
Kipkoiimet	-	1885 -1892	were between 34 and 44 in 1905
Kaplelach	-	1892 -1900	were between 26 and 36 in 1905
