= Oropom people =

Ethnic group

The Oropom were a people historically reported to have inhabited a wide region spanning northeastern Uganda and northwestern Kenya, including Karamoja, the Mount Elgon area, and parts of West Pokot, Trans-Nzoia, and Turkana counties. According to traditions recorded by J.G. Wilson in the mid-20th century, their territory once extended from Lake Baringo in the east to Lake Turkana in the west, and as far north as parts of present-day South Sudan.

Knowledge of the Oropom is based entirely on Wilson’s fieldwork, which included limited linguistic documentation and oral accounts gathered from elderly informants. While their distinct identity and language remain subjects of scholarly skepticism, the Oropom, if they existed, are believed to have been gradually assimilated into surrounding communities such as the Karamojong, Iteso, Pokot, Turkana, and Bukusu.

== Origins ==
According to Webster, the Oropom nursery was located near Mt. Moroto, from which they moved west to the plain between Napak and Mount Elgon.

Oropom traditions recorded by Wilson capture the extent of their ancient territories: the whole Turkana to a point east of Lake Turkana which the Oropom called "Malimalte", the Cherangani Hills eastward to Lake Baringo, much of the Trans-Nzoia District - all in present-day Kenya; Mt. Elgon and all of Teso sub-region in Uganda; as well as the areas of Didinga and Topossa in Sudan.

== Assimilation ==
It is currently assumed that the Oropom were the original inhabitants of their territory, and that successive waves of migrants invaded the territory;

Wilson suggests that the first invaders of the Oropom territory were proto-Kalenjin speakers who may have included the Nyangea, Teuso and Tepes. They were followed by the Maliri who had occupied with certainty what are now Jie country and large parts of Dodoth country in Uganda. It is estimated that their arrival in those districts occurred 600 to 800 years ago (i.e. c.1200 to 1400 AD). The oropom were assimilated into various Karimojong groups as clans (Aspects of Karimojong ethnography- Fr. Noveli).

== Society ==
=== Appearance ===
Wilson (1970) noted that some individuals living among the Karimojong and who claimed Oropom ancestry could be distinguished by their reddish brown skin, "peppercorn hair", slanted eyes, and prominent cheekbones. On this basis he ascribed them to the Khoisan group.

In 1970, their main mark was a custom of wearing a single cowrie shell attached to a forelock placed over the centre of the forehead (for women), or an indented mark in the centre of the forehead (for men.)

=== Housing ===
Traditions also captured by Wilson note that the Oropom had well-built houses of three to four rooms (unlike the Karamojong), big gardens, and long-horned cattle. They also had a reputation as good potters, and pottery attributed to them is found all over the area.

=== Clothing ===
The women wore skin clothing and large earrings, and did not plait their hair; the men wore nothing but a belt covering their penis, and had long pigtails. Both sexes wore many bangles, and covered themselves in a red oil-ochre mixture.

=== Industry ===
Wilson postulates that they had no knowledge of iron working as most of their tools and implements were Stone Age.

=== Religion and customs ===
Their religious rites are said to have invariably taken place at sunrise, usually on rock outcrops. Some involved animal sacrifices. Some were reserved for elders, while others were open to all. Ritual feasts were held at stone circles. Most accounts of the Oropom state that they did not practice circumcision as a rite of initiation.

== Pokotozek - Oropom conflict ==
Tradition indicates that the Karamojong ancestral territory was northeastern part of Uganda. From here, movements in a southern direction then east and finally northwards brought them to present Matheniko, located south of what was then Maliri territory. These movements appear to have displaced some Oropom whose territory then stretched into these areas, however traditions suggest that the Oropom were at this time numerically superior and peaceful relations generally prevailed.

While at Matheniko, the people now known as Dodoth separated from the rest of the Karamojong. They moved north to the vicinity of Loyoro which was on the fringe of Maliri held territory and here established themselves. Tradition relates that the encounter was peaceful and this appears to be borne out by relations between these communities in later times when they had by then moved away from each other.

Oral traditions indicate that the expansion of Lwoo speakers into Acholi caused the breakaway of a group who were initially known as Jie. The Jie came from the vicinity of Gulu though there was a section of the group who came from a hill known as Got Turkan. The Jie who are said to have been Luo speaking though governed by elders and not chiefs (indicating that their culture was not fully Lwoo-ised), advanced eastward and entered the present Karamoja boundary at Adilang. The territory they entered was then occupied by the Maliri who were pushed to the vicinity of Koten mountains.

The Jie from Got Turkan, now calling themselves Turkana, broke away from the main Jie populace at Kotido and advanced eastward bringing extreme pressure to bear on the Maliri at Koten causing that group to split into two. One section came to be known as Merille while the other referred to themselves as Pokotozek.

The Pokotozek whose movements would have greatest impact on the Oropom, moved south, arriving at Nakiloro which lies on the lip of the Turkana escarpment just north of Moroto mountain, where they stayed for a short while before moving further south, proceeding down the eastern side of the Chemorongit and Cherangani mountains before finally branching off in the direction of Lake Baringo.

This incursion disturbed Oropom who were settled around Baringo, causing a break-up of that group which led to migrations in various directions;

=== Turkwell ===
Some Oropom moved towards the Turkwell, both below and above Turkwell gorge.

=== Uasin Gishu ===
Other Oropom moved into Uasin Gishu Maasai held territory. According to Maasai tradition, an alliance of the Uasin Gishu and Siria communities attacked the Chemngal who then occupied the Plateau today known as Uasin Gishu.

A Karamojong informant noted in 1916 that Nandi occupied territory previously stretched as far north as the sources of the Nzoia River i.e. Mt. Elgon, a territory that had been occupied by the Nandi as lately as the time of the grandfathers of that generation (i.e early to mid-19th century).

The Karamojong raided the northern Nandi sections twice before the Nandi launched a big raid against them at Choo hill near the junction of Kanyangareng & Turkwel rivers. The Masinko clan of Karamojong who were pasturing here counterattacked and successfully drove of the Nandi raiders.

In response to the Nandi raid, the Karimojong organized a powerful force to break up the Nandi nearest the Turkwel-Nzoia watershed but the expedition returned and reported that the Nandi had withdrawn too far south. The Karamojong were unmolested by the Nandi from that time and the Turkwel-Nzoia watershed became a no-mans land.

=== Chemorongit ===
Yet others moved to the Chemorongit mountains (Karasuk) which were still part of Oropom territory, as well as the area west of there and south of Moroto mountain.

The Pokotozek finding that they were no longer facing a formidable tribal grouping to the north and west of Baringo, themselves expanded in that direction, expelling other Oropom from the Cherangani mountains and further west right up to the slopes of Mt Elgon hence limiting Turkana southern movement.

It is notable that the emerging Sebei referred to the Mt Elgon Oropom as Sirikwa. The Sirikwa population at Mt Elgon, as evidenced by Sirkwa holes, was fairly dense and it is likely that their identity was still largely intact. It would take the Karimojong dispersion of the Oropom at Kapcheliba in the early 18th century to finally submerge the Oropom-Sirikwa identity.

== The Battle at Kacheliba ==
A notable battle that occurred around 1825 or 1830 near Kacheliba is largely perceived to have signaled the snuffing out of Oropom identity. A notable element of the battle is the Oropom tying themselves together with leather ropes. Oropom descendants romanticise the encounter, noting that;

The Karimajong kept beating the Oropom and drove them further and further south. Finally the Oropom became tired of running. They began killing their cattle to make leather ropes out of their skins. They tied themselves together with those ropes so that none could run away. They said ‘we are tired of running – it is better that we should all die here together’

The Karimajong on the other hand provide a brutal military assessment of the encounter and the state of Oropom society at that point, they note that;

"...Their shields were larger than ours but were ineffective as they were made of cowhide. Their spears were unlike ours, more like those of the Nandi. When we were strong enough we desired their cattle which had long horns, and we fought a great battle with them. However they were cowards and their elders had to force the young men to fight us; in doing this, they gathered them together in long lines, securing them one to the other by ropes, to prevent them running away. This was very foolish as when we killed one or two of them, the whole line collapsed with the weight of their bodies and we slaughtered them where they fell."

Some then fled east or south; a few Oropom settlements are claimed to have remained between Kacheliba and Karta as late as 1927. Some areas were unaffected by this battle, and Oropom remained between Lolachat and Namalu in Pian county in Nakapiripirit District, and in the area between Mt. Elgon and Mt. Kadam. Traditions of the Didinga people of South Sudan apparently record displacing a "red" people, called the Argit, who were skilled in pottery-making.

== Diaspora ==
=== Iteso ===
Iteso clan names reveal a history of long-standing ethnic interactions and found amongst these are names of Bantu and Northern Nilotic origin. Some of these are clan names are said to be of Iworopom origin. Traditions recorded among the JoPadhola in Kenya indicate that there were two waves of Iteso settlement in their present lands. The first was family based and was peaceful. This was followed by an extensive and aggressive migration that left the Iteso in control of a large swathe of territory that by 1850 extended as far as the western highlands of Kenya.

A story collected by Turpin (1948) suggests that the Iteso are largely descended from the Oropom, a suggestion that has been advanced by many other historians. Karp notes that the Karamoja call the Southern Iteso "Iworopom".

=== Karimajong, Turkana & Tepes ===
Some Oropom fled northwards to join the Turkana and Tepes. People considering themselves Oropom were (as of 1970), according to Wilson, particularly concentrated within the Karamoja area in Matheniko and Jie counties, and to a lesser extent in Bokora; some were also found among the Tepes people of Mt. Moroto and Mt. Kadam. Others were found in Pian county, notably at Lorengedwat.

=== Bukusu ===
Other refugees swelled the Bukusu population where they led a distinctly different way of life within recorded memory.

=== Uasin Gishu Maasai ===
Some Oropom refugees fled eastward and found safe haven on the Uasin Gishu plateau where they have been strongly identified with the Uas Nkishu Maasai.

=== Pokot ===
Some refugees joined the Pokot.

== Bibliography ==
- C. A. Turpin. "The occupation of the Turkwell river area by the Karamojong tribe". The Uganda Journal, vol. 12, no. 2, 1948, pp. 161–165.
- A. C. A. Wright, "Notes on the Iteso social organisation", The Uganda Journal, vol. 9, no. 2, 1942, p. 60.
- J. C. D. Lawrence, "A history of the Teso to 1937", The Uganda Journal, vol. 19, no. 1, 1955.
- J. C. D. Lawrence, The Iteso, London, 1957, pp. 8 & 10.
- "Notes on the Geography of Ethnicity in Uganda", B. W. Langlands, Occ. Paper No. 62, Dept. of Geography, Makerere University, Uganda 1975.
