= Lorengecora =

- Map of Uganda showing the location of Lorengecora.
- Coordinates: 02°14′04″N 34°15′57″E
- Country: Uganda
- District: Napak District
- Elevation: 1,162 m (3,812 ft)
- Time zone: UTC+3 (EAT)

Lorengecora is a settlement in the Northern Region of Uganda. It is the headquarters of Lorengecora Parish, in Iriri sub-county, in Bokora County, in Napak District, in the Karamoja sub-region.

== Location ==
Lorengecora Town Council is located along the Soroti–Katakwi–Moroto–Lokitanyala Road, approximately 111 kilometres (69 mi), by road, northeast of Soroti. The town is about 62 kilometres (39 mi), by road, southwest of Moroto Town, the largest town in the Karamoja sub-region. This location is within the Bokora Corridor Wildlife Reserve, approximately 400 kilometres (249 mi), by road, northeast of Kampala, the largest city and capital of Uganda. The geographical coordinates of Lorengecora Town Council are 02°14'04.0"N, 34°15'57.0"E (Latitude:2.234444; Longitude:34.265833). Lorengecora is situated at an average elevation of 1,162 metres (3,812 ft), above sea level.

== Overview ==
Lorengecora Town Council was created, effective 14 July 2011. In 2015, a study carried out by a non-government organisation, called African Network for the Prevention and Protection against Child Abuse and Neglect (ANPPCAN), on the streets of Kampala, found that 57 percent of all Kampala street children come from the Karamoja sub-region. Also, 44 percent of the same cohort, come from Napak District.

Efforts to resettle the nomadic children back in their home area, have focused in Lorengecora Town Council, where attempts are made to enroll in school and house the returnees at Kobulin Resettlement Camp in Napak District.

== See also ==
- Karamoja
- Bokora Corridor Wildlife Reserve
