= Moroto–Nakapiripirit Road =

Road in Northern Region of Uganda

Coordinates: 02°20′48″N 34°35′27″E

Route information
- Length: 58 mi (93 km)
- History: Designated in 2013; Expected completion in 2016

Major junctions
- North end: Moroto
- South end: Nakapiripirit

Location
- Country: Uganda

Highway system
- Roads in Uganda

Moroto–Nakapiripirit Road is a road in the Northern Region of Uganda. The road connects the towns of Moroto, the largest town in the Karamoja sub-region, and Nakapiripirit in the same sub-region.

== Location ==
The road starts at Moroto and continues south through Lorengedwat, ending in Nakapiripirit, a distance of approximately 98 kilometres (61 mi). Nakapiripirit lies on the way to Mbale, the nearest large town, approximately 161 kilometres (100 mi) south of Nakapiripirit.

== Upgrading to bitumen ==
Beginning with the 2011/2012 national budget, road became one of those planned to be upgraded from gravel to bituminous surface. With political pressure from the Karamoja parliamentary caucus, the road was prioritized in the 2013/2014 financial year. On 12 November 2013, President Yoweri Museveni commissioned the start of construction. The China Road and Bridge Construction Corporation, a subsidiary of the China Communications Construction Company, was awarded the contract for the 93.3 kilometres (58 mi) road at a cost of US$80 million (USh:184 billion at that time), fully funded by the Ugandan government. The road is expected to be ready during the first half of 2016.

== See also ==
- Moroto District
- Nakapiripirit District
- Economy of Uganda
- List of roads in Uganda
