= Ethnogenesis of the Turkana =

The Turkana of northwestern Kenya trace their origins to the 17th–18th centuries, when migrating Ateker clans coalesced in the Tarash Valley to form a new polity. According to oral tradition, two principal ancestral lineages settled together in Tarash – variously called Curo and Monia (or Ngicuro and Ngimonia, with the Ateker 'people of..' prefix “Ngi-”) – and over time intermarriage and alliance fused them into one community.

By the time of the Palajam age-set (c. late 18th century), a new identity was fully formed and the people began expanding outward from Tarash. The name Turkana henceforth referred to the unified group, which absorbed or displaced neighboring peoples.

== Historical and anthropological context ==
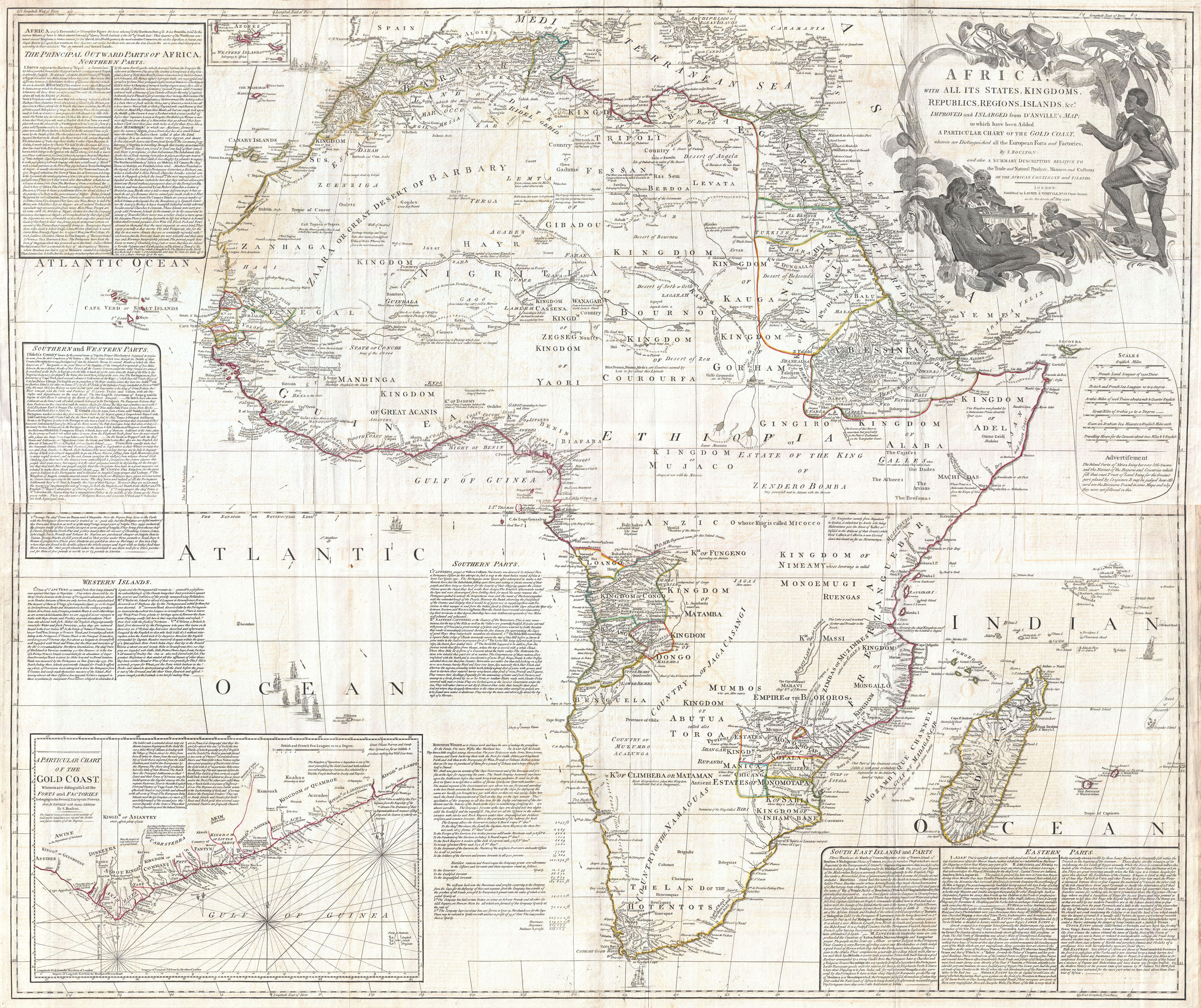
1794 Boulton and Anville Wall Map of Africa: Locates 'Gingiro Kingdom' in a region corresponding roughly to southern Sudan, northeastern Uganda, and northwestern Kenya.

Ateker origins: The Turkana belong to the Ateker peoples (including the Jie, Karimojong, Toposa, Nyangatom, and Iteso). All share a legendary “homeland” at Longiro in present-day South Sudan. The Turkana and Jie (from whom they formed) share an origin myth now known as Nayece and the Grey Bull, in it Engiro (the Grey Bull) leads migration out of Longiro toward Najie (Jie traditional homeland, northwest Uganda), in the case of the Jie, and to the Tarash region, in the case of the Turkana. A separate set of traditions perhaps elucidates this formation process; in the narrative, the people that would become Jie are supposed to have broken off by force from their father's the Karamojong at the Apule River, thus earning themselves the sobriquet Ngijie (the fighting people). Moving back north east, they established themselves at Koten Hill where the group that would ultimately become Turkana broke away peacefully and descended the escarpment into the Tarash.

Nayece legend: In the legend; long ago a woman came from Najie gathering wild fruits. The woman, called Nayece (or Nayeche) moved eastward arriving at the hill now known as Moru a Nayece, near the Tarash river where she settled. Later, a bull (Engiro) got lost in Najie and came to the east following the Tarash river. Young men from Najie tracked the bull and found Nayece and the bull living near Moru a Nayece. They saw that the area was good and thus went back to tell other young men in Najie and they moved to the area and settled there.

Environmental pressures: In the late 1700 or early 1800s a severe drought, recalled as “Aoyate” (long dry time) in Turkana, disrupted life the Rift Valley. Traditions record that during this time the Turkana (now called Turkana but still allied to the Jie) began moving into new pastures.

Early neighbors: As they moved into the Tarash, the communities that settled in the area were neighbored by related Ateker clans (the Jie, Dodos and Karamojong) in present Karamoja, Uganda. Far north a confederacy of 'red people' (Kor, Rantalle, Poran) occupied regions west of the lake now called Turkana. Closer north, another 'red people', the enfeebled Siger held out on Moru a Siger. The Siger had been weakened by the dry season, as the more aesthetically pleasing sanga cattle they kept were far less hardy than the Ateker's zebu. The Turkana’s move into the Tarash valley brought them into contact with these previously unknown “red people”.

== Tarash Valley setting ==
The Tarash (or Tarcha) valley lies below the Karimojong escarpment at the southern end of the Cherangani hills. It runs north–south with grassland and seasonal river water, forming a fertile cattle-grazing basin on the edge of the Turkana desert.

Oral history emphasizes Tarash’s rich pasture and reliable water. Nayeche’s discovery of its “headwaters” and fruit-bearing hillside is noted in tradition. It is consistently named in Turkana lore as the site of early settlements (e.g. the hill Moru a Nayeche) and the joint watering place of the two ancestral groups. From this valley, the Turkana later pushed northward (toward Lake Turkana) and southward when population pressures grew

== Ancestral lineages (Curo and Monia) ==
Lamphear (1988) reports that early Turkana tradition distinguished two adjacent clans or “parts” called Curo and Monia. Each had its own territory around the Tarash and distinctive dress (women of Curo versus Monia wore different ornaments). The two shared the same watering wells but maintained separate herds and clan identities in the early years of settlement. The Ateker plural prefix Ngi- (meaning “people of”) would render these as Ngicuro and Ngimonia

An alternative version (Emley 1927) names two founding Turkana groups as Nithir and Ngamatak. According to this account, both moved to the Turkwel River; the Nithir then split into two sub-groups (one kept “Nithir” as a name, the other became “Nibelai”). Together these yielded three early Turkana adakari (clan-blocks): Ngamatak (west), Nithir (center), and Nibelai (south). In this tradition, Nithir is said to derive from ithiger (an ornament), reflecting “love of decoration” among that clan. (These terms appear to refer to the same ancestral divisions as Curo/Monia, using different names in Turkana lore.)

Lamphear (1976) concurs with Nagashima who has convincingly argued that the two major divisions present in Turkana society represent the two groups that originally formed the tribe: the Ngicuro and Ngimonia. Further and in light of this, he suggests that the Nayece legend is actually a composite of two traditions; one relating to the origin of the earlier Ngicuro division, and the other to the latter arriving Ngimonia. He imagines the 'old woman' as representing a whole group of people, the Ngicuro, who placed a strong reliance on gathering for their subsistence. It is only later that the 'young men' come to the east to join Nayece and introduce intensive pastoralism to the area.

=== Curo lineage ===
The Curo lineage is generally taken to be the older lineage. This is suggested by the exclusive presence of all 'universal clans' of the Turkana among the Ngicuro. As well, Ngicuro clan observances include the lobunat finalization of the marriage ceremony and the wearing of gazelle skins, both observances common to early people groups in Uganda. And most evidently, in the ceremony of akiwodokin or angola, in which groups pass through the gate in the order in which they settled the land, Ngicuro groups usually precede Ngimonia groups when there is a joint ceremony.

=== Monia lineage ===
Various ethnographers have collected congruent traditions that state that the immigrants from Najie arrived on the Tarash while the Palajam were still initiating. Further, a number of reports have recorded that they were accompanied by a considerable number of members of earlier generation set(s), specifically the Emisse also called Ngimis or Ngimiik. Alignments of the age sets to contemporary dates suggest that the migration from Najie to Tarash took place no later than about 1740.

== Merging and identity formation ==
Alliance and intermarriage: Lamphear notes that Turkana family traditions present a picture of increasing kinship between certain clans from the Curo and Monia sections, arising from frequent intermarriage. There was no Turkana identity in the early years at Tarash, just two people groups, living in separate but adjacent territories. Traditions however suggest that kinship between the clans that would intermarry sometimes transcended the distinction between the major parts.

Adoption of “Turkana” name: Once the two halves were indistinguishable, the combined population began calling itself Turkana. The name, is said to derive from the word naturkwan (a cave) and is thought to suggest that some of the settlers at Moru a Nayece lived in caves. This self-designation replaced the separate lineage names and marked the birth of a unified Turkana ethnic identity. The Turkana then prepared to expand.

== Dispersal from Tarash ==
After leaving Tarash, the Turkana split into three branch territories. By the early 20th century these were known as the Ngamatak (southwest), Nithir (north), and Nibelai (southeast) adakari. These correspond to sub-clans within modern Turkana society. Despite the split, all identified as Turkana, sharing language and customs.

== See also ==
Ethnogenesis of the Nandi
