= Kadam =

Kadam may refer to:

- Kadam (clan), an Indian clan
- Kadam (Tibetan Buddhism), a school of Buddhism
- Kadam People, an ethnic group in Uganda
- Kadam Rao Padam Rao, the earliest available manuscript in Dakhini masnavi
- Kadam River, a minor tributary of Godavari located in the Adilabad District of Telangana
- Kadam virus of the Flavivirus genus
- Mount Kadam, in the Karamoja region of Uganda
- Neolamarckia cadamba, a tree commonly called kadam
- Kadam, one of the Egyptian units of measurement
- Kadam, temple priests in Tulja Bhavani Temple, Maharashtra, India

== See also ==
- Kedam (disambiguation)
- Kedem (disambiguation)
- Qadam (disambiguation)
