= Soo language =

Moribund Kuliak language spoken in Uganda

Soo
- Tepes
- Region: Uganda
- Ethnicity: 5,000 So (2007)
- Native speakers: 30 (2022)
- Language family: Nilo-Saharan?: Kuliak; Nyang'i–Soo; Soo
- Dialects: Tepes; Kadam; Napak

Language codes
- ISO 639-3: teu
- Glottolog: sooo1256
- ELP: Soo
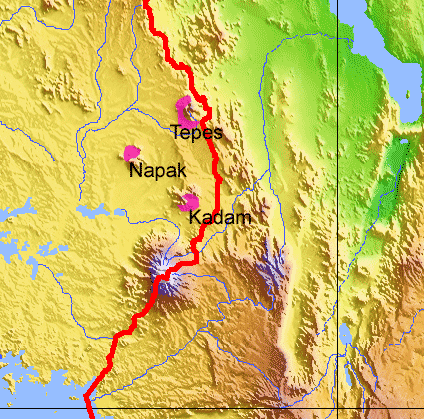

Soo or So is the Kuliak language of the Tepes people of northeastern Uganda. The language is moribund, with most of the population of 5,000 having shifted to Karamojong, and only a few dozen elderly individuals are still able to speak Soo. Soo is divided into three major dialects: Tepes, Kadam (Katam), and Napak (Yog Toŋi).

There are between 3,000 and 10,000 ethnic Soo people (Carlin 1993). They were historically hunter-gatherers, but have recently shifted to pastoralism and subsistence farming like their Nilotic and Bantu neighbors. Beer (2009: 2) found that most Soo villages have only one speaker remaining. Thus, the speakers rarely have a chance to actively use the Soo language.

== Dialects ==
Soo dialects are spoken on the slopes of the following three mountains in east-central Uganda just to the north of Mount Elgon.

- Tepes dialect (also called Tepeth), on the slopes of Mount Moroto in Moroto District, Uganda. It is spoken in the Kakingol, Lea, and Tapac valleys on the slopes the Mount Moroto. The dominant language in the area is Karimojong. Most Tepes people have assimilated both linguistically and culturally with the Karimojong people. Villages include Akeme, Nabuin, and Mokora, as well as Naripo Kakole.
- Kadam dialect, on the slopes of Mount Kadam in Nakapiripirit District, Uganda. Villages include Nakapeliethe and Nakaapiripirit. Kadam data is primarily available in Heine (m.s.). The dominant language in the area is Pokot. According to Carlin (1993), Mount Kadam has the highest concentration of ethnic So people.
- Napak dialect, on the slopes of Mount Napak in Napak District, Uganda (no speakers found as of 1993).

There are fewer than 60 elderly speakers of all three dialects combined.

Carlin (1993: 2-3) notes that there are only minor differences between the Tepes and Kadam dialects, which are mutually intelligible.

== Grammar ==
So grammar has been described by Beer, et al. (2009).

Word order is VSO (verb–subject–object). So has rich verbal morphology.

=== Pronouns ===
So nominative and accusative pronouns are:

| | Singular | Plural |
|---|---|---|
| 1st | aja | inja/izja |
| 2nd | bija | bitja |
| 3rd | ica | iɟa |

=== Interrogatives ===
So interrogatives are:

- Who/What: /ic/
- When: /ita/
- Where: /eoko/
- Why: /ikun/
- How: /gwate/
- How Many/How Much: /intanac/

=== Tenses ===
There are four verb tenses:

- past tense
- present tense
- future tense (general)
- future tense (specific)

=== Affixes ===
Some So affixes are:

- /kɔ-/: immediate future
- /-ak/: passivity
- /no-/: relative clause coordinator
- /ɪn-/: general negation
- /lan/: past negation
- /ipa/: imperative negation
- /-tɛz/: inchoative marker
- /-uk/: locative marker
- /-ok/: instrumental marker
- /-a/: goal marker
- /kun-/: dative pronouns
- /-ak/: dative pronouns

Singular suffixes are /-at/, /an/, /-ɛn/, and /-it/.

Plural suffixes are /-in/, /-ɛk/, /-ɛz/, /-an/, /-ɛl/, /-ra/, /-ce/, /-ɔt/, and /-e/.
