= Qadam (disambiguation) =

Qadam or Al-Qadam is a municipality and a neighborhood in Damascus, Syria.

Qadam or Al-Qadam may also refer to:

== Given name ==
- Qadam Shah Shahim (born 1962), Afghan diplomat and former army officer
- Qadam Kheyr (1899–1933), notable Luri woman, Iran

== Places ==
- Al Qadam, village in the Northern Governorate of the Kingdom of Bahrain
- Kalateh-ye Qadam, village in Iran
- Shah Qadam, village in Iran
- Qaleh-ye Qadam, village in Iran

== See also ==
- Kadam (disambiguation)
