= Amudat District =

- District
- District location in Uganda
- Coordinates: 01°57′N 34°57′E
- Country: Uganda
- Region: Northern Uganda
- Sub-region: Karamoja sub-region
- Established: 1 July 2010
- Capital: Amudat

Area
  - Total: 1,615.4 km^{2} (623.7 sq mi)
- Elevation: 1,280 m (4,200 ft)

Population (2013 Estimate)
  - Total: 143,300
  - Density: 70.4/km^{2} (182/sq mi)
- Time zone: UTC+3 (EAT)
- Website: www.amudat.go.ug

Amudat District is a district in Northern Uganda. Like most Ugandan districts, it is named after its 'chief town', Amudat, where the district headquarters are located.

== Location ==
Amudat District is bordered by Moroto District to the north, the Republic of Kenya to the east, Bukwa District and Kween District to the south and Nakapiripirit District to the west. Amudat, where the district headquarters are located, lies approximately 38 kilometres (24 mi), by road, northeast of Nakapiripirit, the nearest large town. This location is approximately 400 kilometres (250 mi), by road, northeast of Kampala, Uganda's capital and largest city. The coordinates of the district are:01 57N, 34 57E (Latitude:1.9500; Longitude:34.9500).

== Overview ==
Amudat District was carved out of Nakapiripirit District in 2010. The district is administered by the Amudat District Administration, with headquarters at Amudat. The main ethnic group in the district are the Pokot, a group that shares a common culture and customs with the Pokot and Kalenjin of Kenya. The district is part of the Karamoja sub-region. The district that constitute Karamoja sub-region include:(a) Abim District (b) Amudat District (c) Kaabong District (d) Kotido District (e) Moroto District (f) Nakapiripirit District (g) Napak District. According to the 2002 national census, Karamoja sub-region was home to close to one million people, at that time.

== Population ==
In 1991, the national population census determined the district population at about 11,340. The 2002 national census estimated the population in the district at approximately 63,600. The district population was determined to be growing at an annual rate of 6.1%, between 2002 and 2012. In 2012, the population of Amudat District was estimated at 113,700. In 2013, the district population, was estimated at 143,300.

== See also ==
- Amudat
- Karamoja sub-region
- Northern Region, Uganda
- Districts of Uganda
