= Kedam (disambiguation) =

Kedam may refer to:

- Great frigatebird, also known as Kedam in Palauan
- Rael Kedam, Palauan ridge
- PSS Kedam, patrol boat named after the bird
- Kedam, character in Ultraman Max

== See also ==
- Kadam (disambiguation)
