= Embobut =

Administrative ward in Kenya

Coordinates: 01°13′N 35°38′E

Embobut (Embobit, Embotut) is one of the administrative wards for the Marakwet East Constituency in Elgeyo-Marakwet County, Kenya. The area contains one of two major drainage basins for Elgeyo-Marakwet County, referred to locally as a "water towers". The other water tower in Elgeyo-Marakwet County is Cherangani Hills. Embobut supplies Eldoret town and its environs with water. Collectively the Embobut and Cherangani Hills water towers also supply water to the Kerio River, which flows through the Cheploch Gorge in Baringo to Lake Turkana via the Turkwel Gorge.

The Embobut Forest is one of the largest continuous blocks of indigenous forest remaining in East Africa. As of 6 November 1954, it was gazetted and registered as a protected public forest, by Proclamation Order 26. Soil erosion and landslides are ongoing concerns, as is the protection of the water supply and biodiversity, impacts on climate, and local livelihoods.

The water towers store rainwater, enable regular river flows, recharge ground-water storage, improve soil fertility, reduce erosion and sediment in river water, and host a diverse species of plants and animals.

— Delegation of the European Union to Kenya, 2018

== Conflict over forest lands ==
The Embobut Forest has become the site of ongoing dissent and violent conflict over the ownership and use of forest lands. The Sengwer people have been the target of repeated and forcible evictions from the area by the Kenya Forest Service (KFS) and other governmental agencies.

Embobut Forest. As with many of Kenya’s gazetted forests, Embobut has been characterized by periodic evictions of people deemed to be residing in the forest illegally. The Report of the Embobut Task Force cited 20 such evictions since the 1980s. During the NRMP period, Requesters claim that KFS participated in forceful evictions of Cherangany-Sengwer from Embobut in 2007, 2008, 2009, 2010, 2011 and 2013... in 2009... over 400 families were evicted and a large number of houses, belongings, and crops destroyed by forest guards, regular and administrative police, and Kenya Wildlife Service rangers to prevent people from returning into the forest.

— The Inspection Panel, 2014

International and human rights organizations including the United Nations, Amnesty International and the Kenya Human Rights Commission recognize the Sengwer as indigenous peoples whose claim to the area goes back hundreds of years and who are potentially productive partners in managing their lands. In contrast, the Kenyan government has promoted "the government narrative that there are no people living in Embobut forest", describing all residents in the forest as illegal "squatters" and "minority communities", differences in terminology that can have important cultural, legal and political implications.

As of 2007, the World Bank supported a forest conservation project in the area, expressing the hope that it would "improve the livelihoods of communities participating in the co-management of water and forests." In spite of policy frameworks against the evictions of indigenous peoples, repeated violations occurred. The World Bank has been heavily criticized for its involvement in the area and for its failure to require that its own standards for the treatment of indigenous people were met.

As of 2016, the European Union supported a conservation plan for the area, with the goals of protecting the water towers and biodiversity, while still respecting the rights of the indigenous Sengwer people. This resulted in renewed evictions and violence against the Sengwer, in which Kenyan Forest Service guards fired gunshots, burned homes and killed livestock. On 16 January 2018 herder Robert Kirotich was shot and killed and David Kipkosgei Kiptilkesi was injured by the KFS. As of January 17, 2018, the European Union suspended its financial support for the Kenyan Government's Water Towers Protection and Climate Change Mitigation and Adaptation Programme (WATER), as a result of ongoing abuses of the human rights of indigenous people in the conservation areas.

As of October, 2018, the Sengwar were preparing an international petition to be taken to the African Court on Human and Peoples' Rights in Arusha, Tanzania. They argue that a renewal of their traditional land management practices would be more effective for forest management than the actions of the KFS.

== Personages ==
Some of the most prominent personalities in the former Marakwet District come from the Embobut region. They include former politicians, such as Robert Kiptoo Kipkorir, and the first female MP from Marakwet community, Kipchumba Murkomen CS Interior and former Elgeyo Marakwet Senator, Linah Jebii Kilimo.
