= Amudat =

- Location in Uganda
- Coordinates: 01°57′08″N 34°56′40″E
- Country: Uganda
- Region: Northern Uganda
- Sub-region: Karamoja sub-region
- District: Amudat District
- Elevation: 4,200 ft (1,280 m)

Population (2011 Estimate)
  - Total: 1,900

Amudat is a town in Northern Uganda. It is the main municipal, administrative and commercial center of Amudat District and the district headquarters are located there. The district is named after the town Amudat, located in the northeastern region of Uganda and border Kenya.

== Location ==
Amudat is located in Amudat District, Karamoja sub-region, in Northern Uganda. It lies 85 kilometres (53 mi) southeast of Moroto, the largest town in the sub-region and 400 kilometres (250 mi) northeast of Kampala, Uganda's capital and largest city. The coordinates of the town are:01 57 00N, 34 57 00E (Latitude:1°57'08.0"N, 34°56'40.0"E (Latitude:1.952223; Longitude:34.944445).

== Overview ==
Amudat was selected to be the headquarters of the newly established Amudat District, which was created by Act of Parliament and began functioning on 1 July 2010. The town is the most eastward of all the 111 district capitals in Uganda.

== Population ==
As of January 2011, it was estimated that the population of Amudat was about 1,900.

== Points of interest ==
The following points of interest lie within the town limits or near its borders:

- The headquarters of Amudat District Administration
- The offices of Amudat Town Council
- Amudat Hospital - A 100-bed public hospital, administered by the Church Missionary Society
- Amudat Central Market

== See also ==
- Amudat District
- Karamoja
- Northern Uganda
