= Oropom language =

Unclassified extinct language of Africa

Oropom
- (spurious?)
- Native to: Kenya, Uganda
- Ethnicity: Oropom people
- Extinct: c. 1950
- Language family: unclassified

Language codes
- ISO 639-3: None (mis)
- Glottolog: (insufficiently attested or not a distinct language) orop1234

Oropom (Oworopom, Oyoropom, Oropoi) is an African language, possibly spurious and, if real, almost certainly extinct. The language was purportedly once spoken by the Oropom people in northeastern Uganda and northwestern Kenya between the Turkwel River, the Chemorongit Mountains, and Mount Elgon.

== Documentation ==
There is only one article containing any original research on the language, Wilson (1970), which only a handful of other articles discuss. John G. Wilson's article furnishes only a short word list, and was written at a time when the language, if it existed, was nearly extinct. The article was based mainly on the limited memories of two very old women, one "a child of one of the residual Oropom families that had remained after the break-up of the Oropom here (Matheniko county)" who "remembered a few words of the language", the other an old lady called Akol "descended from the prisoners taken by the Karimojong on the Turkwel" who was "able to furnish many Oropom words". Under the circumstances, only the barest details of Oropom could be ascertained.

On this basis, Wilson concluded that it must have had at least two dialects: one spoken around the Turkwel area, containing a significant number of Luo words, and some Bantu words, and one spoken around Matheniko county with fewer Luo words. Both contain Kalenjin loanwords.

== Classification ==
Wilson ascribed it to the Khoisan group, seemingly based solely on its physical appearance; but this identification is unreliable; Harold C. Fleming describes it as a "ridiculous suggestion". Elderkin (1983) says that "The Oropom data of Wilson (1970) shows some resemblances to Kuliak, some of which could well be mediated through Nilotic, with which it seems to have more resemblances (F. Rottland, personal communication)... There are many fewer resemblances worth noting with Hadza and only a minimal number with Sandawe." He quotes eight potentially similar words between Oropom and Hadza, and four between Oropom and Sandawe. Harold Fleming also notes that "initial inspection suggests some possible commonality" between Oropom and the Kuliak languages, a probably Nilo-Saharan relic group found in Northern Uganda among such tribes as the Ik. However, in the absence of further work, Oropom remains an unclassified language.

== Status ==
Bernd Heine, who surveyed the area less than ten years after Wilson and found no trace of the language, expressed skepticism that it existed at all. Both Lionel Bender and Roger Blench have opined that the language was made up as a joke. Souag (2004) lists several motives Wilson's informants might have had to fabricate the language, and observes that even in his article, Wilson notes that he had to deal with "charlatans" once word got out that he was looking for anyone with knowledge of the language.

== Vocabulary ==
This wordlist, taken from the appendix to Wilson (1970), is based on Akol's memories (and thus is considered by Wilson as belonging to the "Turkwell dialect"). He says that he collected words from the other dialect as well, but apparently never published them. The list consists of less than a hundred words, which are likely to be all the vocabulary that will ever be known of the language.

- Arrow: motit
- Bad: girito
- Black: timu
- Blue: puthia
- To boil water: mak
- Bow: terema
- To burn: mala
- Breast: kisina
- Brother: lukiya
- Bull: losogol
- Cat: ariet
- Cattle: pange
- Chalcedony: atunatun
- Child: muto
- Clever person: woth
- To cook: ipo
- Cooking pot (black): kiriente
- Cooking pot: kodo
- Cow: ngobo
- Cowrie shell: pel
- Crocodile: moro
- To cut: tubo
- Day: awar
- To dig: chege
- Dog: kokuye
- Dry: de-au
- Ear-ring: napiroi
- Ear: ki-ito
- Egg: iken
- Eland: ongor
- Enemy: bu
- Eye: kongiye
- Fat: moda
- Father: mamunyu
- Fire: emaa
- Fish: karu
- food: araukoo
- Fool: bung
- Foot: apaukoo
- Gazelle: tuth
- To give: we
- Goat: ngoror
- Good: pau
- Grass: purung
- Grooved design on pots: nacipa
- Hair: akopito
- Hand: akeleng
- Hard: keter
- Honey: madik
- House: apirgoo
- Leopard: meri
- To lie down: lura
- Lion: ru
- Man: muren
- Mark on forehead: nageran
- To marry: ritha
- Meat: apintoo
- Milk: coko
- Moon: Pele
- Mother-in-law: yo
- Mother: iyoo
- Neck bangles: gorom
- Night: riono
- Nose: torom
- Oil: konoye
- Old man: kuko
- Old woman: kukuye
- Penis: oyaa
- Rain: lat
- To receive: aruka
- Red: kopurat
- Seer: murwe
- Sheep: merek
- Sister: pese
- To sit: paja
- To sleep: sanan
- Snake: kwolta
- Soft: lujuk
- Soil: nyapid
- To speak: dokol
- Spear: ngokit
- Stone wrist bangle: aurare
- Sun: Aca
- To swim: redik
- Thief: mokorat
- Tooth: ne-et
- Tree: telegai
- Vagina: kibunte
- To walk: pauwo
- Warrior: lim
- Water: lata
- Wet: ret
- White: pele
- Witch: ariet
- Wizard: rimirim
- Woman: nakwanta
- Women's apron: ongor

== Bibliography ==
- J. G. Wilson. "Preliminary Observations on the Oropom People of Karamoja, their Ethnic Status, Culture, and Postulated Relation to the Peoples of the Late Stone Age." The Uganda Journal, 34, 2, 1970. pp. 125–145.
- Elderkin, E. D. (1983) 'Tanzanian and Ugandan isolates'. In Nilotic studies: proceedings of the international symposium on languages and history of the Nilotic peoples, Cologne, January 4–6, 1982 vol. 2 / Rainer Vossen, Marianne Bechhaus-Gerst (eds), vol. 2, pp 499–521.
- Harold C. Fleming (1983) 'Kuliak External Relations: Step One'. In Nilotic studies: proceedings of the international symposium on languages and history of the Nilotic peoples, Cologne, January 4–6, 1982 vol. 2 / Rainer Vossen, Marianne Bechhaus-Gerst (eds), vol. 2, p. 429.
- Blench, Roger M. 1999. "Are the African pygmies an ethnographic fiction?" Central African hunter-gatherers in a multidisciplinary perspective: challenging elusiveness, pp 41–60. Edited by Karen Biesbrouck, Stefan Elders & Gerda Rossel. Research School of Asian, African and Amerindian Studies (CNWS), State University of Leiden. Leiden.
- Blench, Roger M. 1993. "Recent Developments in African Language Classification" The Archaeology of Africa: Food, Metals and Towns (ISBN 041511585X), edited by Thurstan Shaw, page 135.
