= Milka Chepkorir =

Kenyan Indigenous rights advocate (born 1990)

- Born: c. 1990; Kapolet Forest, Kenya
- Citizenship: Kenyan
- Education: Maseno University; University of Nairobi
- Occupations: Anthropologist, Indigenous rights advocate, environmental activist
- Organization(s): Community Land Action NOW! (CLAN); ICCA Consortium
- Known for: Advocacy for the land rights of the Sengwer people

Milka Chepkorir (Note: Some sources use the fuller name Milka Chepkorir Kuto.) (born c. 1990) is a Kenyan anthropologist, Indigenous rights advocate and environmental activist. She is a member of the Sengwer Indigenous Peoples of the Cherangani Hills in Kenya and is known for her advocacy on community land rights, Indigenous-led conservation and the rights of Sengwer communities affected by evictions from forest lands.

Chepkorir has represented Sengwer concerns in United Nations processes and was an Indigenous Fellow at the Office of the United Nations High Commissioner for Human Rights in 2016. She has also worked with Community Land Action NOW! (CLAN), Natural Justice and the ICCA Consortium on land rights, conservation and community governance issues.

== Early life and education ==
Chepkorir is from the Sengwer community of the Cherangani Hills region. The OHCHR described her in 2016 as a member of the Sengwer Indigenous people, whose communities occupy the Embobut and Kapolet forest areas in Kenya's Rift Valley. In a 2017 profile, she described herself as an Indigenous woman, an anthropologist and an advocate for the rights of Indigenous women and children in the Sengwer community.

She holds a bachelor's degree in anthropology from Maseno University. The Global Diversity Foundation and ICCA Consortium have reported that she has pursued a master's degree in gender and development studies at the University of Nairobi.

== Activism and advocacy ==
Chepkorir's activism began while she was in high school. In an OHCHR profile published during her 2016 Indigenous Fellowship, she said that her work was motivated by forced evictions and human rights violations experienced by her community. The same profile stated that her activism initially focused on the rights of girls, later expanding to women and Indigenous forest dwellers more broadly.

In 2016, Chepkorir participated in the UN Human Rights Office Indigenous Fellowship Programme in Geneva. The programme trains Indigenous fellows in the United Nations human rights system and mechanisms for the promotion and protection of Indigenous peoples' rights. She later participated in UN sessions on Indigenous peoples, including the Expert Mechanism on the Rights of Indigenous Peoples and the United Nations Permanent Forum on Indigenous Issues.

At the 2017 session of the Permanent Forum, Chepkorir presented a joint statement on behalf of Forest Peoples Programme, Natural Justice and more than twenty other organisations. The statement criticised the lack of implementation of the United Nations Declaration on the Rights of Indigenous Peoples in conservation policies and practices, and raised concerns about evictions of Sengwer communities in Kenya.

Chepkorir has been particularly associated with criticism of what advocates describe as "fortress conservation", a conservation model that excludes or removes Indigenous peoples from protected areas. The Joke Waller-Hunter Initiative described her work as focused on securing land tenure rights and policies for Sengwer communities and other Indigenous peoples in Kenya and across Africa.

== Sengwer land-rights dispute ==
The Sengwer community has long disputed evictions from the Embobut Forest and other parts of the Cherangani Hills. In January 2018, Thomson Reuters Foundation reported that Sengwer activists said Kenya Forest Service guards had begun fresh evictions in Embobut Forest in connection with an EU-funded water-conservation programme. Chepkorir, speaking as an activist from the community, alleged that homes had been burned during the evictions. The Kenya Forest Service denied knowledge of evictions during the Christmas and New Year period, while Kenya's environment ministry corroborated that position.

On 17 January 2018, the European External Action Service announced that the European Union had suspended support for the Water Towers Protection and Climate Change Mitigation and Adaptation Programme following reports of human rights abuses and the reported killing of a member of the Sengwer community by Kenya Forest Service guards. The EU stated that its support for conservation of Kenya's water towers was not expected to involve evictions or the use of violence.

== Career and affiliations ==
Chepkorir has worked with organisations focused on Indigenous peoples' rights, environmental justice and community land governance. In 2020, she was an Environmental Justice Fellow at Natural Justice in Kenya, working particularly on integrating Natural Justice's objectives into Community Land Action NOW! programmes.

The ICCA Consortium lists Chepkorir as a former Policy and Advocacy Co-Coordinator for Africa from 2021 to 2024. It also states that she coordinates Community Land Action NOW! (CLAN), a network of Kenyan rural communities seeking to register community lands, and that she has represented her community in different UN processes.

Her work has also addressed gender inclusion in Indigenous land-rights struggles. The ICCA Consortium states that her interest in gender inclusion has informed her work with community leadership and women to incorporate gender issues into land-rights advocacy.

== See also ==
- Sengwer people
- Indigenous rights
- Community land
- Environmental justice
- United Nations Permanent Forum on Indigenous Issues
