= Bokora Corridor Wildlife Reserve =

Protected area in northeastern Uganda

- IUCN category IV (habitat/species management area)
- Location within Uganda
- Nearest city: Moroto
- Coordinates: 2°26′N 34°00′E
- Area: 205,600 ha (794 sq mi)
- Established: 1964

Bokora Corridor Wildlife Reserve is a conservation protected area in northeastern Uganda.

== See also ==
- Lorengecora
