= Mount Moroto =

Mountain in Uganda

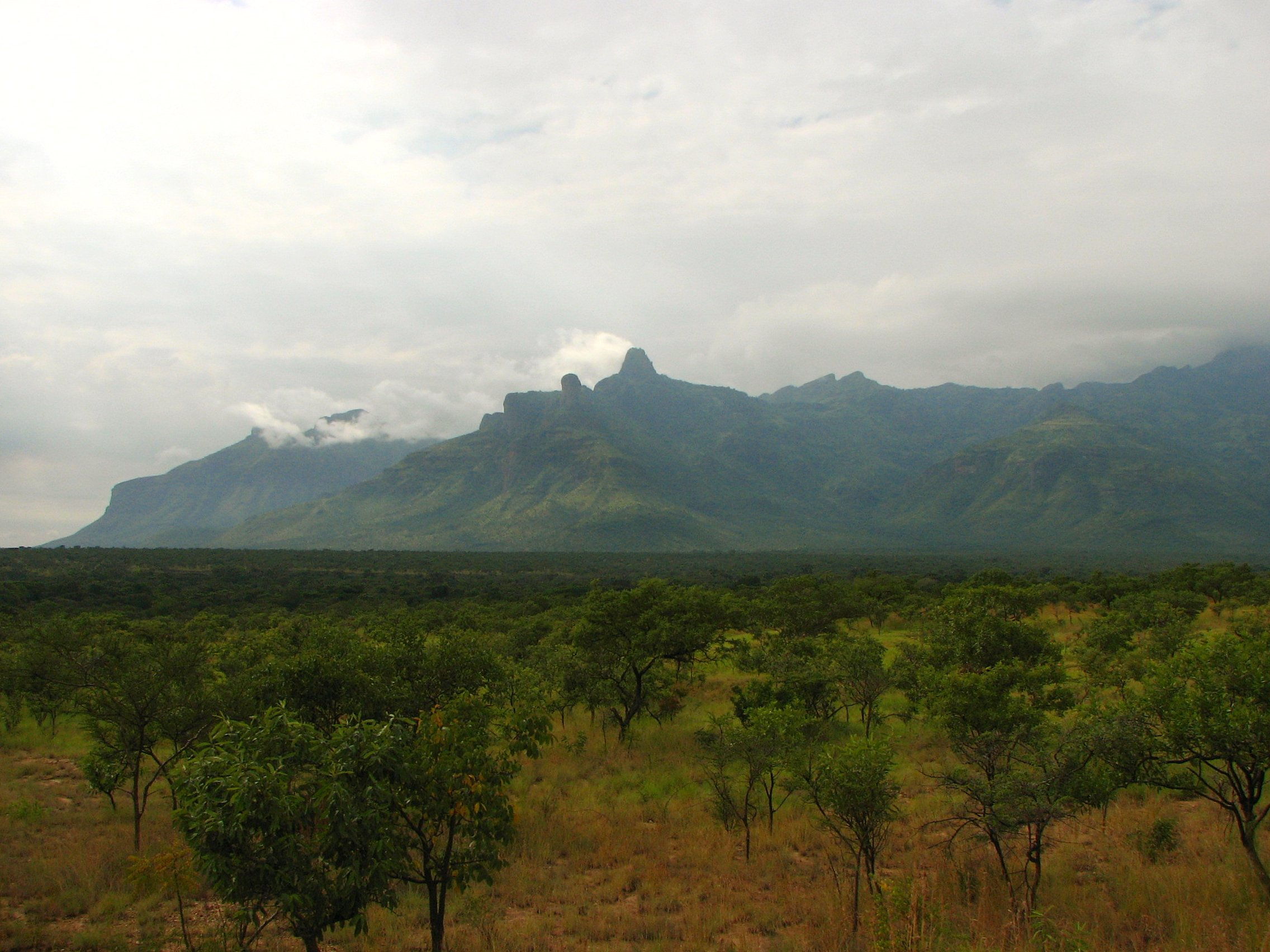

Highest point
- Elevation: 3,083 m (10,115 ft)
- Prominence: 1,818 m (5,965 ft)
- Coordinates: 02°31′30″N 34°46′21″E

Geography
- Location within Uganda
- Location: Moroto, Uganda

Mount Moroto, also Moroto Mountain (3,083 m or 10,115 ft), is a mountain in the Northeastern part of Uganda.

The native name for this mountain was "Moru To" (meaning "the western mountain", derived from the words "Moru" meaning mountain and "To" meaning west). It was named so because during the migration of the native tribes, who originated from Ethiopia, it appeared west.

== Location ==
The mountain is adjacent to the town of Moroto in Moroto District, Karamoja, Northern Region of Uganda. It is approximately 3 kilometres (1.9 mi), by road, east of Moroto's central business district. Mount Moroto is one of a chain of volcanoes along Uganda's international border with Kenya that begins with Mount Elgon in the south and includes Mount Kadam and Mount Morungole. The region around Mount Moroto is a forest reserve protecting a range of habitats from arid thorn savanna to dry montane forest. The coordinates of Mount Moroto are 2°31'30.0"N, 34°46'21.0"E (Latitude:2.5250; Longitude:34.7725).

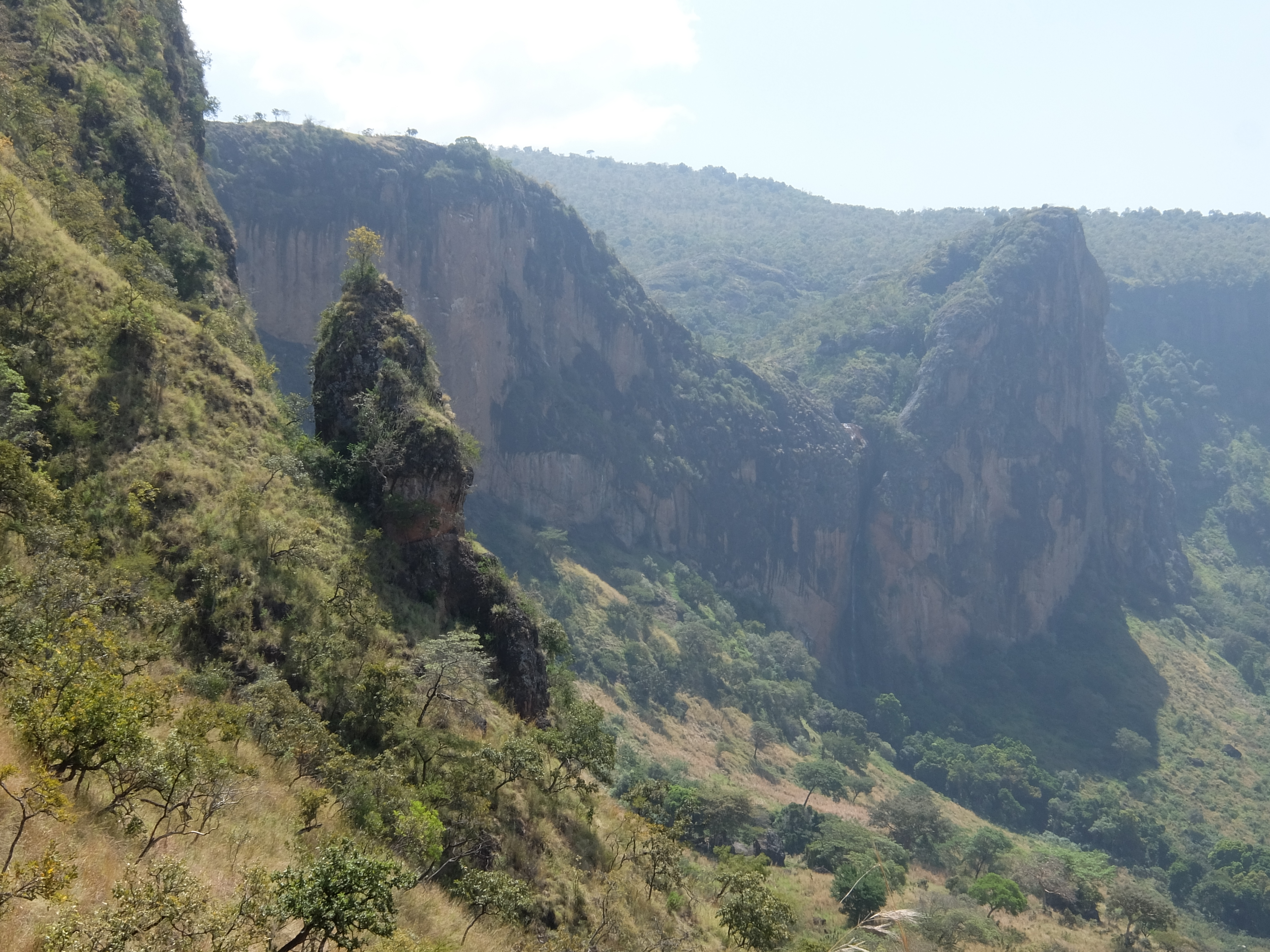
A cliff on the southwestern part of Mount Moroto, near Moroto Town

== Mountain climbing ==
The nature reserve that encloses Mount Moroto measures 483 square kilometres (119,000 acres) and contains over 220 bird species, monkeys and wild cats. Climbing trails exist and mountain guides are available.

== Farming and irrigation ==
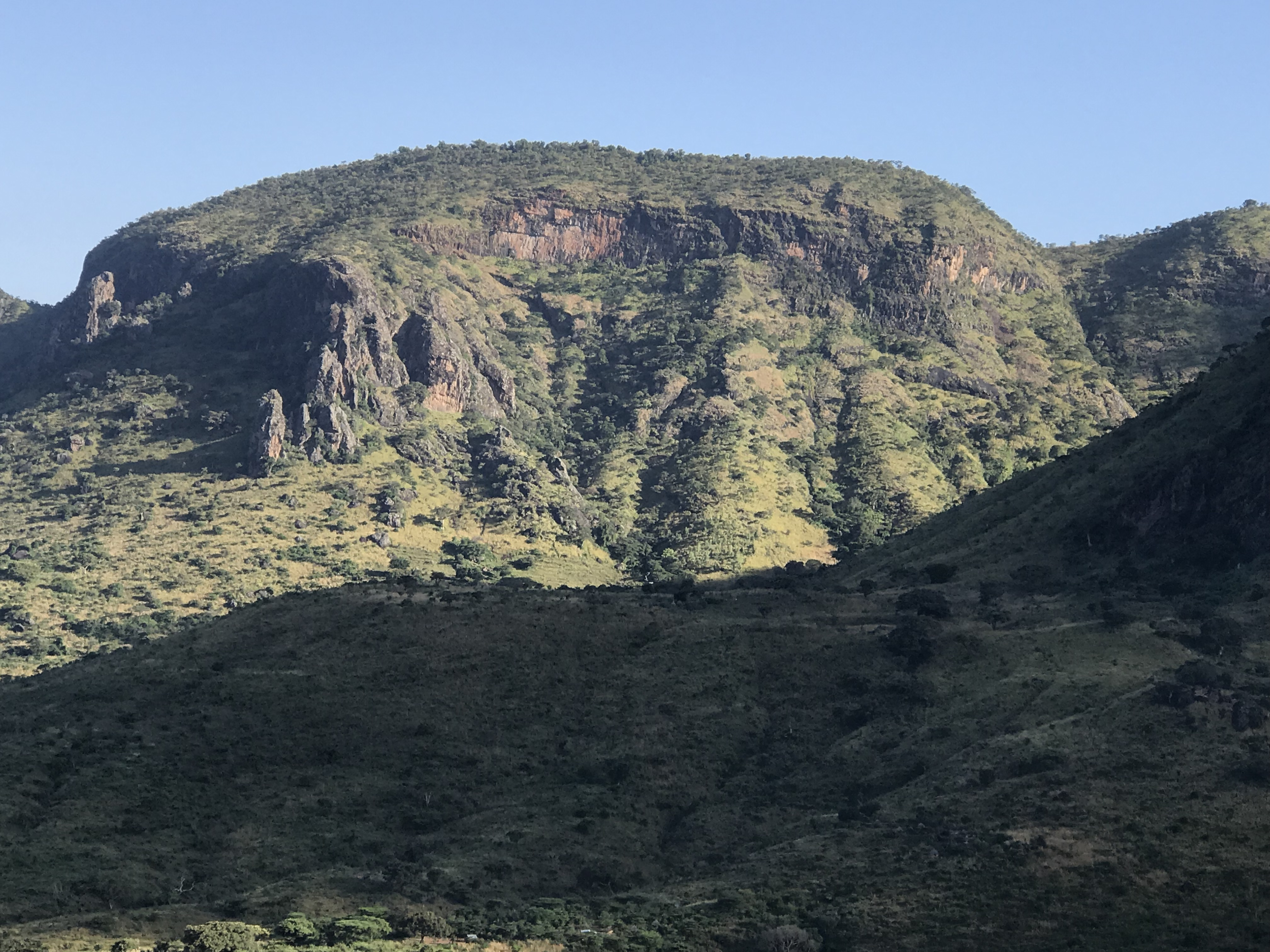
The Exquisite Mount Moroto.jpg

The natural springs on the slopes of the mountain coalesce to form springs and small rivers. The World Food Programme is teaching the Karimajong people how to harvest and store that water and use it to irrigate agricultural produce for household food and for income generation.

== Demographics ==
Speakers of the moribund Soo language live on the slopes of Mount Moroto.

== See also ==
- List of Ultras of Africa
- Rwenzori Mountains
