= Nakapiripirit =

Town in Uganda

- Map of Uganda showing the location of Nakapiripirit
- Coordinates: 01°51′08″N 34°43′17″E
- Country: Uganda
- Region: Northern Region of Uganda
- Sub-region: Karamoja sub-region
- District: Nakapiripirit District
- Elevation: 1,450 m (4,760 ft)

Population (2014 Census)
  - Total: 3,727
- Time zone: UTC+3 (EAT)

Nakapiripirit is a town in the Nakapiripirit District of the Northern Region of Uganda. It is the seat of the district headquarters. As an administrative unit of the district, it is one of the eight sub-counties in the district.

== Location ==
Nakapiripirit is located in Nakapiripirit District, approximately 130 kilometres (81 mi), by road, northeast of Mbale, the nearest large city. This is approximately 94 kilometres (58 mi), by road, south of Moroto, the largest urban center in the Karamoja sub-region. Nakapiripirit lies 353 kilometres (219 mi) northeast of Kampala, the capital and largest city of Uganda. The coordinates of Nakapiripirit Town are 01°51'08.0"N 34°43'17.0"E (Latitude:1.852222; Longitude:34.721389). Nakapiripirit town sits at an average elevation of 1,450 metres (4,757 ft) above mean sea level. Nakapiripirit was classified as tropical savanna climate according to Köppen-Geiger climate classification.

== Population ==
The 2002 national population census estimated the population of the town at 1,640. In 2010, the Uganda Bureau of Statistics (UBOS) estimated the mid-year population at 2,600. In 2011, UBOS estimated the population at 2,800. The 2014 population census enumerated the population of the town at 3,727 people.

== Points of interest ==
The following additional points of interest lie in Nakapiripirit or near its borders:

- offices of Nakapiripirit Town Council
- Nakapiripirit central market
- Moroto–Nakapiripirit Road passes through the middle of town, where it links up with Muyembe–Nakapiripirit Road

Hill View Resort, located in town and overlooking Mount Kadam, offers accommodation, meals and entertainment. Mount Kadam itself is about 25 kilometres (16 mi), as the crow flies, southwest of Nakapiripirit Town, with an estimated driving distance of about 30 kilometres (19 mi).

== See also ==
- List of cities and towns in Uganda
