= Kalateh-ye Qadam =

Kalateh-ye Qadam كلاته قدم
- Village
- Location within Iran
- Coordinates: 35°49′20″N 60°24′03″E
- Country: Iran
- Province: Razavi Khorasan
- County: Mashhad
- Bakhsh: Razaviyeh
- Rural District: Pain Velayat

Population (2006)
  - Total: 81
- Time zone: UTC+3:30 (IRST)
  - Summer (DST): UTC+4:30 (IRDT)

Kalateh-ye Qadam (Persian: كلاته قدم, also Romanized as Kalāteh-ye Qadam; also known as Kalāteh-ye Karbalā’ī Qadam) is a village in Pain Velayat Rural District, Razaviyeh District, Mashhad County, Razavi Khorasan Province, Iran. At the 2006 census, its population was 81, in 19 families.
