= Chok people =

Society that lived on the Elgeyo Escarpment in Kenya

The Chok were a society that lived on the Elgeyo Escarpment in Kenya.

== Etymology ==
It is noted that the old men living in Pokot during the early 20th century were unanimous in declaring that;

there always were two original Suk tribes living on the Elgeyo escarpment. The names of these two tribes were Chok or Chuk which is the name for a short sword like implement, and Sekker which means 'cowrie shells'

— The Suk -Their Language and Folklore, Beech, M., 1911

== Territory ==
Their territory was "on the Elgeyo Escarpment" and while they lived on the Elgeyo escarpment the Kerio Valley was occupied by the Sambur. "..If ever the Suk descended from their fastness, they were raided and harried by this tribe".

== Way of life ==
=== Residence ===
Von Hönnel writing following his journey to Lake Turkana, remarked on the residences of the Suk, using much the same terms that other writers would make use of;

...The sedentary Suk are restricted to the eastern slopes of the mountain, and dwell in pretty little round huts made of hewn tree trunks with conical thatch of dhurra stalks. Most of their settlements are rather hamlets than villages...

— Von Hönnel, July 7, 1888

=== Agriculture ===
Beech (1911) noted that the Chok were a "purely agricultural people, cultivating millet and eleusine grain grown in the cold air of the summit and possibly a little tobacco." The "millet [was] grown on the fertile and well watered flats at the base of the Elgeyo escarpment, and [was] watered by means of irrigation, while eleusine grain (was) grown high upon the hill sides and was dependent on rain". The irrigation system as Beech noted, "is most ingenious, and its original construction must have required a vast amount of toil and patience". MacDonald who came across an agricultural 'Suk' village during the last decade of the nineteenth century described a similar subsistence pattern.

...The section of the Suk people we had now met...build their huts and small hamlets, high up on the hillsides...many beautiful streams issue from the hills and find their way out onto the plains below...The Suk by means of skillful irrigation channels, utilize these streams for watering their fields at the base of the hills, where at times large areas of grain are seen under cultivation. Flocks of goats and sheep are brought down during the day time from their mountain fastness, to graze along the banks of the many streams...

— MacDonald, 1892

This way of life was captured in family traditions of a Pokot man named Dounguria.

When my father was young, he and his family enjoyed the many blessings of Pokot life on Cheptulel mountain. Their log-terraced gardens, irrigated by the carved “bridge of water” leading from the cool mountain streams, always produced enough grain to supplement the milk, blood and meat of their large herd of cattle and goats. But when father became a youth like me, a great epidemic suddenly destroyed most of the herds, and even wild animals, throughout the land. This was The Time the Country Became Dark.

— Domonguria

=== Industries ===
The Chok had two notable industries, pottery and iron-smithing, the former performed by women and the latter by men.

The significance of the Chok smithing industry is illustrated in a tradition captured among the Nandi in the early 20th century. There the Uasin Gishu smiths said in regard to their ancestors arrival in Nandi; that a man named Arap Sutek had been the only smith in the country then but that after the Uasin Gishu Maasai quit their homes and split up in different directions, some of those who wandered into Nandi were hospitably received by Arap Sutek and by the early 20th century every clan had a smith.

There was also a sword in use among the Nandi by then known as rotuet-ap-chok (sword of/from Chok) which was being manufactured alongside the previous rotuet that had been made in Nandi. It is possible though not clear that the Chok had exported these weapons prior to this time.

=== Trade ===
The Chok obtained donkeys from the Turkana and it would appear they took a number with them to Nandi but were obliged to get rid of them as it was felt that they would spoil the grazing for cattle.

== Culture ==
The most noted item of their culture was the Chok from which they got their name. Beech notes that as of 1911 it was only women he saw carrying these swords "...on their way to the grain fields".

=== Marriage ===
A custom unique to the Chok was the payment of dowry in palm wine or honey.

== External relations ==
=== Loikop people ===
Samburu traditions describe their relationship with the Pokot as one of inter-ethnic lang'ata i.e. a close yet circumspect bond best perceived as a friendship born as a resolution to past conflict.

The Samburu place the oath beyond living memory, and with many knowledgeable Samburu informants giving detailed oral history going back to at least the 1880s it is likely that this relationship was established with the Chok.

Certain traditions state that the oath was renewed around the time when the Merisho age-set were murran (in the early 1900s) indicating a renewal of the oath following the assimilation of the Chok into Pokot identity.

== Decline ==
The Chok were raided by the Laikipia Masai forcing some of them to flee to Kapukogh in Uganda.

== Dispersal ==
=== Uasin Gishu Maasai ===
The Nandi smiths narrative identifies their ancestors who arrived from the Uasin Gishu plateau with a sword known as rotuet-ap-chok (sword of/from Chok) as the Uasin Gishu Maasai. Similarly immigrants from their neighboring community (i.e. the Sekker mentioned by the Pokot elders) were known as the Segelai Maasai.

== Assimilation & Expansion ==
Chok traditions recall their territorial expansion under their new identity, they remember that a time came when "... there arose a wizard among the Suk who prepared a charm in the form of a stick, which he placed in the Loikop cattle kraals, with the result that they all died."

After defeating the Loikop, a settlement was established at En-ginyang (about 48 kilometers north of Lake Baringo), likely by a group of Pokotozek. This event signified the establishment of the pastoral Chok, i.e. Pokot, community.

With the Pokot community established, a desire arose many Chok to adopt pastoralist culture. The aim and ambition of every agricultural Chok became to amass enough cattle to move into the Kerio Valley and join their pastoral kin. They achieved this through attaining cattle as the bride-price of their female relations or through adoption, in the latter case, poor Chok youth would be adopted by members of the emerging Pokot community primarily as herds-boys.

By the early 20th century, the Pokot community was expanding as many of the Chok joined their rank and by that time, many Pokot who were termed Suk by the colonial administrators did not recognize this name for their tribe.
