= Napak =

- Map of Uganda showing the location of Napak
- Coordinates: 02°06′56″N 34°13′36″E
- Country: Uganda
- Region: Northern Uganda
- Sub-region: Karamoja Sub-region
- District: Napak District
- Elevation: 1,200 m (3,900 ft)

Population (2014 census)
  - Total: 5,278
- Time zone: UTC+3 (EAT)

Napak is a town in Northern Uganda. It is the commercial, administrative and municipal headquarters of Napak District. The district is named after the town.

== Location ==
The town is situated approximately 80 kilometres (50 mi), southwest of Moroto, the largest town in Karamoja sub-region. Napak lies approximately 340 kilometres (210 mi), by road, northeast of Kampala, the capital of Uganda and the largest city in that country. The approximate coordinates of Napak are: 2°06'56.0"N 34°13'36.0"E (Latitude:2.115556; Longitude:34.226670).

== Population ==
During the national census and household survey of 27 and 28 August 2014, the Uganda Bureau of Statistics (UBOS), enumerated the population of Napak Town Council at 5,278 people.

== Points of interest ==
The following points of interest lie within the town limits or close to the edges of town: (a) The offices of Napak Town Council (b) The headquarters of Napak District Administration (c) Napak Central Market and (d) the Soroti–Katakwi–Moroto–Lokitanyala Road which passes through Napak town in a general south to north direction.

== See also ==
- Napak District
- Karamoja sub-region
- Northern Region, Uganda
