= Matheniko Wildlife Reserve =

Conservation area in Uganda

- IUCN category IV (habitat/species management area)
- Location within Uganda
- Location: Moroto DistrictUganda
- Nearest city: Mbale
- Coordinates: 2°55′N 34°30′E
- Area: 1,520 square kilometres (590 sq mi)
- Governing body: Uganda Wildlife Authority

The Matheniko Wildlife Reserve is a conservation area in the Karamoja subregion of northeastern Uganda. It is the fifth most-threatened conservation protected area in Uganda.

== Location ==
Matheniko is a part of the corridor of protected areas in Karamoja that stretches from Kidepo National Park down through Bokora and Pian Upe Wildlife Reserves. The Reserve's northeastern boundary is also the Uganda-Kenya border.

== Geology ==
The elevation of the Reserve is between 1,070 and 1,830 metres (3,510 and 6,000 ft).

== Climate ==
Matheniko falls into the Somalia-Masai ecoregion of semi-desert grassland and shrubland. Average annual rainfall in the Reserve is 670 millimetres (26 in), with peaks in April–May and in November.

== Tourism ==
The Uganda Wildlife Authority is actively working to develop Matheniko's tourism infrastructure. As of February 2012 it seeking bidders to construct a six roomed Guest House there.
