= Mount Napak =

Extinct volcano in Napak District, Uganda

Coordinates: 2°4′42″N 34°18′11″E

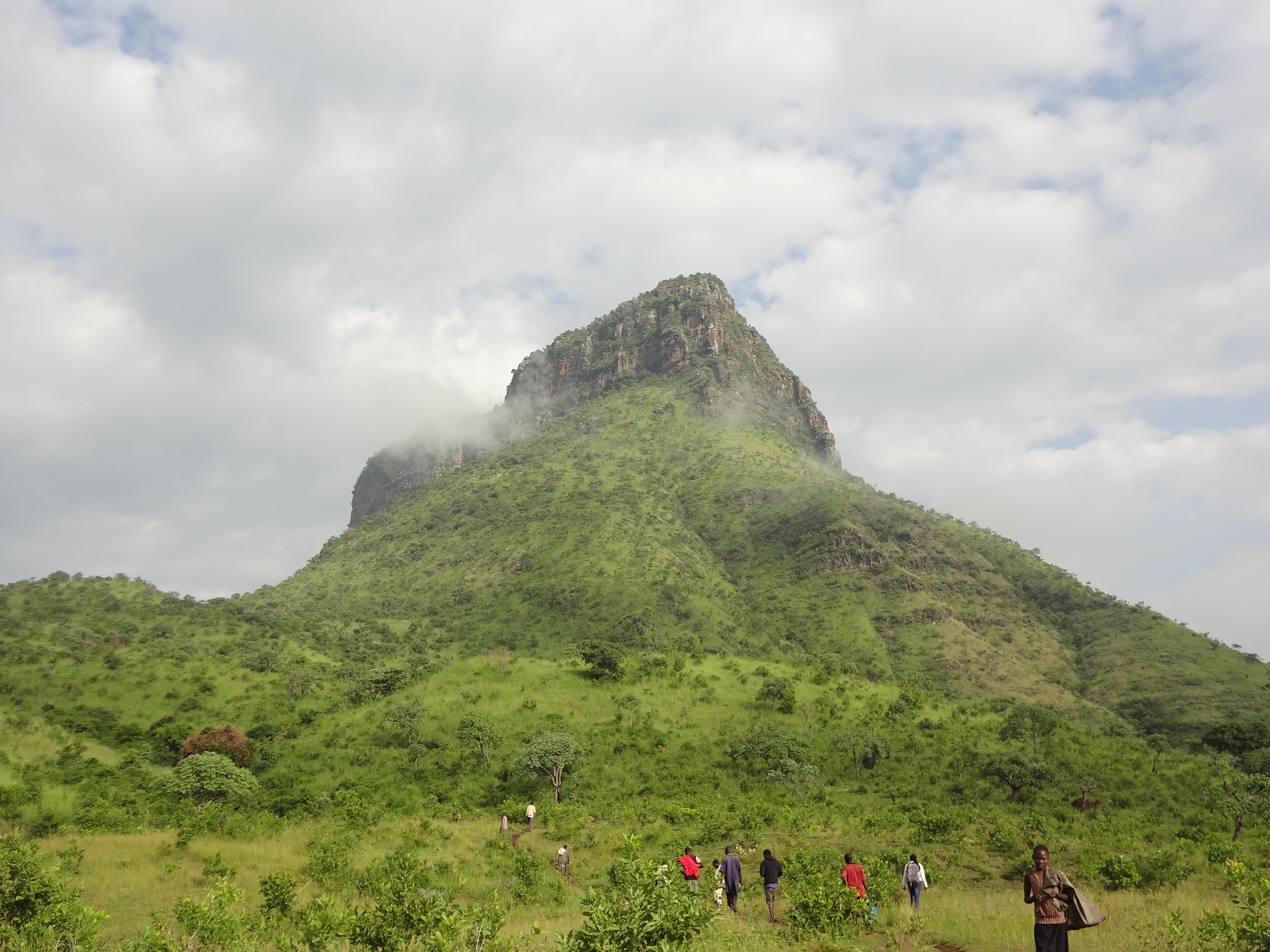
Mount Napak

Mount Napak is an extinct volcano in the Napak District of Uganda. Located on the northern edge of the Bokora Game Reserve, it reaches an estimated height of 2103m above sea level. An alkaline volcano which erupted carbonatite-nephelinite material during the Early Miocene on the margin of the Great Rift Valley, subsequent erosion affords volcanologists an opportunity to inspect its once internal structures. Moreover, volcanic ash deposits and paleosols preserve a range of both animal and plant fossils, significantly including numerous primate taxa.

== IUGS geological heritage site ==
In respect of it being 'one of the richest universal sources of early Miocene well-preserved primates associated with an amazing fossil fauna and flora', the International Union of Geological Sciences (IUGS) included the 'Miocene primates paleontological site of Napak' in its assemblage of 100 'geological heritage sites' around the world in a listing published in October 2022. The organisation defines an IUGS Geological Heritage Site as 'a key place with geological elements and/or processes of international scientific relevance, used as a reference, and/or with a substantial contribution to the development of geological sciences through history.'
