= Siger people =

The Siger people were a community commonly spoken of in the folklore of a number of Kenyan communities that inhabited regions of northwestern Kenya at various points in history.

== Etymology ==
Following his Juba expedition, MacDonald (1899) noted of the 'Senguer' who previously 'dwelt on the Guash Ngishu plateau' stating that 'As "l" and "r" are interchangeable, "Senguer" of the Juba expedition is evidently the same word as "Jangwel", a term which Mr. C. Hobley found was applied by the Nandi to designate their tribe".

== Origins ==
The earliest reference to the Siger community in Kenyan oral literature comes from the Turkana community. According to Turkana traditions captured by Emley (1927), the 'Nithir' were one of two Ateker forces that carried out the migration to Turkwel. The name 'Nithir' was said to derive from the word 'ithiger' which he noted was an ornament.

At Turkwel, the Nithir section is said to have divided into two sections. One kept the 'Nithir' name while the other came to be known as 'Nibelai'.

Three communities are thus portrayed as emerging from the separation. The Ngamatak who were the other primary branch, remained on the west bank of the Turkwel river under a leader named Iling'anyang. The Nithir under a leader named Luguyin moved eastwards from their base while the Nibelai, moved southwards under two leaders Nakoritha and Loliokoli

=== Assimilation ===
Lamphear (1988) also recorded Turkana origin traditions. These traditions give the image of an assimilation and also portray three population groupings emerging from the settlement. Two major groups referred to as 'Curo and Monia' are portrayed as having remained on at the original home, taking on a common name 'Turkana'. Several clans are said to have absorbed some far-ranging contingents of Bantu-speaking Meru. It is also stated some settlers abandoned the Tarash to move south to the area beyond Mount Elgon

== Territory ==
At its largest extent, Siger territory covered the northern parts of Uasin Gishu, as well as parts of Elgeyo-Marakwet, Trans Nzoia and a southern section of West Pokot;

...Commences from Kiporoom River in Uasin Gishu District. It extends along Kapsumbeywet river through Ziwa (Sirikwa) centre, Moiben Posta and Kose hills in Uasin Gishu. From Kose hills it goes down to join Moiben river. The boundary goes up river Moiben to the confluence of Ko’ngipsebe and Kimowo streams. It turns eastwards to cover areas of Maron sub-location in Emboput location in Marakwet District. Turning to the west it then goes to Kamolokon along Marakwet/West Pokot and Marakwet boundary. From here it drops to Sebit, Somor, then to Kongelai and up along Swom river. From Swom river to the confluence of Swom and Cheptenden river. From Cheptenden river to the confluence of Cheptenden river and Moiben river where these two rivers confluence with Kiboorom.

— Sengwer chief Arap Kamussein before the Kenya Land Commission on 2nd October 1932

=== Neighbors ===
To the east; the Siger shared the plateau with the Chok (Chuk/Suk) people, a state of affairs that appears to have been established for some time. As Beech (1911) noted, the old men of Suk were unanimous in declaring "that there always were two original Suk tribes living on the Elgeyo escarpment. The names of these two tribes were Chok or Chuk which is the name for a short sword like implement, and Sekker which means 'cowrie shells'."

To the north and west, the Siger were bordered by the Oropom and the Ateker communities, the reformation of some of these into Turkana would have significant consequences for the Siger. The southern borders, then consisting of the densely forested Nandi plateaux was at the time occupied by Akiek.

== Way of life ==
=== Pastoralism ===
The Siger herded a distinctive type of long-horned black cattle, postulated by Lamphear (1988) as being a cervicothoracic-humped Sanga crossbreed.

=== Clans ===
During this period, social groupings similar in concept to clans seem to have played a role in the social organisation of the Siger. One of these 'clans' was known as the Kacepkai. This clan was displaced during the Turkana invasion of Moru Assiger and were said to have become the diviners of a number of different peoples in the Mt. Elgon region.

=== Divination ===
The Siger are credited with great mystical abilities and divination appears to have played a large role in their culture. The confederacy gave rise to the Meturona line of diviners among the Turkana, the Kachepkai diviners of the Pokot and the Talai diviners of the Uas Nkishu Maasai, the Nandi and Kipsigis.

=== Arts & crafts ===
The most notable element of Siger culture was an adornment of a single cowrie shell attached to the forelock of Siger women, a hairstyle that was also common to the Oropom who neighbored them to the west and north-west. This dangling cowrie shell was referred to as esigirait, pl. ngisigira and it is from this cultural feature that the Sengwer are said to have derived their name.

== c.1830 ==
According to Turkana traditions recorded by Lamphear, the Siger identity was annihilated by a variety of factors related to the Aoyate drought.

=== Famine ===
The long-horned cattle that the Siger kept died in huge numbers during the Aoyate drought. The drought decimated the Siger herds and the community disintegrated. Many famine refugees who tried to push eastwards died of starvation near Moru Eris though some found refuge with the Dassanetch, Pokot and Karimojong.

== Uasin Gishu Ngishu - Siger war ==
=== Historicity ===
According to Maasai tradition, the Uasin Gishu front conquered a group of people who occupied the Uasin Gishu plateau, this community is remembered as Senguer. Other Maasai traditions concur with this assertion, noting that the Loosekelai (i.e. Sigerai/Siger) were attacked by an alliance of the Uasin Gishu and Siria communities.

In further concurrence with Maasai traditions, are macro-Kalenjin traditions such as the popular narrative of origin recorded by Chesaina (1991). In it is stated that the Kipsigis, Nandi and Tugen split following a series of misfortunes, notably drought and attacks by the Uasin Gishu Maasai. The Tapkendi tale has also been widely quoted to illustrate past occupation of the Uasin Gishu plateau by the Nandi, specifically, the introduction which reads "At a time when the Masai occupied some of the Nandi grazing grounds". It is presumed that this was the Uasin Gishu plateau and that Nandi place names on the plateau were superseded by Maasai names. This is evinced by certain "Masai place-names in eastern Nandi (i.e Uasin Gishu border) which indicate that the Masai had temporary possession of strip of Nandi roughly five miles wide", these include Ndalat, Lolkeringeti, Nduele and Ol-lesos, which were by the early nineteenth century in use by the Nandi as koret (district) names.

However, micro-Kalenjin traditions would appear to turn this narrative on its head. They concur on key points, notably an incoming population and an enfeebled population (in some cases known as Segelai) holding out in what were then dense forests around the plateau. The key difference is that the Kalenjin communities as seen as the incomers.

Kipsigis traditions such as those recorded by Orchadson (1927), state that at a time when the Kipsigis and Nandi were a united identity, they moved southwards through country occupied by 'Masai'. Orchadson notes that this was "probably the present Uasin Gishu country". Here, they accidentally got split in two by a wedge of Masai who Orchadson records as being "Uasin Gishu (Masai) living in Kipchoriat (Nyando) valley". Accounts from Hollis however refer to a "branch called 'L-osigella or Segelli [who] took refuge in the Nyando valley but were wiped out by the Nandi and Lumbwa...It was from them that the Nandi obtained their system of rule by medicine-men.

The totality of both narratives are however in congruence with the large scale movement of pastoralists from the plains into the forested areas, assimilation of forest-dwelling communities and wide-spread identity shift. A widespread trend across the region as the Mutai of the 19th-century dragged on.

=== Loss of Uasin Gishu and Mau ===
According to Kalenjin and Maasai traditions, the territory of the Uasin Gishu people extended over the Uasin Gishu and Mau plateaus following the conquest of these regions from the Siger. This period also saw the fragmentation of Loikop society.

== c. 1850 ==
=== Kipsigis & Nandi identity ===
No date is given for the Kipsigis and Nandi fracture which would be contemporaneous with the dates of establishment of these identities. However, Dobbs (1910) made notes on the initiation age-sets of the Lumbwa. He noted that the oldest age-set he could get notes on were the Maina who were initiated around 1856. None of this age-set or the following were alive at the time. He noted that the oldest interviewees and indeed the oldest Lumwba individuals at the time were between 64–67 years. He noted that they had been initiated in 1866 when they were about twelve to fifteen years old.

In spite of the oldest interviewees being alive at the time of the Maina initiations, Dobbs notes that "Although I made the most careful inquiries, I could find out nothing whatever about any circumcision age prior to 'Maina' (1856)".

== Diaspora ==
=== Nandi ===
The second Lumbwa stream of clans consisted of the Tungo, Kipaa, Kipasiso and Kapchemuri (Chemuri) as well as Elgoni (Koni).

Certain peculiarities recorded about these clans may point to skills that they brought with them. For instance, by the late 19th and early 20th centuries, the Kipasiso were highly sought out and "engaged to erect the korosiot sticks at weddings". This clan was thus perceived and possibly possessed some form of knowledge surrounding wedding rituals. The Tungo at the same time, were "held in high esteem, and one of their number is selected as a judge or umpire in all disputes". This clan might thus have been perceived or displayed characteristics of sober mindedness or perhaps a prior knowledge of a superior (i.e. in relation to perceived justice) set of laws.

=== Sengwer ===
Small numbers of Sengwer retreated into the forests and into small enclaves among the emerging Marakwet society where they retained elements of their identity. The Maasai coined a derogatory term for the Sengwer after they lost their cattle.

...We were robbed of our cattle by the Karamojong and then the Maasai laughed at us because we had no cattle, and called us Cherangany...

— District Commissioner Elgeiyo/Marakwet, Tambach, Report dated 11th October 1927
