= Napak District =

- District
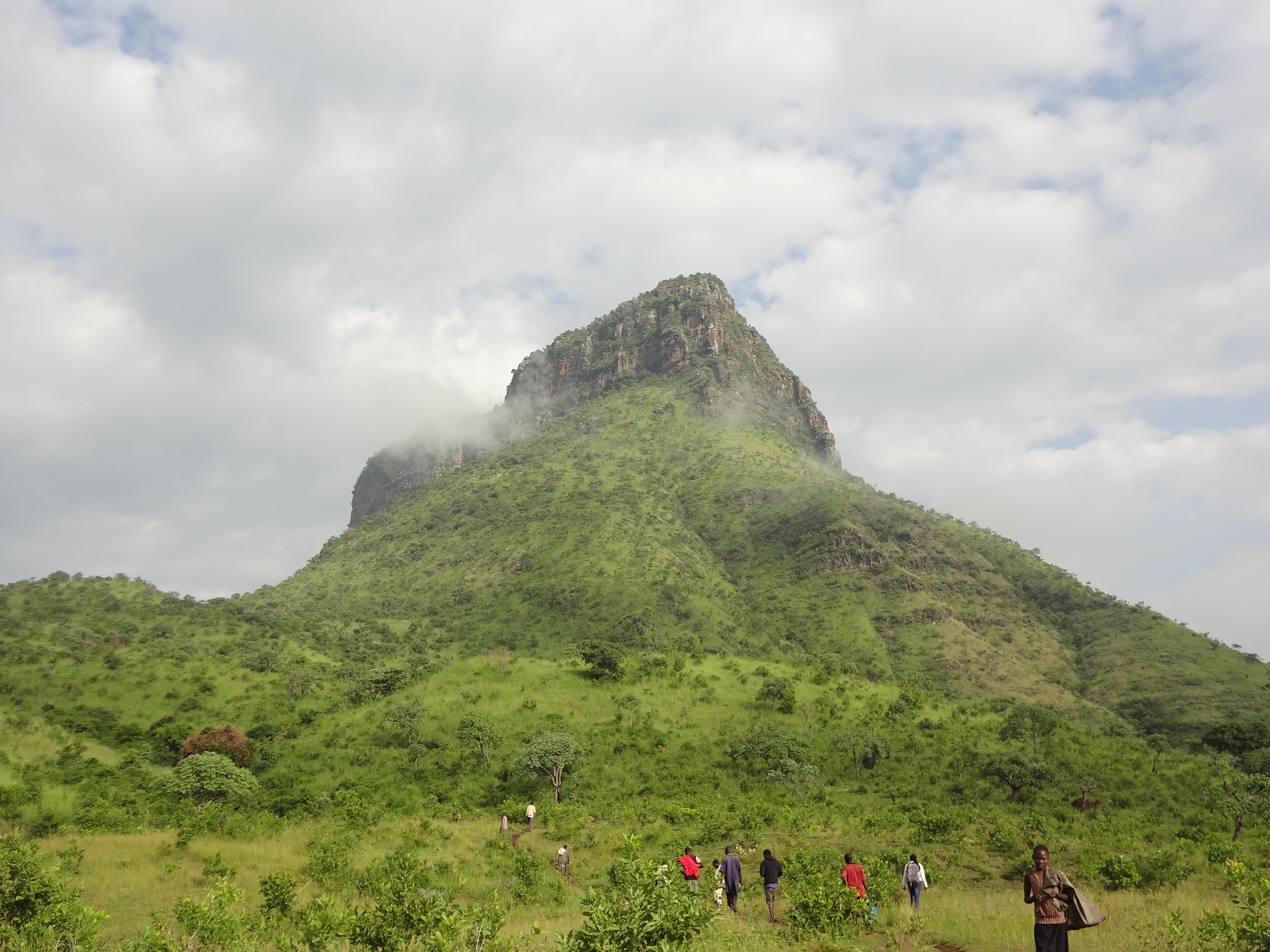
- Mountain in Napak District

- District location in Uganda
- Coordinates: 02°12′N 34°18′E
- Country: Uganda
- Region: Northern Uganda
- Sub-region: Karamoja sub-region
- Capital: Napak

Area
  - Total: 4,978.4 km^{2} (1,922.2 sq mi)
- Elevation: 1,500 m (4,900 ft)

Population (2012 Estimate)
  - Total: 197,700
  - Density: 39.7/km^{2} (103/sq mi)
- Time zone: UTC+3 (EAT)
- Website: www.napak.go.ug

Napak District is a district in Northern Uganda. It is named after Mount Napak, and its headquarters is at Lokitede.

== Location ==
Napak District is located geographically in Northeastern Uganda, in the Karamoja sub-region, Northern Uganda. It is bordered by Abim District to the northwest, Kotido District to the north, Moroto District to the northeast and east, Nakapiripirit District to the southeast, Katakwi District to the south, Amuria District to the southwest and Otuke District to the west. The district headquarters at Napak are located approximately 80 kilometres (50 mi), by road, southwest of Moroto, the largest town in the sub-region. This location lies about 340 kilometres (210 mi), by road, northeast of Kampala, the capital of Uganda and the largest city in that country. The district coordinates are:02 12N, 34 18E.

== Overview ==
Napak District was carved out of Moroto District in 2010. The district is administered by Napak District Administration, with Napak, as the district headquarters. Napak District is part of the Karamoja sub-region. Karamoja includes the following districts: 1. Abim District 2. Amudat District 3. Kaabong District 4. Kotido District 5. Moroto District 6. Nakapiripirit District 7. Napak District. According to the national census of 2002, the sub-reguion was home to an estimated 800,000 people at that time.

== Population ==
The 1991 national population census estimated the district population at about 37,700. The 2002 census estimated the population of the district at 112,700. In 2012, the district population was estimated at 197,700. In 2012, the population of Napak District was estimated at approximately 197,700.

== See also ==
- Napak
- Karamoja sub-region
- Northern Region, Uganda
- Districts of Uganda
