= Northern Region, Uganda =

Region of Uganda

Northern
- Region
- Coordinates: 02°47′N 032°18′E
- Country: Uganda
- Region: Northern
- Regional capital: Gulu

Area
  - Total: 85,391.7 km^{2} (32,969.9 sq mi)
- Elevation: 1,078 m (3,537 ft)

Population (2014 census)
  - Total: 7,188,139
  - Estimate (2011): 7,620,700
  - Density: 84.1784/km^{2} (218.021/sq mi)
- Time zone: UTC+3 (EAT)
- HDI (2021): 0.473 low · 4th

The Northern Region is one of four regions in Uganda. As of Uganda's 2014 census, the region's population was 7,188,139.

== Districts ==
As of 2010, the Northern Region had 30 districts:

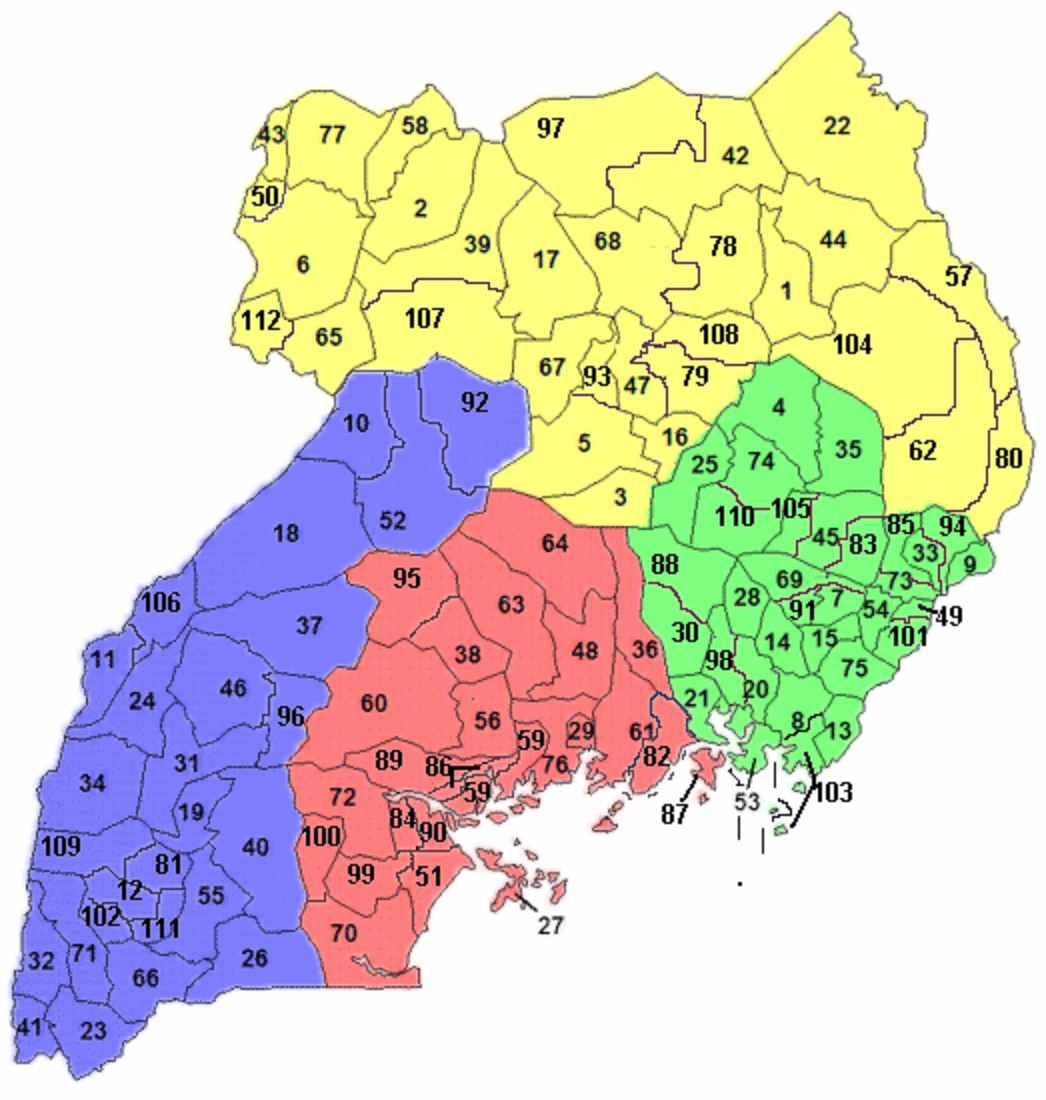
Northern region in yellow.

District	Population (Census 1991)	Population (Census 2002)	Population (Census 2014)	Map	Chief town
Abim	47,572	51,903	107,966	1	Abim
Adjumani	96,264	202,290	225,251	2	Adjumani
Agago	100,659	184,018	227,792	78	Agago
Alebtong	112,584	163,047	227,541	79	Alebtong
Amolatar	68,473	96,189	147,166	3	Amolatar
Amudat	11,336	63,572	105,767	80	Amudat
Amuru	88,692	135,723	186,696	39	Amuru
Apac	162,192	249,656	368,626	5	Apac
Arua	368,214	559,075	782,077	6	Arua
Dokolo	84,978	129,385	183,093	16	Dokolo
Gulu	211,788	298,527	436,345	17	Gulu
Kaabong	91,236	202,757	167,879	22	Kaabong
Kitgum	104,557	167,030	204,048	42	Kitgum
Koboko	62,337	129,148	206,495	43	Koboko
Kole	115,259	165,922	239,327	93	Kole
Kotido	57,198	122,442	181,050	44	Kotido
Lamwo	71,030	115,345	134,379	97	Lamwo
Lira	191,473	290,601	408,043	47	Lira
Maracha	107,596	145,705	186,134	50	Maracha
Moroto	59,149	77,243	103,432	57	Moroto
Moyo	79,381	194,778	139,012	58	Moyo
Nakapiripirit	66,248	90,922	156,690	62	Nakapiripirit
Napak	37,684	112,697	142,224	104	Napak
Nebbi	185,551	266,312	396,794	65	Nebbi
Nwoya	37,947	41,010	133,506	107	Nwoya
Otuke	43,457	62,018	104,254	108	Otuke
Oyam	177,053	268,415	383,644	67	Oyam
Pader	80,938	142,320	178,004	68	Pader
Yumbe	99,794	251,784	484,822	77	Yumbe
Zombo	131,315	169,048	240,082	112	Zombo
Total	3,151,955	5,148,882	7,188,139	-	Gulu
