= Aoyate drought =

Drought in Kenya

The Aoyate drought was an acute meteorological drought that according to Turkana tradition affected much of the Rift Valley region of Kenya during the late 18th century or early 19th century.

The various narratives, records and reports point to a long dry period which started c. 1800. It seemingly peaked with an intensely arid time during the mid-1830s. This would be congruent with Krapf's (1860) mention of a "great famine of 1836". In the nearby region of Ethiopia, there were reports of major famines in both 1829 and 1835.

== Naming ==
The word aoyate is from the Turkana language and means long dry time. It is the word that the Turkana use to describe this dry period in their history.

== Periodization ==
Lamphear (1988) noted that chronological reckonings based on the Turkana age-set system suggested a date in the late eighteenth or early nineteenth centuries. He notes that concurrent drought traditions suggested in the chronological reconstruction of neighboring communities indicates that the drought affected much of the Rift Valley region.

Records of Nile River flood stages date back to the 7th century AD and an analysis of the flood patterns and comparison with water levels in Lake Chad revealed a correlation between high Nile discharge and greater rainfall in equatorial East Africa. The analysis of Nile flood stages indicates a 'Minor Low' for the period 1800 to 1830, this was preceded by a 'Minor High' during the years 1725 to 1800 and was followed by a 'Minor High' which lasted between 1830 and 1870.

Studies in Ethiopia by Pankhurst indicated major famines in 1880–1881, 1835 and in 1829. These studies are significant in that the country of Ethiopia borders present-day Turkana county. Meanwhile, Samburu historians interviewed by Straight et al. (2016) state that the Samburu separated from a society known as Burkineji in the wake of the 1830s Mutai. According to a Samburu Laibon interviewed by Fratkin (2011), the Sambur 'Il Kipkeku' age-set were warriors during the period c.1837-1851.

The various narratives, records and reports thus point to a long dry period starting about 1800 seemingly peaking with an intensely arid time during the mid-1830s. This would be congruent with Krapf's (1860) mention of a "great famine of 1836".

== Prelude ==
There are a number of oral traditions from various communities across much of southern Africa that point to the region having experienced declining rainfall levels from about 1800 to about 1830. This saw the progressive desiccation of lakes, rivers and springs, a phenomenon observed by an employee of the East India Company in the 1820s who noted;

...in many parts of the interior of the country the springs and rivulets are drying up and annual rains become more scanty and irregular. The traveler often meets with houses and farms that have been deserted by their owners on account of a permanent failure in the supply of water which they once enjoyed.

— Quoted in Clifton Crais, Poverty, War, and Violence in South Africa

== Effects of the drought ==
=== Diminished carrying capacity for livestock ===
The drought decimated the herds of the Chemwal, thought to have been cervicothoraic-humped Sanga crossbreeds, leading to the disintegration of the community.

=== Famine ===
Sengwer folklore has it that, "It became dry and there was great hunger. The Siger went away to the east to Moru Eris, where most of them died of heat and starvation. So many died that there is still a place there called Kabosan (the rotten place)".

=== War ===
Full-scale war flared up between the Turkana and Chemwal. Bands of Turkana warriors forced some Chemwalin northwards to the head of Lake Turkana where they formed the Inkabelo section of the developing Dassanech community. Other Chemwalin were pushed back onto the Suk hills, to the south to be incorporated by the Chok leading to the rise of the ritually important Kachepkai clan while others yet were assimilated by the Turkana where some became a new clan known simply as Siger. The victorious Turkana took possession of the grazing and water resources of Moru Assiger.

=== Mass migration ===
Other Chemwalin were forced to abandon their highland abodes and fled eastwards where they ran into even drier conditions and a great many died.

== Aftermath ==
The Aoyate destroyed the lives and livelihoods of many inhabitants of the Rift Valley region.
