= Nakapiripirit District =

District in Uganda

- District
- District location in Uganda
- Coordinates: 01°55′N 34°40′E
- Country: Uganda
- Region: Northern Uganda
- Sub-region: Karamoja sub-region
- Established: 1 July 2001
- Capital: Nakapiripirit

Area
  - Total: 4,201.6 km^{2} (1,622.2 sq mi)
- Elevation: 1,300 m (4,300 ft)

Population (2012 Estimate)
  - Total: 161,600
  - Density: 38.5/km^{2} (100/sq mi)
- Time zone: UTC+3 (EAT)
- Website: www.nakapiripirit.go.ug

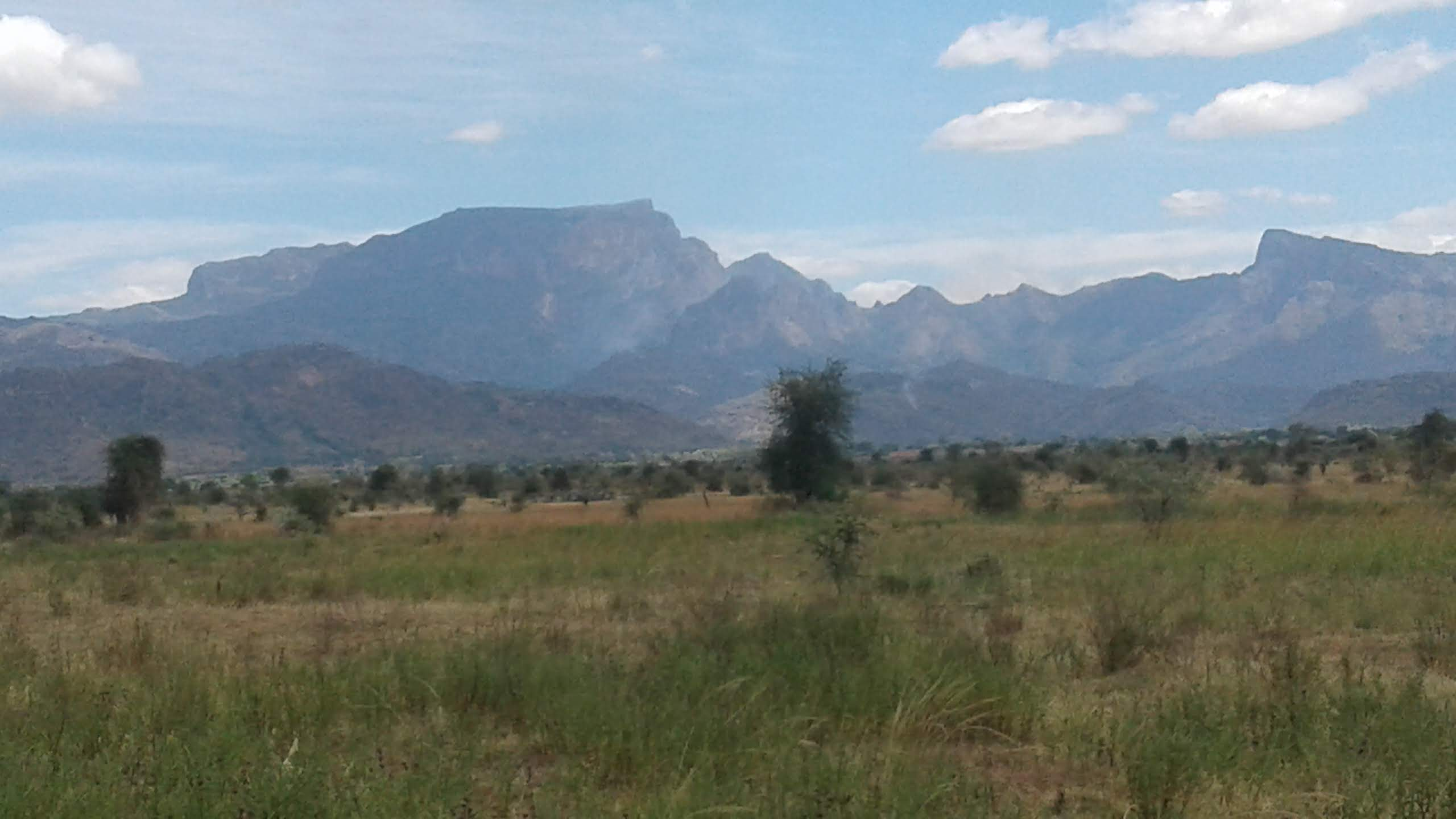
A general view of Nakapiripirit covered by hills and plains

Nakapiripirit District is a district in Northern Uganda. Like many Ugandan districts, it is named after its 'chief town', Nakapiripirit, where the district headquarters are located.

== Location ==
The district is bordered by Napak District to the north, Moroto District to the northeast, Amudat District to the east, Kween District to the southeast, Bulambuli District to the southwest, Kumi District to the west and Katakwi District to the northwest. Nakapiripirit, the main municipal, administrative and commercial center in the district, lies 125 kilometres (78 mi) northeast of Mbale, the nearest large town, and 360 kilometres (220 mi) northeast of Kampala, Uganda's capital and largest city. The coordinates of the district are:01 55N, 34 40E.

== Population ==
The 1991 national population census estimated the district population at about 66,250. In 2002, the national census conducted that year estimated the population of the district at about 90,920. Between 2002 and 2012, it is estimated that the district population has been growing at an annual rate of 6%. In view of those data, it is estimated that in 2012 the population of Nakapiripirit District was about 161,600.

== Ethnicities ==
The majority of the population are Karamojong and the language spoken is the Karamojong language.

== Economic activity ==
The main activity in the district is animal husbandry and the majority of the population are pastoralists. However, in some areas, especially in the south, some agricultural activity takes place. More recently the exploration of the rich mineral landscape has begun in earnest by American, Canadian, Middle Eastern and Indian prospectors.

== Livestocks ==
- Chicken
- Goat
- Sheep
- Pigs
- Cattle
- Turkey

== See also ==
- Nakapiripirit
- Karamoja
- Northern Uganda
- Uganda Districts
