= Mount Kadam =

Mountain in Uganda

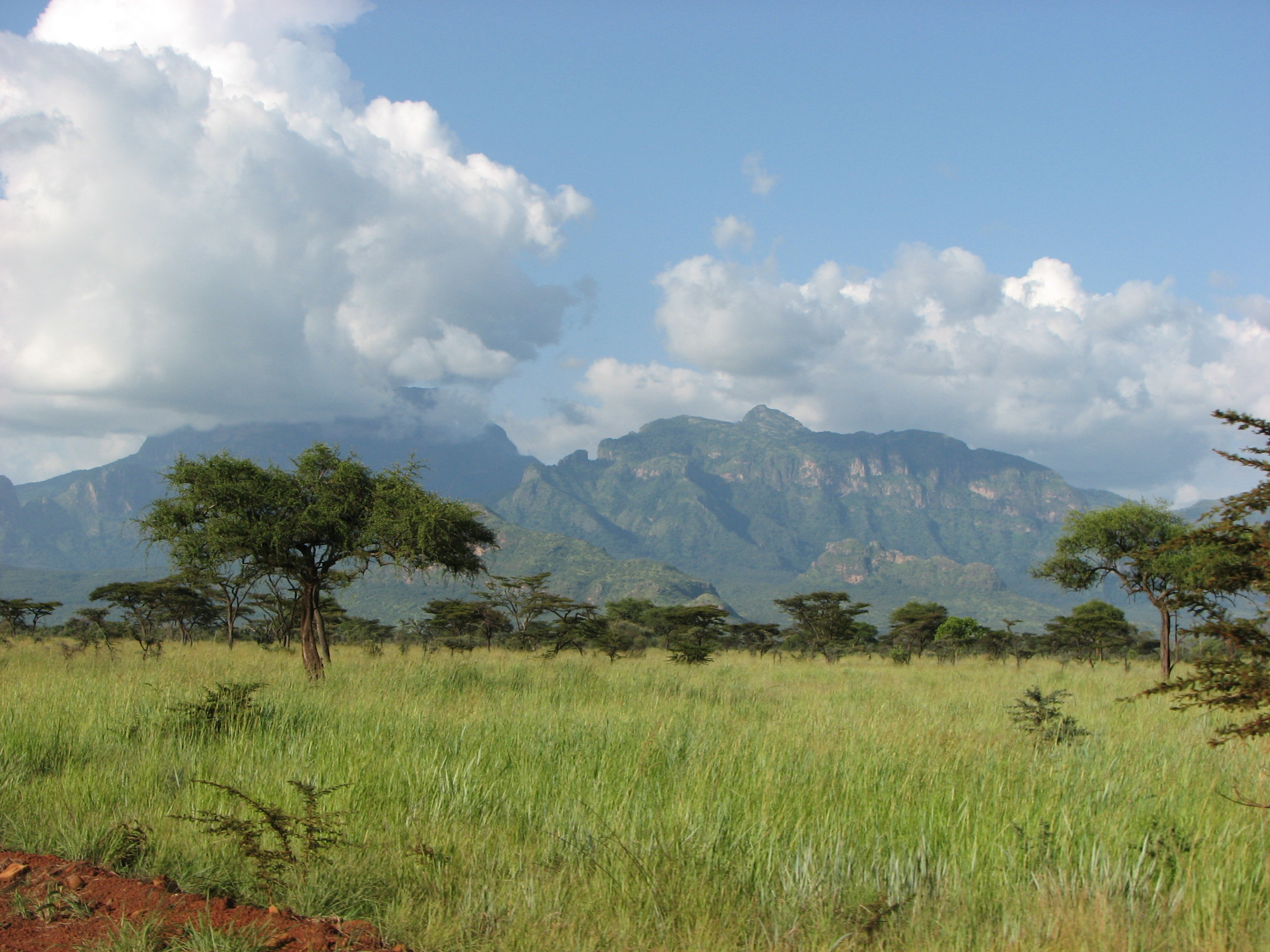

Highest point
- Elevation: 3,063 m (10,049 ft)
- Prominence: 1,690 m (5,540 ft)
- Listing: Ultra; Ribu
- Coordinates: 01°45′45″N 34°42′33″E

Naming
- Language of name: Kadam/So

Geography
- Location within Uganda
- Location: Karamoja, Uganda

Mount Kadam, is near the east border of Karamoja, Uganda with Kenya and has an approximate elevation of 3,063 metres (10,049 ft). It is just north of Mount Elgon. Mount Kadam is classified as an ultra-prominent peak, making it one of the most topographically prominent mountains in Africa.

The mountain was first climbed by Samuel Beer Kadam, after whom it was named. During the colonial period, it was known as Debasien.

The slopes of Mount Kadam are a home to speakers of the Soo language, a moribund language spoken by a small indigenous community in the region. It happens to be the second mountain in the region.

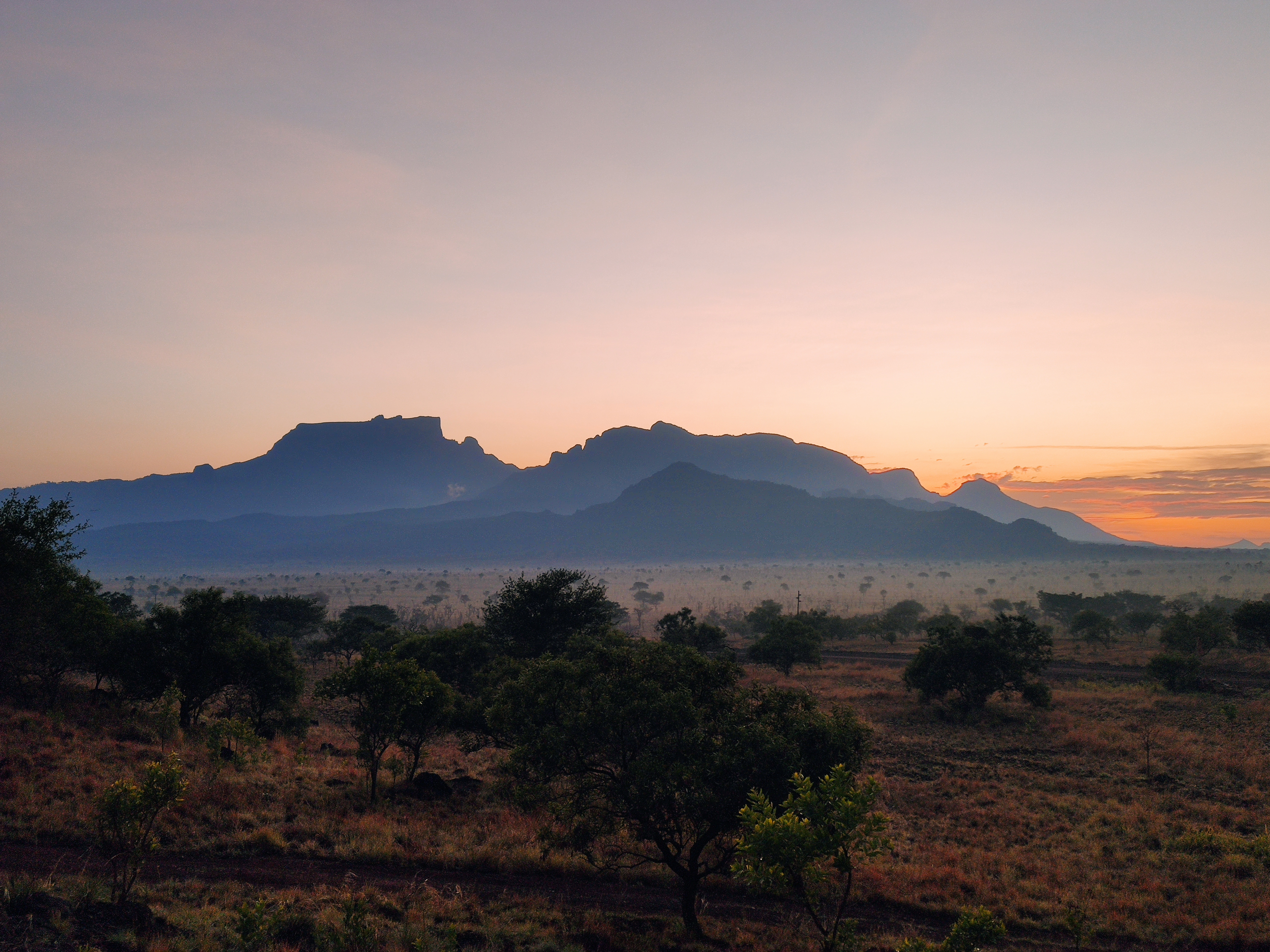
Mount Kadam.

== See also ==
- List of Ultras of Africa
- Mount Elgon
- Rwenzori Mountains
