= Christine Nakwang Tubo =

Ugandan politician (born 1967)

Hon. Christine Nakwang Tubo
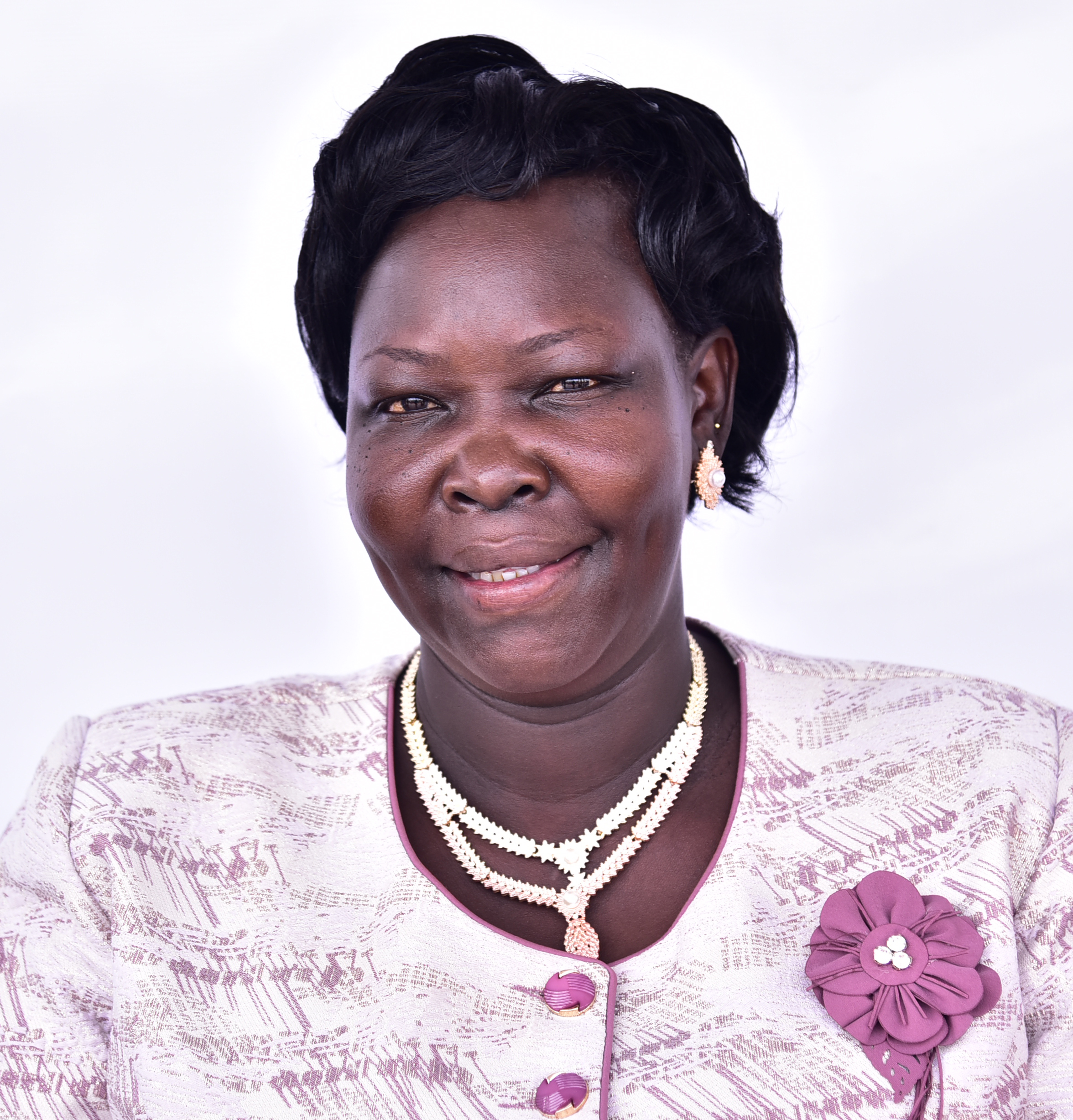

Woman Member of Parliament, Kaabong District
- In office September 2019 – Incumbent

Personal details
- Born: 7 November 1967 (age 58) Kaabong District, Uganda
- Citizenship: Uganda
- Party: National Resistance Movement (NRM)
- Education: Nkumba University; Kampala International University
- Occupation: Politician
- Profession: Accountant, Teacher
- Known for: Advocating for education and health improvements in Kaabong District

Christine Nakwang Tubo (born 7 November 1967) also known as Christine Tubo Nakwang is a Ugandan politician who is currently the woman representative member of parliament for Kaabong District. Christine was among the National Resistance Movement (NRM) representative in the by- elections of 2021 which happened because Rose Lily Akello the former woman representative of Kaabong District opted to represent the newly created Karenga District that was carved out of Kaabong District. She was nominated over Fadouta Ahmed and Agnes Napio who were also under the NRM ticket. Nakwang was competing with Forum for Democratic Change (FDC)'s candidate Judith Adyaka Nalibe who abandoned the race over allegations of limited support from her party. The need to improve Education and health services in Kaabong District has been listed as the key targets of the newly elected member of parliament Christine Tubo Nakwang.

== Early life and education ==
Christine was born on 7 November 1967 in Kaabong District. she is an accountant by profession. She started her education journey at Komukuny Girls for her primary where she attained the Primary Leaving Examinations certificate in 1982, then went to Kangole Girls Secondary School where she attained the U.C.E certificate in 1986. Later, she joined Moroto High school for U.A.C.E in 1989. She joined Nkumba University for higher Diploma in Accounting in 1992. Finally, she went to Kampala International University where she pursued a bachelor's degree in business administration (BBA) in 2006.

== Career ==
Christine started her career as a teacher at Komukuny Girls primary School as well as Kaabong senior Secondary School. She became the Acting Deputy Headmistress at Kangole Girls S.S in 1990, from 1993 to 1994 she was a cashier at Moroto Catholic Procure. In 1995, she became the store keeper of Oxfam GB Kotido Field office, then a treasurer at Dodoth Agro-pastoralist development Organization went further and joined Terra Firma Construction Company as an administrator at the same time serving as the LC5 councilor of Kaabong District from 1996 to 2000. She became a member of parliament for Kaabong District from 2001 to 2011. She became a member at Kaabong District service Commission in 2012–2015 and she again became a member of parliament from September 2019 to date

== Political career ==
Christine started her political journey as the LC5 councilor of Kaabong District from 1996 to 2000. She won the 2006 Elections for the woman representative member of parliament where she had contested as an independent candidate. During the 2006 elections, Akello Lucy Petitioned against Christine in court since she was dissatisfied with the results of the 2006 election. This made Christine to be set aside for a woman member of parliament and a by-election was conducted according to the law and Akello Lucy became the woman Member of parliament of Kaabong District in 2017.When Akello Lucy opted to represent Karenga District, she left a vacant seat and this led to the conducting of By-elections in 2019 where Christine was nominated and she became the woman member of parliament. She further contested for the same position in the recent elections of 2021 as an NRM flag bearer where she emerged as the winner and she served as the woman representative member of Parliament Of Kaabong District.

== See also ==
- Cabinet of Uganda
- Lucy Akello
- List of members of the eleventh Parliament of Uganda
- List of members of the tenth Parliament of Uganda
