= Akiriket =

Akiriket is a traditional cultural male initiation ceremony of boys to adulthood (Rite of Passage) originating from the Karamajong people, an ethnic group of the Nilotic community residing in the northeastern region of Uganda especially in Kotido and Moroto districts. This initiation ceremony form is performed by both men and women, accompanied by melodious songs sung in the native Karamojong language. Akiriket holds significant cultural importance within the community and heritage of the Karamajong people.

== Performance ==
Akiriket is performed with by categorizing age groups to determine their responsibilities and status in society. The ceremony is characterized by cattle sacrifices, oral teaching to pass cultural heritage information and accompanied by traditional attires.

== See also ==
- Edonga
- Culture of Uganda
- Kariamojong
- Nilotic people
