= Rose Lilly Akello =

Ugandan politician (born 1971)

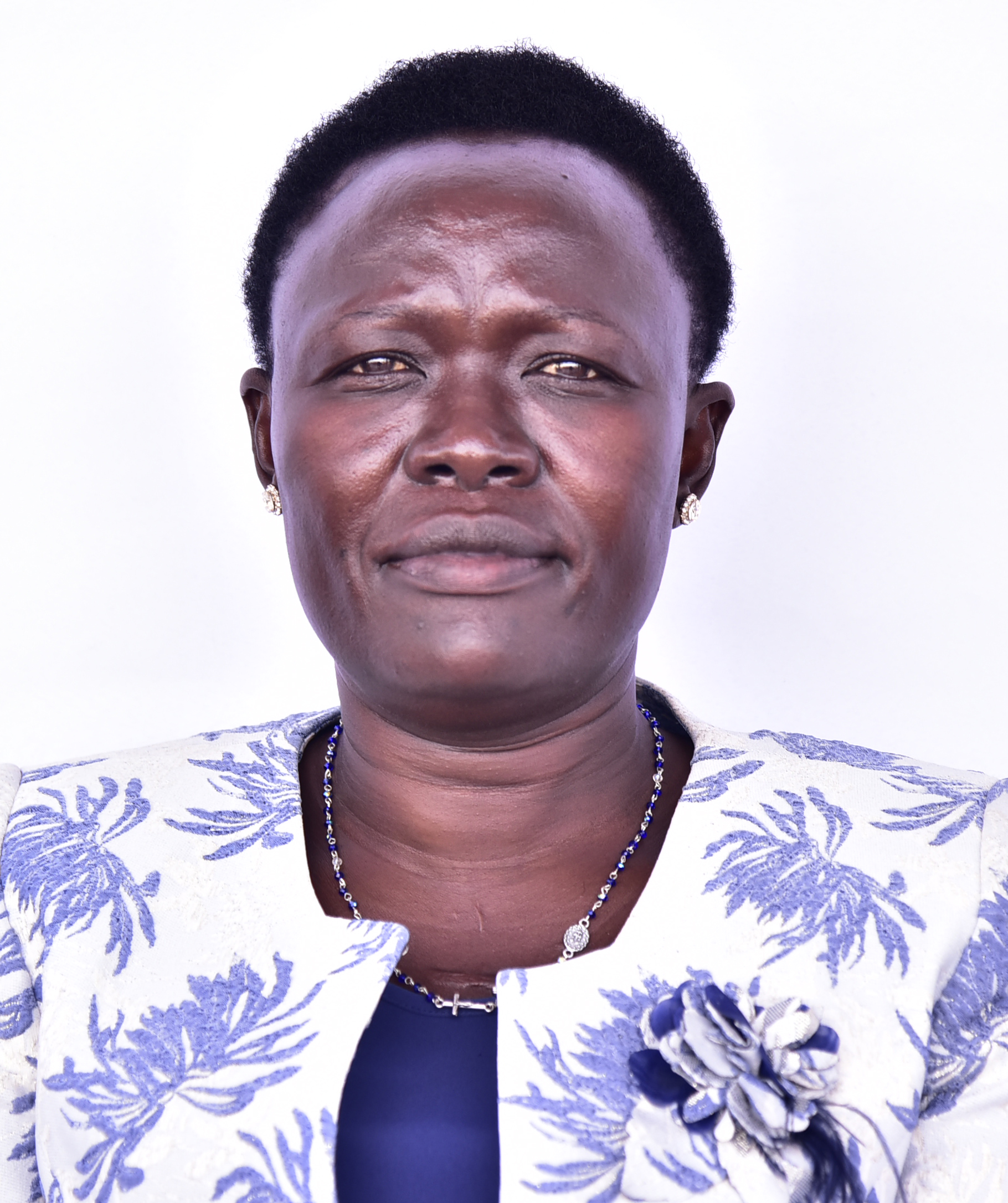
- Born: 23 December 1971 (age 54)
- Citizenship: Ugandan
- Education: Kotido Mixed Primary School; Kangole Girls S.S. Moroto High School; National College of Business Studies, Nakawa; Nsamizi Institute of Social Development; Uganda Martyrs University
- Occupations: Social worker and politician
- Employers: Komukuny Girls Primary School; Kaabong District Service Commission; Karamoja Development Agency, Office of the President; Kotido District Tender Board; Mowoin Women's Group, Kaabong District; Oxfam GB, Kotido Field Office; member of parliament, Kaabong District, and Karenga District
- Known for: Politics
- Political party: National Resistance Movement (NRM)

Rose Lilly Akello (born 23 December 1971) is a Ugandan politician and social worker representing Karenga District as the district woman member of parliament in the eleventh parliament of Uganda. In the ninth and tenth parliament, she served as the district woman member of parliament representing Kaabong District. Rose opted to represent Karenga District instead of Kaabong district because Karenga was carved out of Kaabong on 1 July 2019. She became the Kaabong District Woman MP after winning a by-election in 2017 against Ms Christine Tubo Nakwang. She is affiliated to the ruling political party, NRM.

== Early life and education ==
Akello was born on born 23 December 1971. She completed her Primary Leaving Examinations from Kotido Mixed Primary School in 1986. She attained her Uganda Certificate of Education from Kangole Girls S.S. in 1990. She later joined Moroto High School and completed Uganda Advanced Certificate of Education in 1993. She got a diploma in Hotel Management Studies in 1996 from National College of Business Studies, Nakawa. In 2004, she also completed a diploma in Social Work and Social Administration from Nsamizi Institute of Social Development. In 2013, she obtained Bachelor of Democracy and Development Studies from Uganda Martyrs University. Rose was admitted for a Certificate in Political Science and Administration in China and completed it in 2014.

== Career ==
Between 1993 and 1994, Akello worked as a teacher Komukuny Girls Primary School. From 2000 to 2010, she served as a member of Kaabong District Service Commission. From 1995 to 2002, she worked at Karamoja Development Agency, Office of the President as the Senior Stores Assistant. She also served as a member at Kotido District Tender Board between 2002 and 2005. From 2003 to date, she serves as the director of Mowoin Women's Group, Kaabong District. In 2007, she was employed as the Project Assistant of Oxfam GB, Kotido Field Office.

== Political career ==
From 2011 to date, Rose as served as the member of parliament, Kaabong District, and Karenga District.

== Personal life ==
She is married. Rose's hobbies are social mobilization, counselling, reading, playing netball, listening to gospel music, environmental conservation, and dispute settlement.

== See also ==
- List of members of the ninth Parliament of Uganda
- List of members of the tenth Parliament of Uganda
- List of members of the eleventh Parliament of Uganda
