= St. Mary's Seminary, Nadiket =

Catholic minor seminary in Uganda

Saint Mary's Seminary Nadiket, or more simply Nadiket Seminary, is a Catholic minor seminary located about 3 km (1.9 mi) from Moroto Town on the Moroto-Kitale road in Uganda. It trains young men from the dioceses of Kotido and Moroto for the Catholic priesthood

Its foundation dates back to 1967 when the first Bishop of Moroto, Msgr. Sisto Mazzoldi, M.C.C.I., saw a need to train local priests for the young diocese, which covered the whole Karamoja region. Students came from Namaalu to Karenga. Several of the Karamojong Catholic priests went through this institution, including Fr. Simon Lokodo of Karenga-Kapedo, later a member of the Uganda Parliament, Fr. Philip Lokel of Loyoro, and Fr. Lotuk Samuel from Karenga. The first graduate was ordained in 1979, Fr. Thomas Logiel, the first Karamojong priest, followed others like Fr. Largo Koryang and Fr. Gabriel Koryang.

The Comboni missionaries, who had been expelled from southern Sudan, remained until 1999, when the operation and the administration of the school were handed over to the diocesan clergy, with the first diocesan rector being Fr. Clement Othim from Morulem.

St. Mary's Seminary Nadiket should not be confused with The International Seminary of The Apostles of Jesus, next door, also established by Bishop Mazzoldi. The graduates from this institution go on to be missionaries in other countries.

== See also ==
- Bukalasa National Minor Seminary
- Ggaba National Major Seminary
