= Karenga =

Karenga may refer to:

- Karenga (river), Transbaikalia, Russia

== Places ==
=== New Zealand ===
- Karenga Park, a city park in Rotorua
- Karenga Marae, a marae in Koutu, Rotorua

=== Uganda ===
- Karenga Community Wildlife Management Area, a locally managed conservation zone adjacent to Kidepo Valley National Park
- Karenga sub-county, a sub-county in Karenga District
- Karenga, a town in Karenga District

== People ==
- Maulana Karenga, an African-American activist and author
