= Kaabong General Hospital =

- Uganda Ministry of Health

Geography
- Location: Kaabong, Kaabong District, Karamoja sub-region, Uganda
- Coordinates: 03°30′39″N 34°07′53″E

Organisation
- Care system: Public
- Type: General

Services
- Emergency department: I
- Beds: 100

History
- Founded: 2011

Links
- Other links: Hospitals in Uganda

Kaabong General Hospital, also Kaabong District Hospital, is a public hospital in the Northeastern Region of Uganda.

== Location ==
The hospital is located in the town of Kaabong, in Kaabong District, in Karamoja sub-region, in Northern Uganda, about 187 kilometres (116 mi), by road, northwest of Moroto Regional Referral Hospital.

This is approximately 277 kilometres (172 mi), by road northeast of Gulu Regional Referral Hospital. The coordinates of Kaabong General Hospital are 03°30'39.0"N, 34°07'53.0"E (Latitude:03.510833; Longitude:34.131389).

== Overview ==
Kaabong General Hospital was established in 2011, by the elevation of Kaabong Health Centre IV to full hospital status. Kaabong General Hospital is on the list of general hospitals earmarked for renovation and expansion.

== See also ==
- List of hospitals in Uganda
