= Loyoro, Uganda =

- Etymology: Dodoth meaning 'place of harvesting white-ants'
- Location of Loyoro in Uganda
- Coordinates: 3.345623°N 34.280219°E
- Country: Uganda
- Region: Northern Region, Uganda
- Subregion: Karamoja
- District: Kaabong
- sub-county: Kapedo

Loyoro is a village in the Kaabong District of Uganda. It is in Kapedo Parish in Kapedo sub-county.

Loyoro lies in an area of low, rocky hills, with badly eroded soil. There are dense thickets of acacia thorn with sansevieria and other succulents, making grazing difficult for the flocks and herds of the Dodoth people who live in the region. The community has a government-sponsored primary school. A 2009 study found widespread malnutrition. 56.9% of people were stunted and 45.1% underweight. More than 88.6% of the people were over 5 kilometres (3.1 mi) from a health center. More than 90% used the bush rather than a latrine.

Security is a concern throughout the Karamoja Cluster side of Uganda. On 4 December 2009 a large group of Jie warriors crossed Loyoro sub county towards Mount Morungole and raided a protected kraal. They clashed with the army, losing 50 dead while nine soldiers of the Uganda People's Defense Force (UPDF) were killed. A March 2010 report said that as usual the movement of livestock away from the homesteads to dry season pastures have made them vulnerable to raids. Most of these raids had taken place in pastoral areas of Loyoro, northeast of Kaabong.
