= Kotido District =

- District
- District location in Uganda
- Coordinates: 03°31′N 34°07′E
- Country: Uganda
- Region: Northern Uganda
- Sub-region: Karamoja sub-region
- Capital: Kotido

Area
  - Total: 3,618 km^{2} (1,397 sq mi)

Population (2012 Estimate)
  - Total: 236,900
  - Density: 311.8/km^{2} (808/sq mi)
- Time zone: UTC+3 (EAT)
- Website: www.kotido.go.ug

Kotido District is a district in Northern Uganda. It is named after its 'chief town', Kotido, where the district headquarters are located.

== Location ==
Kotido District is bordered by Kaabong District to the north, Moroto District to the east, Napak District to the south and Abim District to the west. Agago District and Kitgum District lie to the northwest of Kotido District. The district headquarters at the town of Kotido is approximately 100 kilometres (62 mi) northwest of Moroto, the largest town in the sub-region. This location lies approximately 430 kilometres (270 mi), by road, northeast of Kampala, the capital of Uganda and the largest city in that country. The coordinates of the district are:03 31N, 34 07E.

== Overview ==
The district is part of the Karamoja sub-region, home to an estimated 1.2 million Karimojong, according to the 2002 national census. The sub-region consists of the following districts: (a) Abim District (b) Amudat District (c) Kaabong District (d) Kotido District (e) Moroto District (f) Nakapiripirit District (g) Napak District (h) Lusot District (i) Karenga District (j) Nabilatuk District

== Population ==
In 1991, the national population census estimated the district population at about 62,340. The national census in 2002 estimated the population of the district at about 129,100. The annual population growth rate in Kotido District, between 2002 and 2012, has been calculated at 6.39%. It is estimated that in 2012, the population of Kotido District was approximately 236,900.

== Geography and climate ==
Kotido District lies within the semi- arid Karamoja region characterized by :

- Low and unreliable rainfall
- Long dry seasons
- Frepuentdroughts
- Savannah grassland vegetation

== Sub-counties and parishes ==
Sub-county	2008 Population Estimates	Parishes
Kacheri	21,092	Kacheri, Lokiding, Losakucha
Kotido; Sub-county	36,828	Kanawat, Lokitelaebu, Losilang
Kotido Town Council	18,806	Kotido Central, Kotido East, Kotido North, Kotido West, Lokochil, Kotido Rural, Narikapet
Nakapelimoru	21,233	Lookorok, Potongor, Watakau
Panyangara	54,484	Kamau, Loletio, Lopotha, Rikitae
Rengen	26,863	Kotyang, Lokadeli, Nakwakwa, Lopoyo, Naponga
Total	179,306	

== Ethnicity and language ==
The district is predominantly inhabited by the Karimojong people, particularly the Jie ethnic group.

The main language spoken is Ngakarimojong, although English and Swahili are also used, especially in schools and administrative offices.

== Economic activities ==
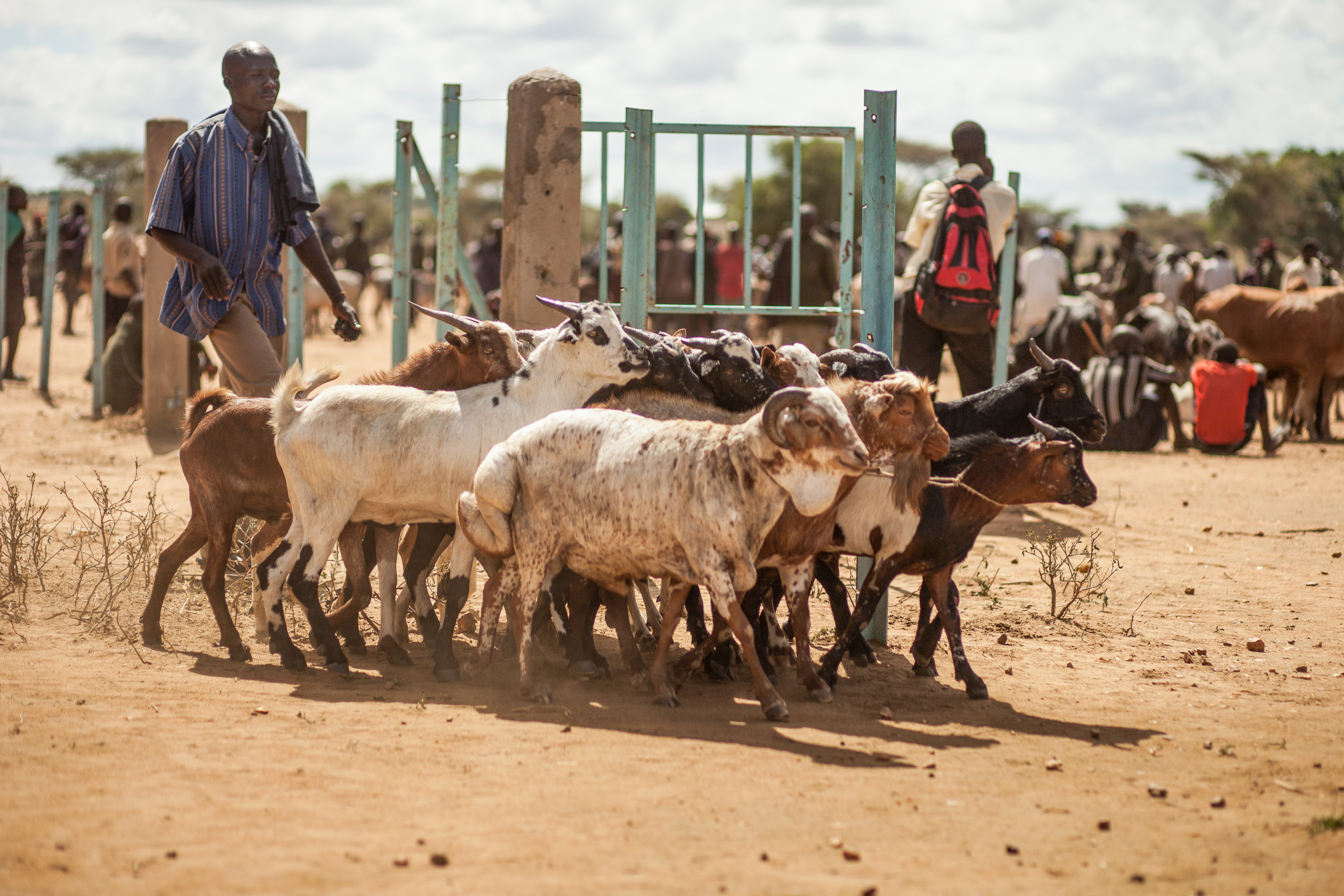
Shepherd in Kotido

Nomadic pastoralism is the main economic activity in the district.

In some areas, peasant agriculture is practiced. The crops grown include the following:

- Sorghum
- Maize
- Millet
- Peas
- Beans
- Sunflower
- Groundnuts
- Sweet potatoes

== Education ==
Kotido District has several government and community schools, although education access remains limited due to:

- Nomadic lifestyle
- Poverty
- Long distance to school
- Climate challenges

== Health service ==
Health services in Kotido District are provided through:

- Health CentreII
- Health Centre III
- Health Centre IV
- District hospitals

However, healthcare access remains limited due to poor infrastructure and long distances to health facilities

== Transport and infrastructure ==
The district is served mainly by murram roads, which connect it to:

- Moroto
- Abim
- Kaabong
- Kitgum

== See also ==
- Kotido
- Karamoja
- Karimojong
- Northern Uganda
- Districts of Uganda
