= Kaabong =

Ugandan town

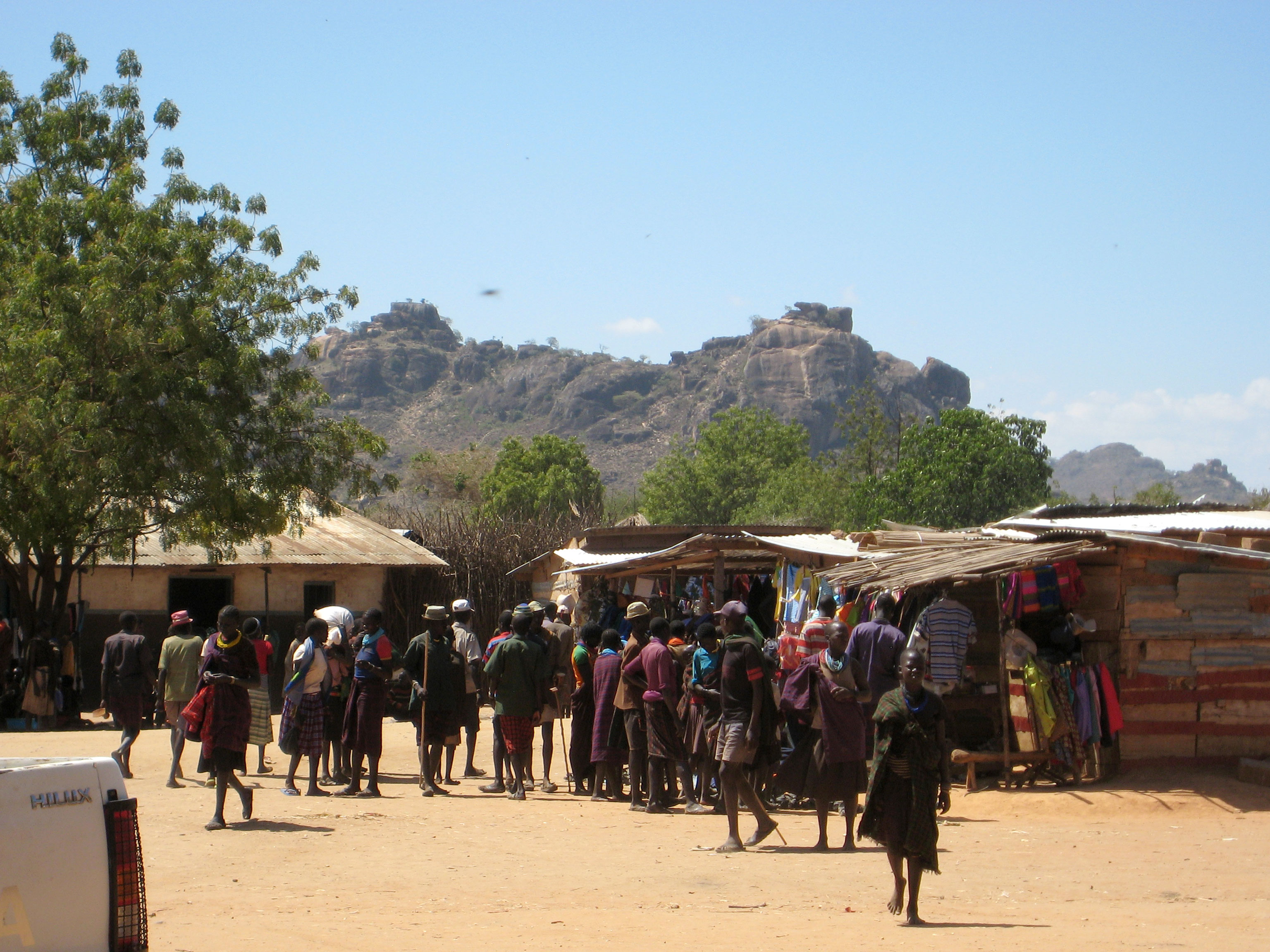
- Kaabong

- Map of Uganda showing the location of Kaabong.
- Coordinates: 03°31′12″N 34°07′12″E
- Country: Uganda
- Region: Northern Uganda
- Sub-region: Karamoja sub-region
- District: Kaabong District
- Elevation: 1,520 m (4,990 ft)

Population (2020 Estimate)
  - Total: 13,400
- Time zone: UTC+3 (EAT)

Kaabong is a town in the Northern Region of Uganda. It is the chief municipal, administrative and commercial center of the eponymous Kaabong District, and the district headquarters are located in the town.

== Location ==
Kaabong is located approximately 186 kilometres (116 mi), by road, northwest of Moroto, the largest city in the Karamoja sub-region. This is approximately 542 kilometres (337 mi), by road, northeast of Kampala, the capital and largest city of Uganda.

The geographical coordinates of the town are 3°31'12.0"N, 34°07'12.0"E (Latitude:3.5200; Longitude:34.1200).

== History ==
Kaabong has been a significant trading center since at least 1900. During the early colonial period the town was as Tshudi Tshudi and served as the hub for the trade of ivory from elephants poached around Karamoja in exchange for guns imported from Ethiopia.

== Population ==
The national census in 2002 estimated the population of Kaabong at 13,100. In 2010, the Uganda Bureau of Statistics (UBOS) estimated the population at 22,300. In 2011, UBOS estimated the mid-year population at 23,900.

In 2015, UBOS estimated the population of the town at 11,800. In 2020, the statistics agency estimates the mid-year population of Kaabong Town Council at 13,400 inhabitants. Of these, 6,900 (51.5 percent) were females and 6,500 (48.5 percent) were males. UBOS calculated that the population of Kaabong Town expanded at an average rate of 2.6 percent every year between 2015 and 2020.

Historical population
Year	Pop.	±%
2002	13,100	—
2010	22,300	+70.2%
2011	23,900	+7.2%
2015	11,800	−50.6%
2020	13,400	+13.6%

== Points of interest ==
The following points of interest lie within the town limits or close to the edges of town: (a) the offices of Kaabong Town Council (b) Kaabong Central Market (c) the headquarters of Kaabong District Administration.

Also located here is Kaabong Parish Catholic Church, a place of worship affiliated with the Roman Catholic Diocese of Kotido. Simon Lokodo was the parish priest here before he was elected to parliament to represent Dodoth County in this district, in 2006.

Kaabong General Hospital, a 100-bed hospital under the supervision of the Uganda Ministry of Health, is also located here, off the Kotido-Kaabong Road. Adjacent to the public hospital, is a branch of Stanbic Bank Uganda.

== See also ==
- Karamoja sub-region
- Karimojong
- List of cities and towns in Uganda
