= Moroto District =

District in Uganda

- District
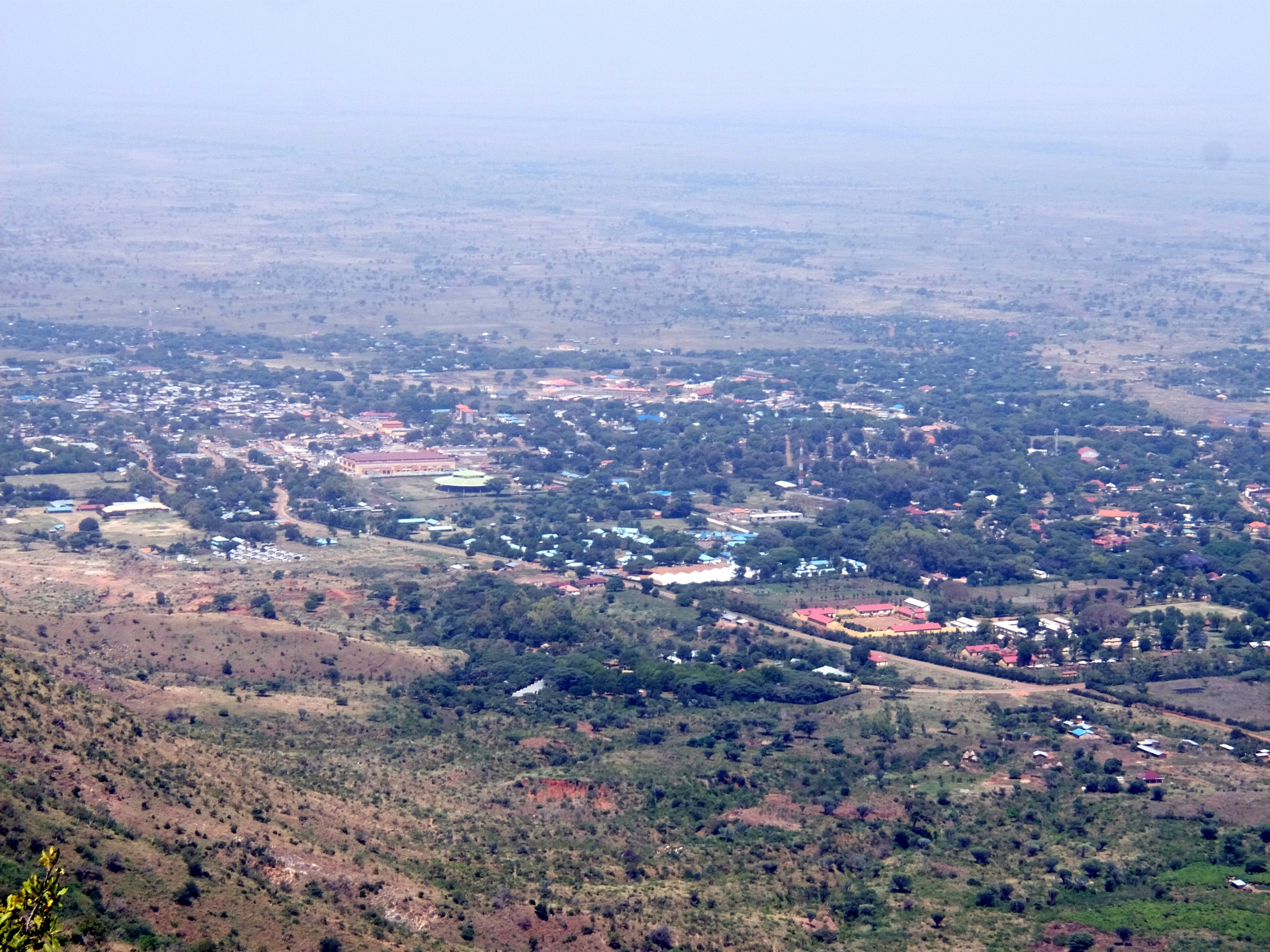

- District location in Uganda
- Coordinates: 02°32′N 34°40′E
- Country: Uganda
- Region: Northern Region of Uganda
- Sub-region: Karamoja sub-region
- Capital: Moroto

Area
  - Total: 3,537.6 km^{2} (1,365.9 sq mi)

Population (2014 census)
  - Total: 103,432
  - Density: 29/km^{2} (75/sq mi)
- Time zone: UTC+3 (EAT)
- Website: www.moroto.go.ug

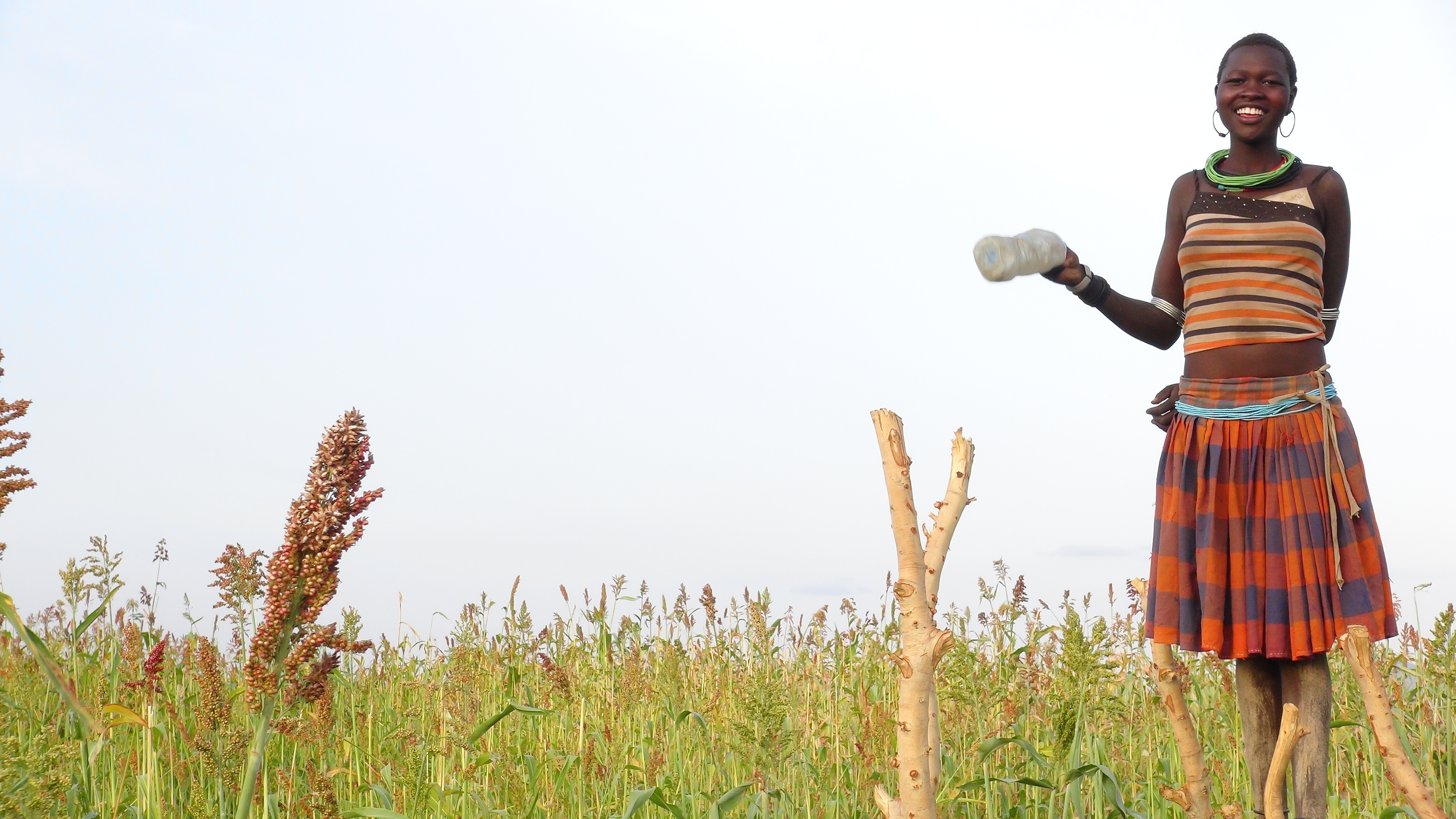
A lady scaring birds in Moroto-Karamoja uganda.

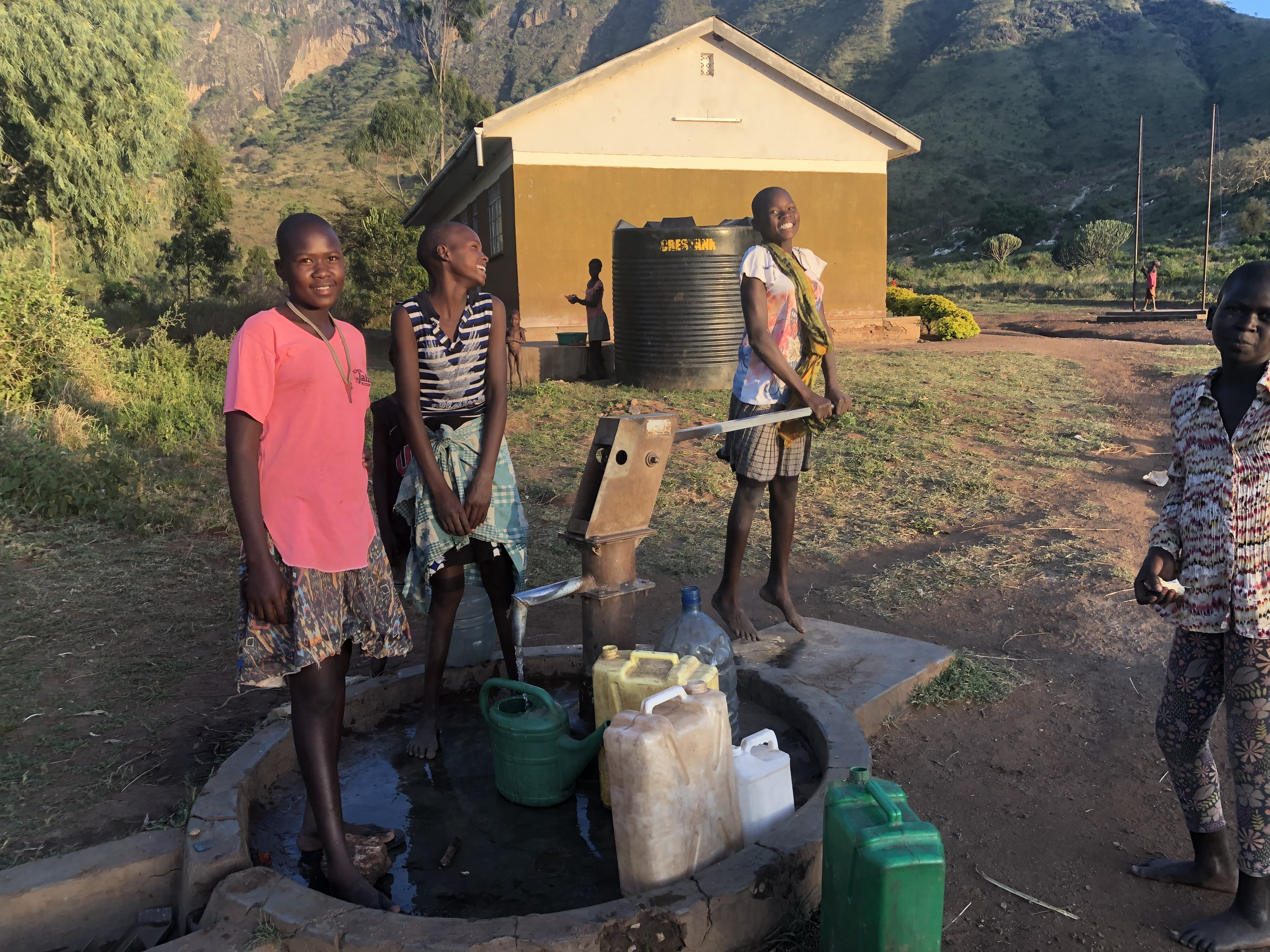
Girls collecting water from a borehole in Moroto, Uganda.

Moroto District is a district in the Northern Region of Uganda. The town of Moroto is the site of the district headquarters.

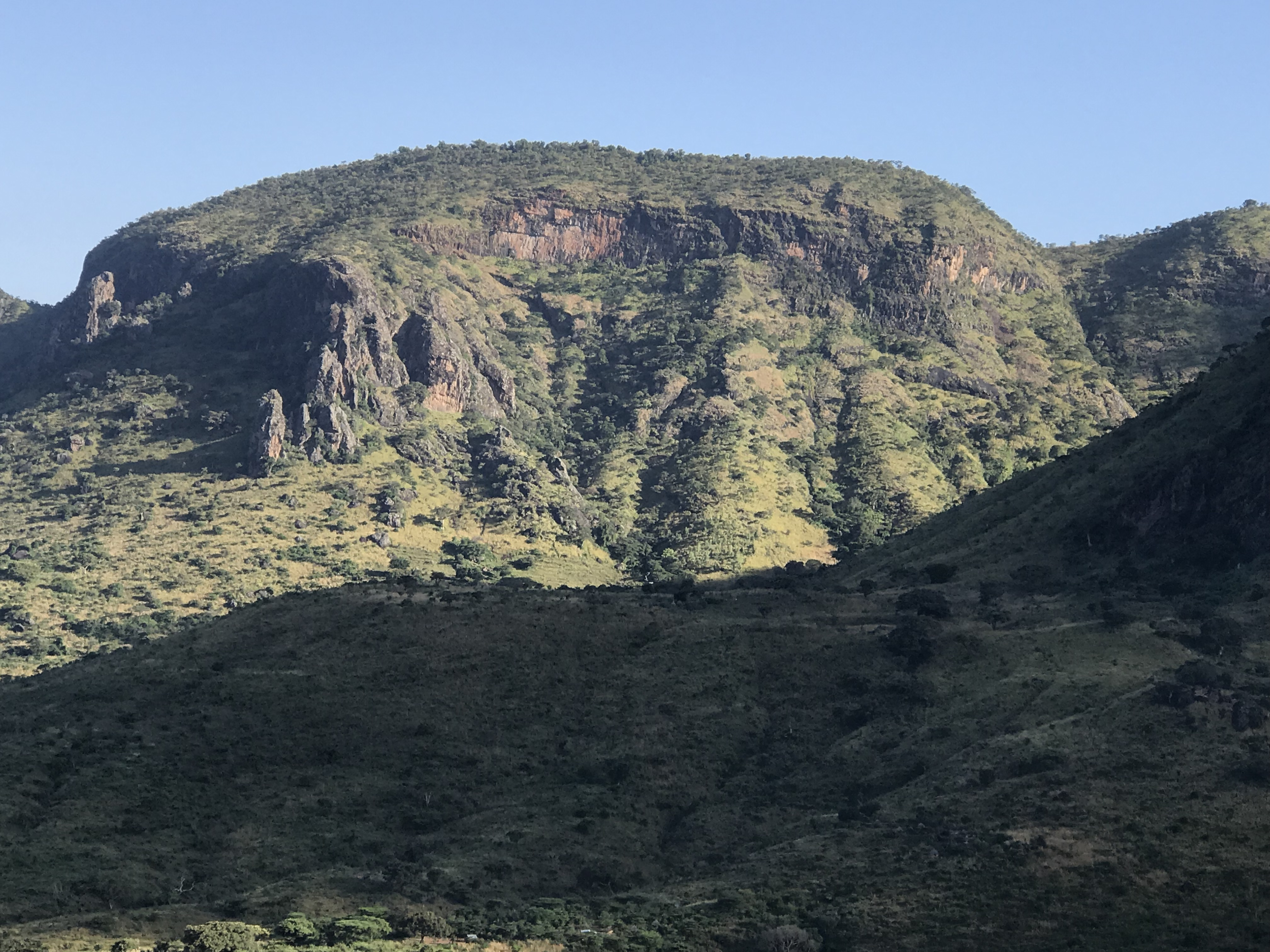
Mount Moroto

== Location ==
Moroto District is bordered by Kaabong District to the north, Kenya to the east, Amudat District to the south, Nakapiripirit District to the southwest, Napak District to the west, and Kotido District to the northwest. Moroto Town, where the district headquarters, is at the foot of Mt. Moroto. The town of Moroto is 213 kilometres (132 mi), by road, northeast of Mbale, the nearest large city. It lies about 434 kilometres (270 mi) northeast of Kampala, the capital and largest city of Uganda.

== Overview ==
Moroto District is part of the larger Karamoja sub-region. Moroto District is "characterized by rocky mountainous landscape with moderately low rainfall".

It is composed of three counties: Bokora County, Matheniko County, and Moroto Municipality. It is inhabited by the Karimojong, a distinctive ethnic group that highly cherishes its traditions.

The district is a hub of mineral resources that are yet to be optimally exploited. There are over fifty different minerals and precious stones in the Karamoja region. Of these, Moroto has gold, silver, copper, iron, titanium, manganese, niobium, tantalite, and chrome. Other proven minerals include marble, mica, garnets, limestone, and asbestos.

== Population ==
In 1991, the national census enumerated the district population at 59,149. The 2002 national census enumerated the population at 77,243. In August 2014, the national census and household survey enumerated the population at 103,432.

== See also ==
- Karamoja
- Moroto Town
- Mount Moroto
- Kotido District
- Nakapiripirit District
- Napak District
- Amudat District
- Karamojong
