= Loyoro sub-county =

- Etymology: from the administrative center, Loyoro
- Location of Loyoro sub-county in Uganda
- Coordinates: 3.322694444°N 34.17236111°E
- Country: Uganda
- Region: Northern
- District: Kaabong District

Population (2010)
  - Total: 26,269
- Time zone: UTC+3 (EAT)

Loyoro sub-county is a subdivision of Dodoth County, Kaabong District, Uganda.
