= Karamojong =

Karamojong may refer to:

- Karamojong people
- Karamojong language
