= Jie (Uganda) =

Ethnic group of Uganda

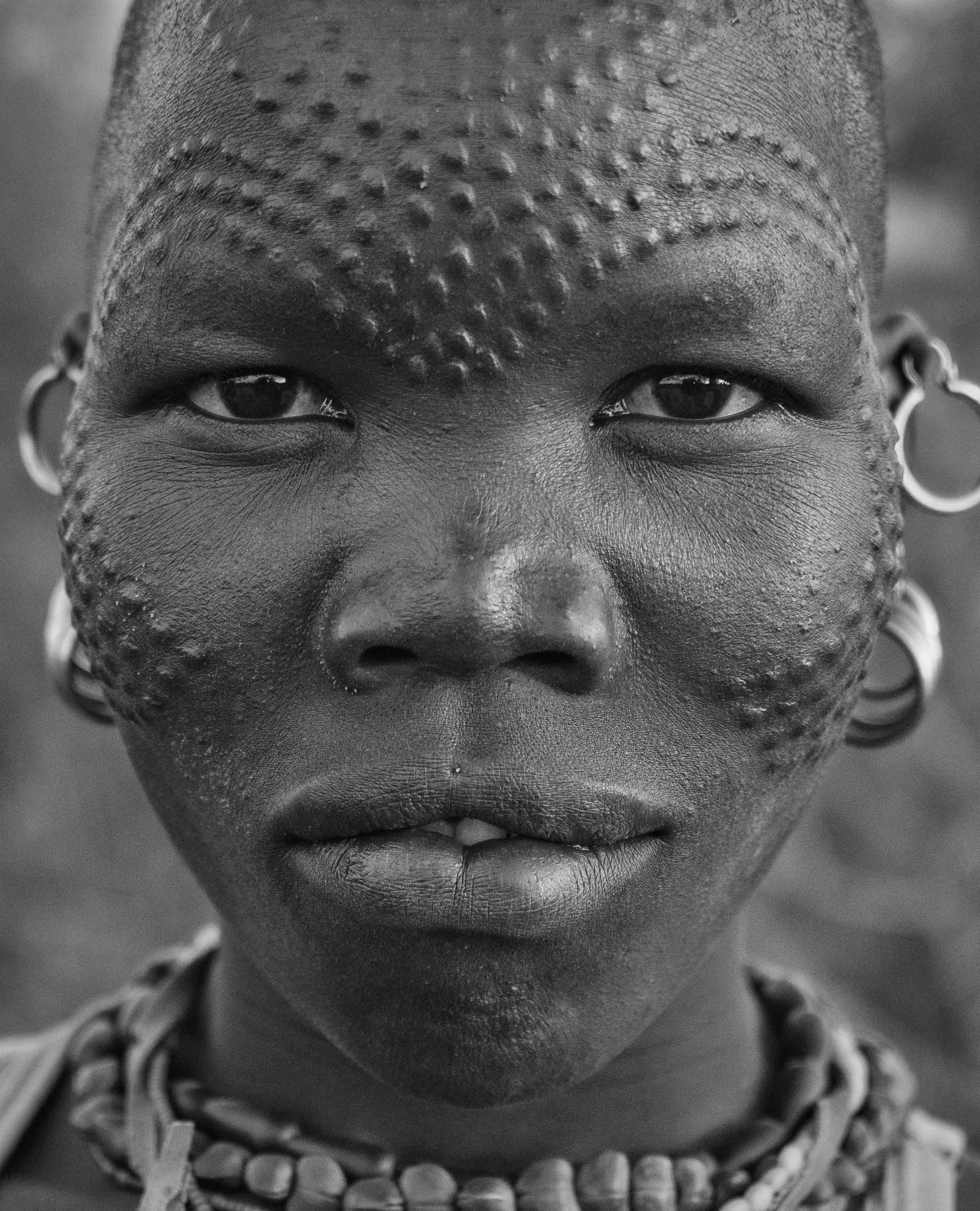
- A portrait of a Jie man

Total population
- 165,242 (2014)

Regions with significant populations
- Uganda
- Uganda: 165,242

Languages
- Karamojong language

Related ethnic groups
- Karamojong people, Dodoth people, Toposa people, Turkana people
- The Jie are semi-nomadic pastoralists known for their traditional warrior culture.

The Jie are an ethnic group in Uganda. They belong to the Karamojong Cluster, which also includes the Karamojong and Dodoth people. Their country in northeast Uganda lies between the Dodoth to the north and the Karamojong to the south.

The Jie people were estimated to number about 50,000 as of 1986. Their language is a dialect of the Karamojong language. In the 2014 Census of Uganda the Jie ethnic group numbered 165,242 people. Jie families that believe they are distantly related in the male line often keep their homesteads close to each other. Jie clans are groups of related people that may have over one hundred members. They are exogamous, meaning that people must marry outside the clan, and men should generally not marry into their mother's clan. There are some common cultural symbols among the Jie, such as jewelry, but they do not have strong shared taboos related to animals or food.

The Jie are semi-nomadic pastoral people. They share the habit of constant low-level warfare, mainly to capture cattle, with their neighbors. According to P.H. Gulliver, writing in 1952, "Turkana made war on all their neighbours with the exception of the Jie, with whom they occasionally allied themselves against the Karamajong and the Dodoth. Karamajong similarly made war on all their neighbors with the exception of the Dudoth, with whom they occasionally allied themselves against the Jie. Jie claim friendship with the Toposa, but since they have no common boundaries this would have been of little importance. Toposa and Donyiro did not fight each other, and are known to have formed an alliance against the Turkana. Toposa and Jie were enemies".

The Jie have experienced difficulty with a government that is not sympathetic to their lifestyle, wanting them to stay in one place for easier administration, and to sell their cattle for cash to pay taxes. The people retain their warlike traditions. In June 2009, eight people were shot dead by Jie warriors in the Kaabong district. The warriors had been prevented by police from raiding protected kraals. They killed six residents of Luwakuj village in the Kapedo sub-county and two residents of Lukwakaramoi village in the Kalapata sub-county.

== See also ==
- Acholi
- Lango
- Gisu
- Baganda
