= Sidok sub-county =

Sub-county in Kaabong District, Uganda

- Sub-county
- Sidok Sub-county
- Etymology: from the administrative center, Sidok
- Location in UgandaUganda
- Coordinates: 3.36667°N 34.01667°E
- Country: Uganda
- Region: Northern Region
- Sub-region: Karamoja sub-region
- District: Kaabong District
- County: Dodoth East County
- Administrative centre: Sidok

Population (2024)
  - Total: 14,140
- Time zone: UTC+3 (EAT)

Sidok Sub-county is a local government area in Dodoth East County, Kaabong District, in the Northern Region of Uganda, within the Karamoja sub-region.

== Location and administration ==
Sidok is one of the sub-counties listed under Dodoth East County in Kaabong District. A commonly used coordinate reference for Sidok is recorded in gazetteer-style geographic listings for the area.

== Administrative history ==
In August 2017, Uganda Radio Network reported on new sub-counties created in Karamoja, including Kakamar Sub-county created from Sidok Sub-county, with operationalisation stated as effective July 2018.

== Population ==
The National Population and Housing Census (NPHC) 2014 provisional results list Sidok with 12,799 people (6,027 males and 6,772 females) and 2,470 households. The NPHC 2024 results, as published in an UBOS-referenced compilation, list Sidok (Kopoth) with 14,140 people (6,812 males and 7,328 females).

Population counts reported for Sidok Sub-county
Census year	Total population	Males	Females	Source
2014	12,799	6,027	6,772	UBOS (Provisional Results)
2024	14,140	6,812	7,328	UBOS-referenced population compilation

== Livelihoods and land use ==
A 2017 Food Security and Nutrition Assessment for Kaabong District reported high access to agricultural land in Sidok (94% of households). It also reported an average land size figure for Sidok of 3.39 acres in the same district comparison set.

== Water and sanitation ==
The Ministry of Water and Environment Water Supply Database (WSDB) district reporting page for Kaabong lists sub-county level entries including Sidok, and shows an access figure for Sidok alongside functional water source counts on the same listing.

== Health ==
Health facility gazetteer listings for Kaabong District place Kopoth Health Centre II in Sidok, with recorded coordinates for the facility location.

== Electoral statistics ==
The Electoral Commission of Uganda sub-county statistics listing includes an entry for “Sidok (Kopoth)”.

== See also ==
- Kaabong District
- Karamoja
