= Kapedo sub-county =

Kapedo
- Sub-county
- Etymology: from the administrative center, Kapedo
- Location within Uganda
- Coordinates: 3°41′20″N 33°56′42″E
- Country: Uganda
- Region: Karamoja
- District: Karenga District

Population (2010)
  - Total: 39,665

Kapedo sub-county is a subdivision of Dodoth West County in the Karenga District of the Northern Region of Uganda. It contains one parish, Komolicher. Prior to the 2019 creation of the Karenga District, Kapedo was part of the Kaabong District.
