= Kathile sub-county =

- Etymology: from the administrative center, Kathile
- Location of Kathile sub-county in Uganda
- Coordinates: 3°38′44.8″N 34°4′42.91″E
- Country: Uganda
- Region: Northern
- District: Kaabong District

Population (2010)
  - Total: 37,467
- Time zone: UTC+3 (EAT)

Kathile sub-county is a subdivision of Dodoth County, Kaabong District, Uganda.
