= Lolelia sub-county =

- Etymology: from the administrative center, Lolelia
- Location of Lolelia sub-county in Uganda
- Coordinates: 3°31′48.24″N 34°2′46.59″E
- Country: Uganda
- Region: Northern
- District: Kaabong District

Population (2010)
  - Total: 39,665
- Time zone: UTC+3 (EAT)

Lolelia sub-county is a subdivision of Dodoth County in Kaabong District of northern Uganda.
