= Lygodactylus karamoja =

Karamoja dwarf gecko

Conservation status
- CITES Appendix I

Scientific classification
- Kingdom: Animalia
- Phylum: Chordata
- Class: Reptilia
- Order: Squamata
- Suborder: Gekkota
- Family: Gekkonidae
- Genus: Lygodactylus
- Species: L. karamoja

Binomial name
- Lygodactylus karamoja Lobón-Rovira, Bauer, Pinto, Trape, Conradie, Kusamba, Júlio, Cael, Stanley, Hughes, Begangana, Masudi, Pauwels & Greenbaum, 2023

Species of lizard

Lygodactylus karamoja is a species of dwarf gecko discovered in Uganda in 2023. It is named after the Karamajong people. L. karamoja inhabits "lowland savannahs" in East Africa.

== Discovery ==
After researching in 2015, a team of scientists in Uganda, exploring the rainforest in 2023 found a pregnant dwarf gecko and 7 lizards perched on a tree. They picked it up as a new species.

== Distribution ==
Lygodactylus karamoja is only known from eastern Uganda. It is possible that its true range extends into Kenya and South Sudan.

== Description ==
=== Size ===
The Karamoja dwarf gecko is relatively large for dwarf geckos, at 3 in (7.6 cm) in length.

=== Appearance ===
Karamojas are brown or coral all throughout with yellowish white underside. Its scales have a mix of white, black, and brown shades. 2 black V-shaped marking bands can be found under their heads, pointing forwards.
