= Dodoth people =

Ethnic group in north eastern Uganda

Dodoth
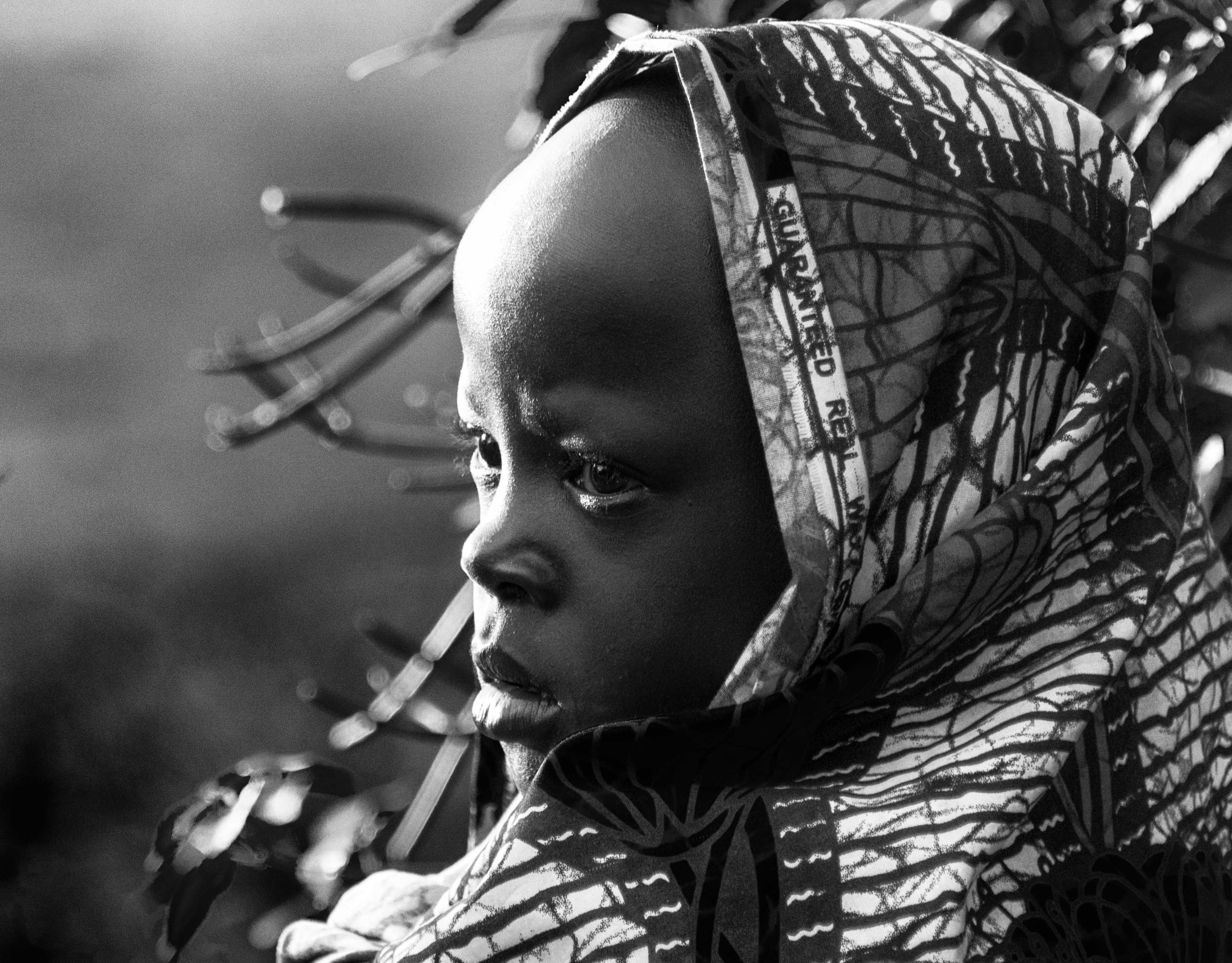
- Dodoth Girl in Kaabong

Total population
- 129,102 (2014, census)

Regions with significant populations
- Uganda
- Uganda: 129,102

Languages
- Karamojong language

Related ethnic groups
- Karamojong people, Jie
- The Dodoth are known for their pastoral lifestyle and their involvement in the cattle raiding culture of the region.

The Dodoth (or Dodos) are an ethnic group in north eastern Uganda. They belong to the Karamojong Cluster, which also includes the Karamojong and Jie people. Their language is a dialect of the Karamojong language. Their population is estimated at 129,102 (2014 Census of Uganda).

== Location ==
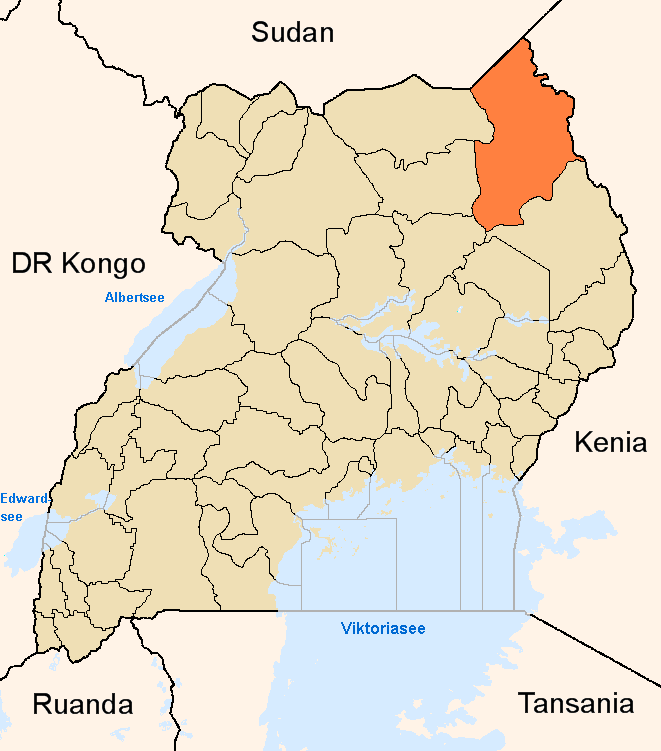
The former Kotido District in Uganda. Kaabong is in the north.

The Dodoth live in Kaabong District in the northeast of Uganda, a region of semi-arid savannah, bush and mountains. Their tradition says that they arrived in their current area from the north. In the mid-eighteenth century they separated from the Karamojong and moved northward into more mountainous territory. The heartland of their country is a bowl surrounded by mountains and hills on all sides. The tallest peak, Mount Morungole, is over 9,000 feet (2,700 m) high, near the point where Kenya, Sudan and Uganda converge. The land was once rich in wildlife, including lions, elephants, buffalo, giraffes and rhino. Today, a small remnant of this wildlife is preserved in Kidepo National Park.

The climate is harsh. Some rain may fall in April, and there is usually a longer rainy season from June to early September, but these rains are not dependable and in some years fail altogether. In good years, the Dodoth mainly live on sorghum and millet. To survive in tough years, they depend on livestock - cattle, goats and sheep. As well as providing nutrition, the animals represent wealth and are central to many aspects of their culture.

== Homesteads ==
The Dodoth homesteads are usually in valleys and have dry season pastures on nearby hillsides. Unlike other people of the region, they therefore do not have to migrate with the seasons. Dodoth homesteads are isolated from one another, surrounded by a strong wall made of upright poles with interwoven branches cemented with mud and cow dung. Cattle are kept within the walls at night. A homestead may include up to forty people. Each wife has her own hut and fireplace. Her adolescent daughters will often build their own huts next to their mother's hut. Adolescent boys live in a larger "men's house" until they marry. A woman will often have a small garden near her hut.

== Conflict ==
The scarcity of resources and high value of cattle have led to a culture where men are noted for their bravery in raiding and warfare and their resultant wealth. Bride prices are paid in cattle. The Dodoth share the habit of constant low-level warfare, mainly to capture cattle, with their neighbors. According to P.H. Gulliver, writing in 1952, "Turkana made war on all their neighbours with the exception of the Jie, with whom they occasionally allied themselves against the Karamajong and the Dodoth. Karamajong similarly made war on all their neighbors with the exception of the Dodoth, with whom they occasionally allied themselves against the Jie. Jie claim friendship with the Toposa, but since they have no common boundaries this would have been of little importance. Toposa and Donyiro did not fight each other, and are known to have formed an alliance against the Turkana. Toposa and Jiye were enemies".

Plans for cattle raids and other important decisions are decided by the menfolk, with the views of the elders carrying great weight. The Dodoth are less well armed than their neighbors, and in 1979–81 lost practically all of their cattle to better-armed raiders. In 2004, there were violent clashes between the Dodoth and the Turkana people of Kenya, to the east. Several Turkana were kidnapped and had begun to be integrated into Dodoth families by the time a peace conference was held in 2005. At this conference, it was agreed to forget the past and return the captured people.
