= Karenga, Uganda =

Town in Uganda

Karenga
- Map of Uganda showing the location of Karenga.
- Coordinates: 3.56760°N 33.69512°E
- Country: Uganda
- Region: Northern Uganda
- Sub-region: Karamoja
- District: Karenga District
- Time zone: UTC+3 (EAT)

Karenga is a town in the Karenga District, in the Karamoja sub-region, in northeast Uganda. It is the administrative and commercial headquarters of Karenga District, which became effective in 2019.

== Location ==
Karenga Town is located approximately 141 kilometres (88 mi) northwest of Kotido, the nearest urban center. This is approximately 247 kilometres (153 mi) northwest of Moroto Town, the largest town in the Karamoja sub-region.

The town is one of the primary gateways into Kidepo Valley National Park. Karenga town is composed of various tribes both from Acholi and Karamoja with vast languages and even the south Sudanese 'Mening quarters'. The soil supports growth of various food crops for subsistence homestead use.

== See also ==
- List of cities and towns in Uganda
