= Kalapata sub-county =

- Etymology: from the administrative center, Kalapata.
- Location of Kalapata sub-county in Uganda
- Coordinates: 3°39′37.27″N 34°11′27.15″E
- Country: Uganda
- Region: Northern
- District: Kaabong District

Population (2010)
  - Total: 54,840
- Time zone: UTC+3 (EAT)

Kalapata sub-county is a subdivision of Dodoth County, Kaabong District, Uganda.
