= Karenga sub-county =

- Etymology: from the administrative center, Karenga
- Location within Uganda
- Coordinates: 3°34′N 33°41′E
- Country: Uganda
- Region: Karamoja
- District: Kaabong District

Government
  - Mayor: Peter Abach
- Elevation: 1,414 m (4,639 ft)

Population (2010)
  - Total: 35,583

Karenga sub-county is a subdivision of Dodoth County in Kaabong District of northern Uganda. Kidepo Valley National Park forms the northern half of the sub-county. As of 2024, its population was 5,167.
