= Simon Lokodo =

Ugandan politician (1957–2022)

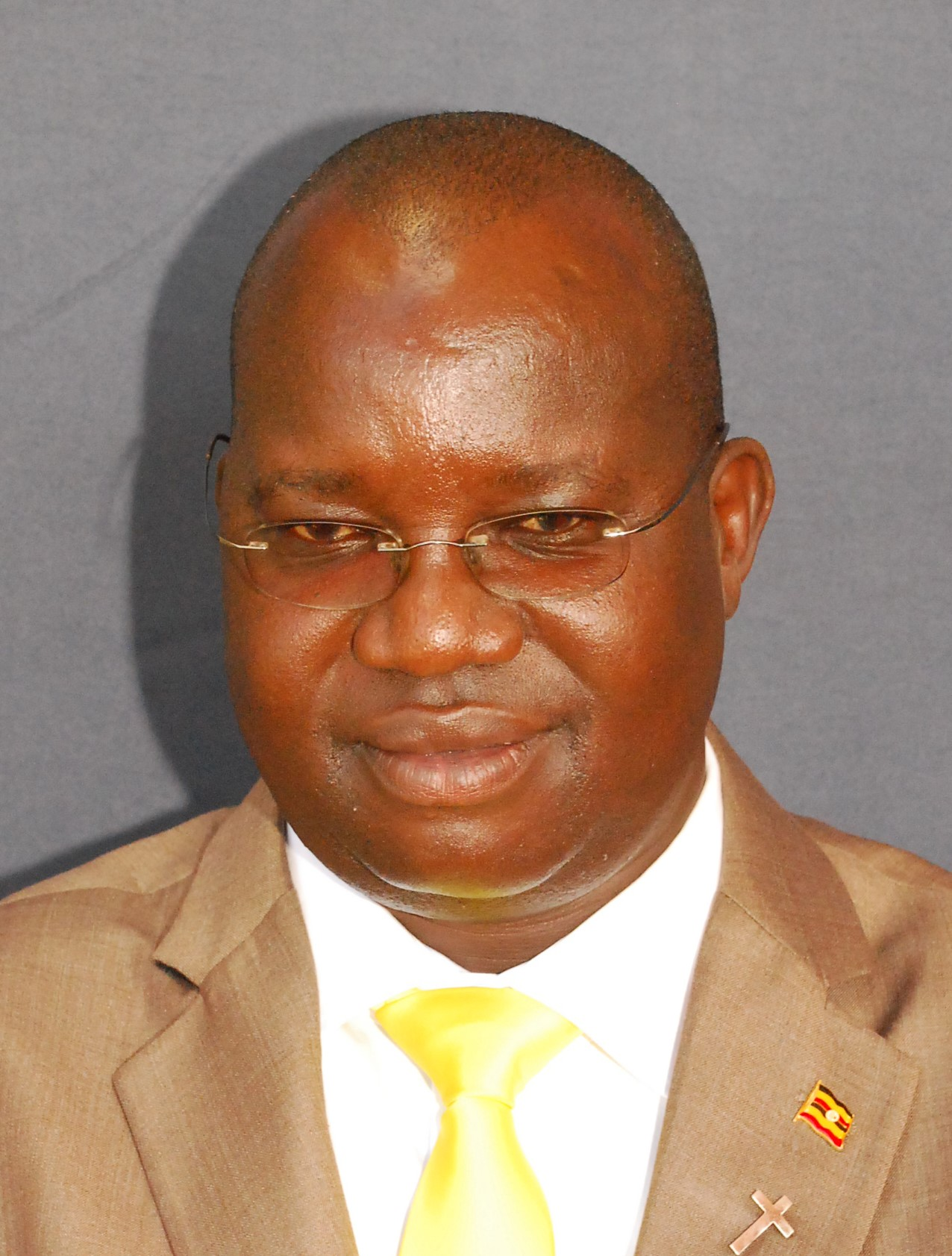
- Lokodo in 2011
- Born: 28 October 1957; Kaabong District, Uganda
- Died: 29 January 2022 (aged 64); Geneva, Switzerland
- Citizenship: Uganda
- Education: Pontifical Urbaniana University (Bachelor of Arts in Theology) (Master's of Arts in Biblical Theology)
- Occupations: Catholic priest and politician
- Years active: 2006–2022
- Known for: Politics
- Title: Minister of State for Ethics & Integrity

Simon Lokodo (28 October 1957 – 29 January 2022) was a Ugandan politician who served as Minister of State for Ethics and Integrity in the Office of the President of Uganda since 2011. Previously, he was the Minister of State for Industry from 2009 to 2011. He also served as the elected Member of Parliament representing Dodoth County, Kaabong District since 2006 until he lost his Parliamentary seat in January 2021 after so many of his previous accusing him of supporting the act removal of age limit from the presidential aspirants. He also served as a member of the Uganda Human Rights Commission.

== Background and education ==
Lokodo was born in Kaabong District on 28 October 1957. Simon Lokodo held the degree of Bachelor of Arts in Theology from the Pontifical Urbaniana University. His Master of Arts in Theology was also obtained from the same university of Rome. He also held the Diploma in Rural Sociology, the Diploma in Social Communication, the Diploma in Philosophy & Social Science and the Certificate in Italian Language. He obtained his Diploma in Theology, from Makerere University, Uganda's oldest university; founded in 1922. Lokodo also held a Certificate in German Language obtained from an institution in Austria and a Certificate in French Language, obtained from an institution in Paris, France.

== Political career ==
At the age of 49, Lokodo first entered politics to contest a special election on 29 June 2006, following the death of the incumbent member of parliament. He was suspended from his priestly duties by Pope Benedict XVI when he entered politics. He won the special election and began representing Dodoth County, Kaabong District, in the parliament. In February 2009, he was appointed to the cabinet as the Minister of State for Industry & Technology. In the cabinet reshuffle of 27 May 2011, he was relocated to the Ethics & Integrity portfolio, replacing Nsaba Buturo. In the cabinet reshuffle of 1 March 2015, he retained his cabinet post.

He was well known for challenging homosexuality in all forms. In 2012, he and the police raided and shut down a gay activist workshop. He was quoted as saying, "I have closed this conference because it's illegal. We do not accept homosexuality in Uganda." He also blamed foreigners, saying they should "go back home". Amnesty International condemned the raid.

In 2014, Stephen Fry interviewed Lokodo in Stephen Fry: Out There, where he was quoted as saying "...men raping girls. Which is natural." Fry later revealed in 2016 that he had attempted suicide in the hours after the interview.

In February 2014, dress code legislation was enacted, aimed primarily at women. Clothes that are considered revealing or sexually provocative were to be outlawed; "If you dress in such a way that you irritate the mind and excite the people then you are badly dressed; if you draw the attention of the other person outside there with a malicious purpose of exciting and stimulating him or her into sex," Lokodo stated.

He served as the elected Member of Parliament representing Dodoth County, Kaabong District until he lost his Parliamentary seat in January 2021. At the time of his death on 29 January 2022, he was serving as a member of the Uganda Human Rights Commission.

== Personal life and death ==
Lokodo was reported to speak and write fluent English, Italian, French, German, and Spanish.

He died in Geneva on 29 January 2022, at the age of 64 from COVID-19.

== See also ==
- Parliament of Uganda
- Cabinet of Uganda
- Government of Uganda
- Rape culture
