= Kaabong District =

- District
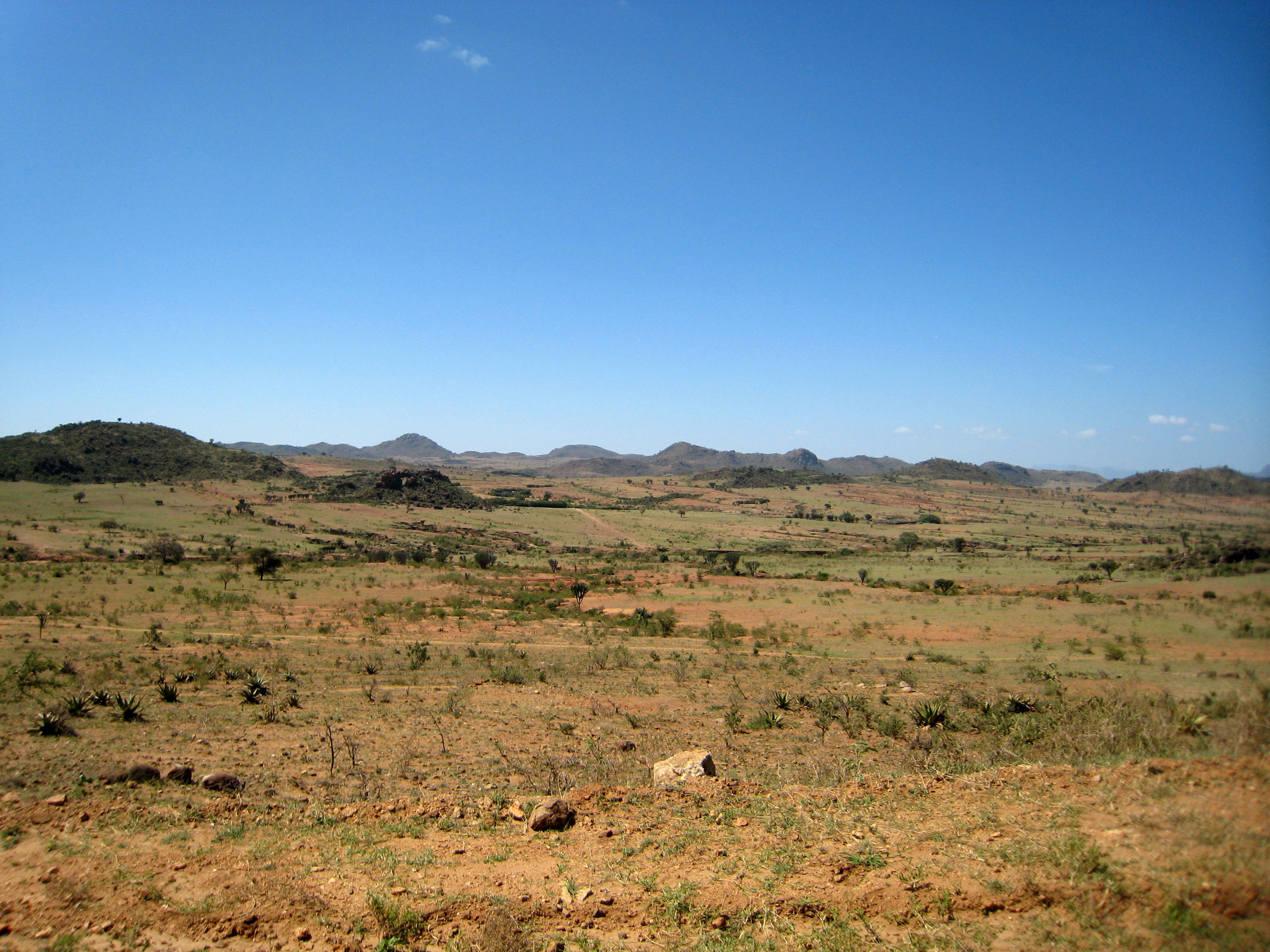

- District location in Uganda
- Coordinates (Kaabong): 03°32′24″N 34°07′30″E
- Country: Uganda
- Region: Northern Region of Uganda
- Sub-region: Karamoja sub-region
- Split from Kotido District: 2005
- Capital: Kaabong

Area
  - Land: 7,223.7 km^{2} (2,789.1 sq mi)
- Highest elevation (Mount Morungole): 2,749 m (9,019 ft)

Population (2024 Census)
  - Total: 216,011
  - Density: 54.7/km^{2} (142/sq mi)
- Time zone: UTC+3 (EAT)

Kaabong District is a district in the Northern Region of Uganda. The district headquarters are in the similarly named town of Kaabong.

== Location ==
Kaabong District is bordered by South Sudan to the northwest, Kenya to the northeast and the east, Moroto District to the southeast, Kotido District to the south, and Karenga District to the west. The district headquarters at Kaabong, are approximately 177 kilometres (110 mi), by road, northwest of Moroto City, the largest urban centre in the Karamoja sub-region. In July 2019, the newly formed Karenga District was split off from Kaabong District.

== Overview ==
Kaabong District became functional on 1 July 2005. Prior to that, it was known as Dodoth County in Kotido District. The district is part of the Karamoja sub-region, home to an estimated 1.2 million Karimojong.

Kaabong has two counties: Dodoth East County and Dodoth West County. This is divided into one town council, Kaabong, and thirteen sub-counties: Lobalangit, Kawalako, Kapedo, Lolelia, Lodiko, Kathile, Sidok, Kalapata, Kamion, Kaabong East, Kaabong West and Loyoro.

== Geography ==
Kaabong District has a rocky landscape with hills and valleys. The vegetation is primarily bushes and shrubs. The climatic/weather conditions of Kaabong District are more diverse with various soil types, vegetation and altitudes. There are some areas that contain savannah vegetation, but most of the district is semi-arid with thorny shrubs. There is only one annual season of cultivation. Kidepo Valley National Park is located in the district, approximately 66 kilometres (41 mi), by road, northwest of the district headquarters at Kaabong Town.

== Population ==
In 1991, the national population census estimated the population of the district at around 91,200. The 2002 census estimated the population of the district at approximately 202,800. The annual population growth rate in the district, between 2002 and 2012, was 7 percent. In 2012, it is the population of Kaabong District was estimated at 395,200. Preliminary census results of the 9 May 2024 national census put Kaabong District's population as constituted then (with Karenga District removed), at 216,011 of whom 111,804 (51.8 percent) were female and 104,207 (48.2) were male.

== Notable people ==
- Simon Lokodo, politician and catholic priest

== See also ==
- Karamoja sub-region
- Karimojong
- Kidepo Valley National Park
- Districts of Uganda

== Economy ==
- Livestock faming
- Maize
- trade and commerce (local market)
- Tourism
- Beans
- Sorghum

== Livestock ==
- Cattle
- Goats
- Chicken
- Donkey

== See also ==
- Northern Region, Uganda
- Districts of Uganda
- Counties of Uganda
- Parliament of Uganda
