= Karamojong language =

Eastern Nilotic language spoken in Uganda

Karamojong
- Ngakarimojong/N'Karamojong
- ŋaKarimojoŋ/ŋaKaramojoŋ
- Native to: Uganda
- Region: Karamoja
- Ethnicity: Karamojong people
- Native speakers: 691,000 (2014 census)
- Language family: Nilo-Saharan?: Eastern Sudanic?; Southern Eastern; Nilotic; Eastern; Ateker–Lotuko–Maa; Ateker; Turkanic; Karamojong
- Dialects: Jie; Dodos
- Writing system: Latin script

Language codes
- ISO 639-3: kdj
- Glottolog: kara1483

The Karamojong language (spelled ŋaKarimojoŋ or ŋaKaramojoŋ in Karamojong; Ngakarimojong or N'Karamojong in English) is a Nilotic language spoken by the Karamojong people in Northeast Uganda.

Ngakarimojong is a Nilotic language of the Nilo-Saharan language family spoken by at least 370,000 people in Uganda – the Karamojong people, or ŋiKarimojoŋ in their language. The name approximates to "the old men sat down", dating from a time of migration 300 or more years ago when this group refused to travel further on (to what is now Teso). They are a cattle-keeping people practising transhumance, which is reflected in the language as are their traditional religious beliefs. Settled cultivation is relatively recent and thus words associated with this are usually borrowed from neighbouring languages or from languages introduced by, or as a result of, colonialism – English, Luganda, Swahili. Modern technical words come from these latter also.

Closely related languages and dialects are spoken by many more peoples, including the Jie, Dodoth, Teso (in Uganda), Turkana, Tesyo (in Kenya), Jiye, Toposa in South Sudan (?), and also by at least one tribe in Ethiopia, the Nyangatom. Jie and Dodoth (Dodos) are counted as dialects by Ethnologue 16, but as separate languages by Blench (2012).

These peoples are part of the Karamojong cluster of Nilotic tribes, which is also called the Teso cluster.

== Phonology ==
=== Consonants ===
Consonants
		Labial	Dental	Alveolar	Palato- alveolar	Palatal	Velar	Glottal
Plosive/Affricate	voiceless	p		t	tʃ		k	ʔ
Plosive/Affricate	voiced	b		d			g	
Fricative	voiceless			s				
Fricative	voiced		ð	z			ɣ	
Nasal		m		n		ɲ	ŋ	
Trill				r				
Approximant		w		l		j		

=== Vowels ===
Vowels
	Front		Central	Back
Close	i	y		u
Near-close	ɪ			ʊ
Close-mid	e		ɵ	o
Open-mid	ɛ			ɔ
Near-open	æ			
Open	a			ɑ

- Each vowel has a voiceless counterpart.
- The language also has vowel harmony based on advanced and retracted tongue root. The [-ATR] set is /ɪ ʊ ɛ ɔ ɑ/, and the [+ATR] set is /i u e o ɑ̟/. [ɑ] was formerly thought to not participate in the vowel harmony system. However, Lesley-Neuman (2007) assumes that /ɑ/ becomes [ɑ̟] in [+ATR] environments.

=== Tones ===
Karamojong has three basic tones: high, mid, and low. There are also three contour tones: high-low, mid-low, and low-mid.

== Grammar ==
In Ngakarimojong grammar, verbs come first. Verb forms differ in aspect rather than tense; first person plural personal and possessive pronouns have both inclusive and exclusive forms (noted from Burningham 1994?).

Word order can change to clarify words that can be nouns or verbs. For example, 'akimat' means 'old woman', or, 'to drink'. If you say 'acamit ayoŋ akimat' you are saying you want the old woman rather than you want to drink, so in this case the infinitive is rather oddly replaced by the vocative, thus 'acamit ayoŋ tomat' to avoid confusion when you need a drink.

Nouns and pronouns have gender prefixes, which can change meaning, e.g. ekitoi (masculine) means tree or medicine obtained from a tree or bush, akitoi (feminine) means log or firewood, and ikitoi (neuter) means twigs used to light cooking fires. The neuter often implies a diminutive – edia (masculine) means boy and idia (neuter) means little boy.

Almost all plural nouns are prefixed with 'ŋa' (feminine) or 'ŋi' (masculine and neuter). There are generally suffixes on plural nouns which, to the learner at least, have little regularity, for example 'emong / ŋimongin' – 'ox / oxen' and 'akai / ŋakais' - 'house/s', or even removal of last letter, thus 'emoru / ŋimor' – 'mountain/s' and 'aberu / ŋaber(u)' – 'woman / women'.

Most traditionally known liquids such as water (ŋakipi) and milk (ŋakile) are feminine plural (though the eng prefix has been lost in some dialects), whereas more recently introduced liquids, such as bottled beer ('ebiya') are masculine singular. Male names mostly begin with "Lo" whilst female names begin with "Na", thus Lokiru and Nakiru are a boy and a girl born at the time of rain. In other Nilotic languages in the region, this rule applies without the "L" and "N".

Ngakarimojong has no articles.

== Spelling and pronunciation ==
Written Ngakarimojong uses the Roman alphabet, and spelling rules were established by missionaries in the 1960s. Due to the recent creation of the orthography (spelling system) for Ngakarimojong, spelling usually accurately reflects pronunciation, except as otherwise noted. There are no letters or corresponding sounds "F", "H" "Q", "X" or "Z" in Ngakarimojong words. The Ngakarimojong alphabet includes the letters eng ("Ŋ") and nya ("Ny"). Sometimes "P" sounds more like "F" in English, so when learning English, Ngakarimojong speakers sometimes confuse these sounds. On the other hand, Karimojong speakers are generally not prone to confusing "L" and "R", unlike native speakers of many other East African languages. There is a tendency to mouth a silent "O" or "U" on the end of some words ending with consonants. Adjacent vowels are usually pronounced without diphthongs.

The orthography was created mainly by British Anglicans and Italian Roman Catholics. As a result, there were variations in the spelling rules. The most obvious example is how to spell the sound which is halfway between an "S" as in "sink" and" th" as in "think". This was tendered by the Anglicans as "th" and the Catholics as "z". These days both "s" and "th" are used, and "z" is rarely used.

Rules also varied between different people writing down different languages in Uganda and the rest of East Africa. For example, most Nilotic languages in and around Uganda spell the sound 'ch' (as in church) as "c", whereas in Bantu languages found in Uganda (excluding Swahili), this sound is generally spelled "ky" (but the y is pronounced).

There is some confusion between the use of "I" and "Y" where there is a vowel following. The general tendency is to assume that the "Y" sound comes from the conjunction of the vowels rather than being a separate letter, but not exclusively. But sometimes there are very similar words with different meanings:

'Edia' means 'boy'; 'edya', however, means 'vegetables', and any difference in pronunciation has more to do with tone and stress than with the "y".

== Vocabulary ==
Some common words and phrases:

- Hello! Ejoka? - literally "Is it good?"
- Hello! (response): Ejok-nooi
- Thank you (very much): Alakara (nooi) – literally "I am (very) happy"
- How are you (father/mother/child)? Ie-ia? (papa/toto/ikoku)? (literally, "Are you there?")
- How's it going? Anu ŋace? (literally "Which problems?")
- It's going well: Mam ŋace (literally "No problems.")
- See you! (as "good-bye") ikianyun!
- What is your name? Ŋai ekonikiro?
- My name is Lotiaŋ: Akakiro Lotiaŋ
- Yes: Ee
- No: Mam
- God: Akuj (feminine construction; root also means "north" and "up")
- Water: Ŋakipi
- Fire: Akim
- Goat: Akine
- Ox: Emoŋin
- Person: Ituŋanan
- People: Ŋitunga
- White person(s): Emusugut (m sing), amusugut (f sing), ŋimusugui (pl)
- Where are you going? Ai ilothi iyoŋ? OR Ai ilosi iyong?
- I am going to Kaaŋole: Alosi ayoŋ Kaaŋole.

The main books written in the language are the New Testament, published in significantly different Anglican and Roman Catholic versions in the 1960s, and a joint one published in the early 1990s. More recently, there have been some educational books and there are various grammars and dictionaries produced mainly by Roman Catholic religious. The Old Testament is in process with a number of books already completed.

== Notes ==
=== Works cited ===
- Lamphear, John (1976). The Traditional History of the Jie of Uganda. Clarendon Press. ISBN 978-0-19-821692-6.
- Lesley-Neuman, Diane (July 2007). ATR Harmony in Karimojong: Justification for a Stratal Optimality Theory (PDF) (PhD thesis). Boulder: University of Colorado. Archived from the original (PDF) on 22 July 2011 – via Rutgers Optimality Archive.

=== General references ===
- Logiro, P.; Ilukori, J. (2007). A Simplified Ngakarimojong-English English-Ngakarimojong Dictionary. Fountain Publishers. ISBN 978-9970-02-714-9.
- Novelli, Bruno (1985). A Grammar of the Karimojong Language. Berlin [West]: D. Reimer.
- Ekitabo ŋolo ka Akilip ŋolo a ŋituŋa dadaŋ ka ŋuna akorakin asakaramento Ka ŋace kiro ŋunapolok ikwaŋinapei akiiun a Ekanisa kaapei ka ŋice Kiruk ka ŋieothiyo (in kdj). London: Society for Promoting Christian Knowledge. 1957 – via Richard Mammana.
