= Moroto Town =

Moroto
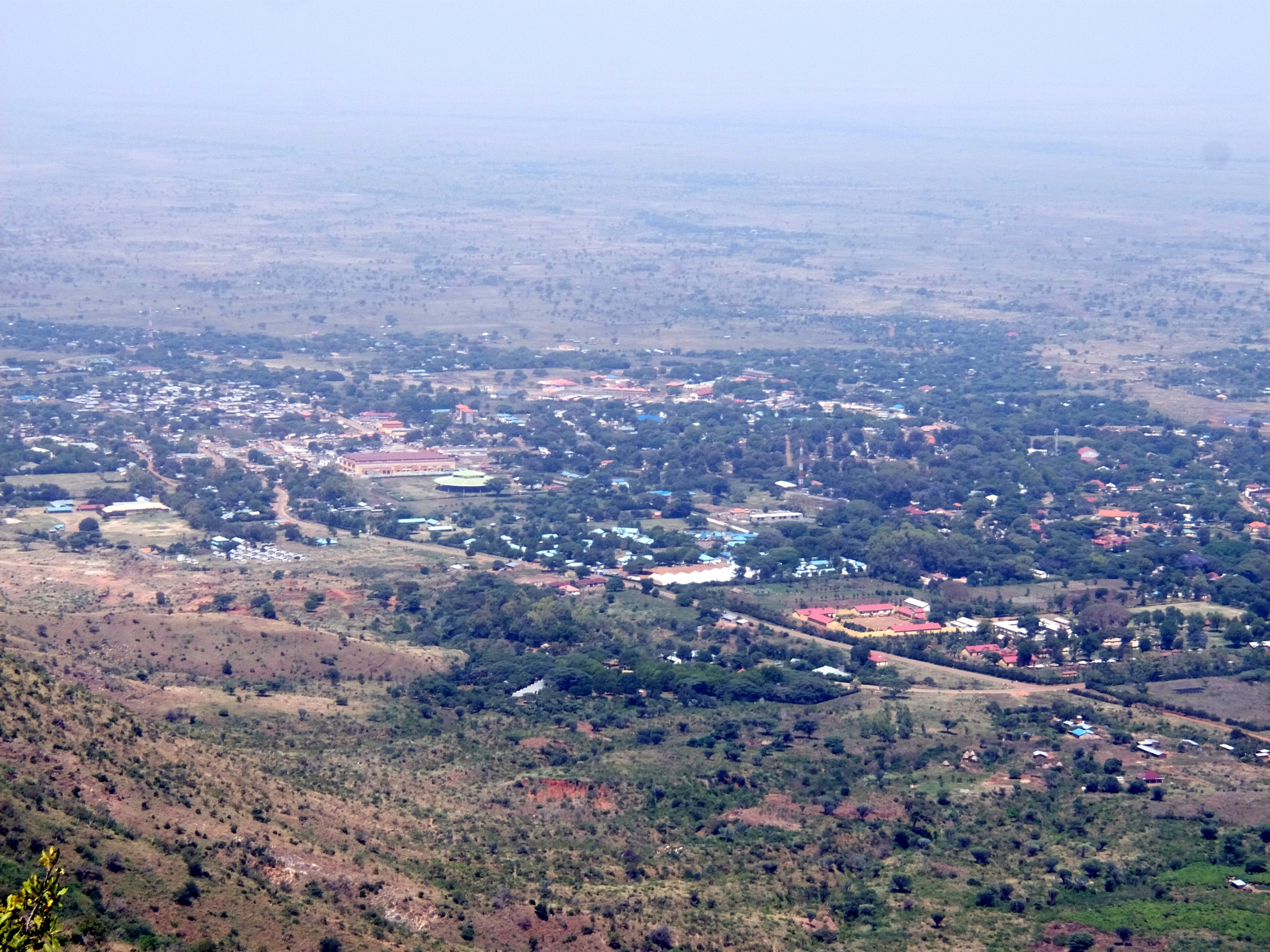
- Moroto Town - seen from Mount Moroto

- Location in Uganda
- Coordinates: 02°31′48″N 34°40′12″E
- Country: Uganda
- Region: Northern Region
- Sub-region: Karamoja sub-region
- District: Moroto District
- Elevation: 4,490 ft (1,370 m)

Population (2020 Estimate)
  - Total: 16,300

Moroto is a town in Moroto District in the Northern Region of Uganda. The town serves as the location of the district headquarters.

== Location ==
Moroto is approximately 316 kilometres (196 mi) east of Gulu, the largest city in the Northern Region of Uganda. It is about 271 kilometres (168 mi), by road, northeast of Mbale, the largest city in the Eastern Region of Uganda.

Moroto is located approximately 528 kilometres (328 mi), by road, northeast of Kampala, the capital and largest city of Uganda. The geographical coordinates of Moroto Town are 2°31'48.0"N, 34°40'12.0"E (Latitude:2.5300; Longitude:34.6700). Moroto sits at an average elevation of 1,370 metres (4,490 ft) above mean sea level.

== Population ==
The 2002 national census estimated the population of Moroto at 7,380. In 2010, the Uganda Bureau of Statistics (UBOS) estimated the population at 11,600. In 2011, UBOS estimated the mid-year population at 12,300.

In 2014, the national population census put the population of Moroto at 14,196. In 2020, UBOS estimated the mid-year population of the town at 16,300 people. The population agency calculated that the population of Moroto Town grew at an average annual rate of 2.39 percent between 2014 and 2020.

Historical population
Year	Pop.	±%
2002	7,380	—
2010	11,600	+57.2%
2011	12,300	+6.0%
2014	14,196	+15.4%
2020	16,300	+14.8%

== Transport ==
From the Moroto bus station, there are direct bus services to Kampala, Soroti, Mbale, Nakapiripirit, and other places in Uganda. The main road to Moroto is the Soroti-Moroto Road, which, as of January 2020, is fully paved. The Moroto–Nakapiripirit Road is fully paved as well. The town is also served by Moroto Airport, a public airport located about 8 kilometres (5 mi) west of downtown.

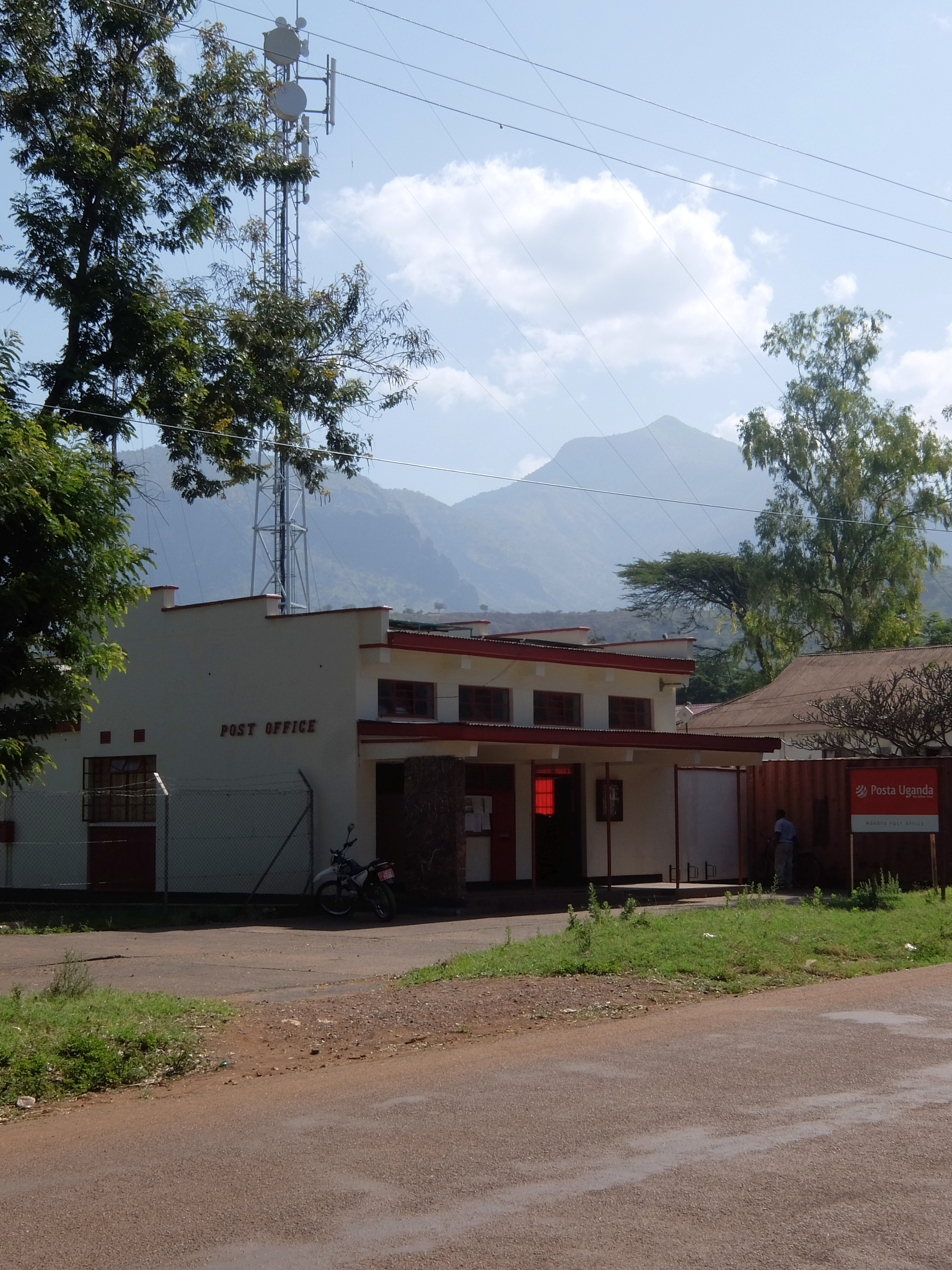
Moroto Post Office, with Mount Moroto in the background

== Points of interest ==
The additional points of interest lie within the town limits or near the edges of town: (1) the offices of Moroto Town Council (2) Mount Moroto, rising to an elevation of 3,083 metres (10,115 ft) about 3 kilometres (1.9 mi) east of town (3) Moroto central market (4) a branch of the National Social Security Fund (5) Moroto Regional Referral Hospital, a 200-bed regional referral hospital administered by the Uganda Ministry of Health (6) a branch of Centenary Bank and (7) a branch of Stanbic Bank Uganda Limited. (8) the headquarters of the Roman Catholic Diocese of Moroto, headed by Bishop Damiano Giulio Guzzetti.

== See also ==
- Karamoja sub-region
- List of cities and towns in Uganda
