= Karamojong people =

Nilotic ethnic group native to northeastern Uganda

Karamojong
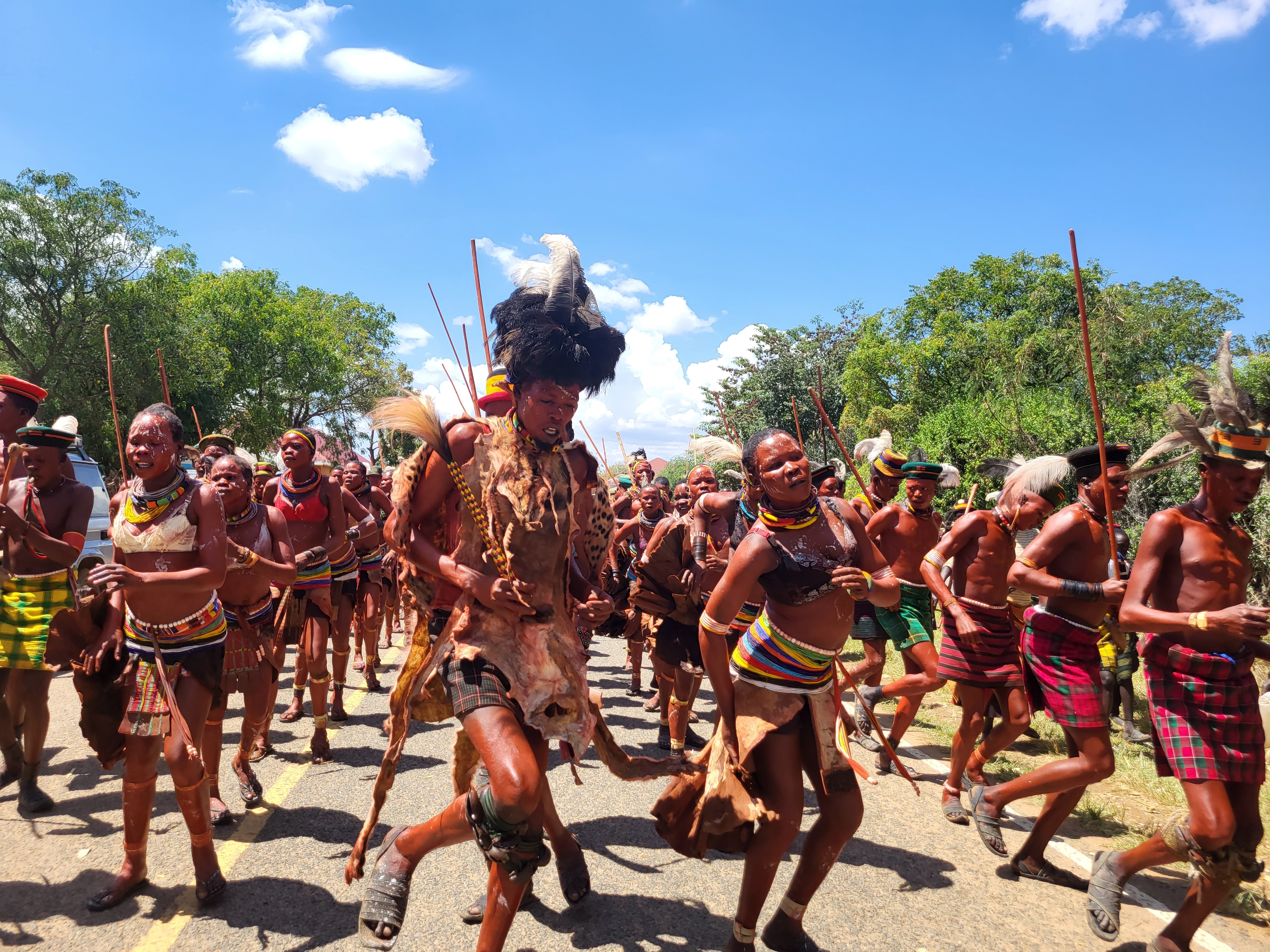
- The annual Karamojong cultural festival

Total population
- 475,000

Regions with significant populations
- Uganda: 371,713

Languages
- Karamojong language, English language

Religion
- Christianity, Traditional faith

Related ethnic groups
- Other Nilotic peoples

The Karamojong or Karimojong are a Nilotic ethnic group. They are agro-pastoral herders living mainly in the north-east of Uganda. Their language is also known as ngaKarimojong and is part of the Nilotic language family. Their population is estimated at 475,000 people.

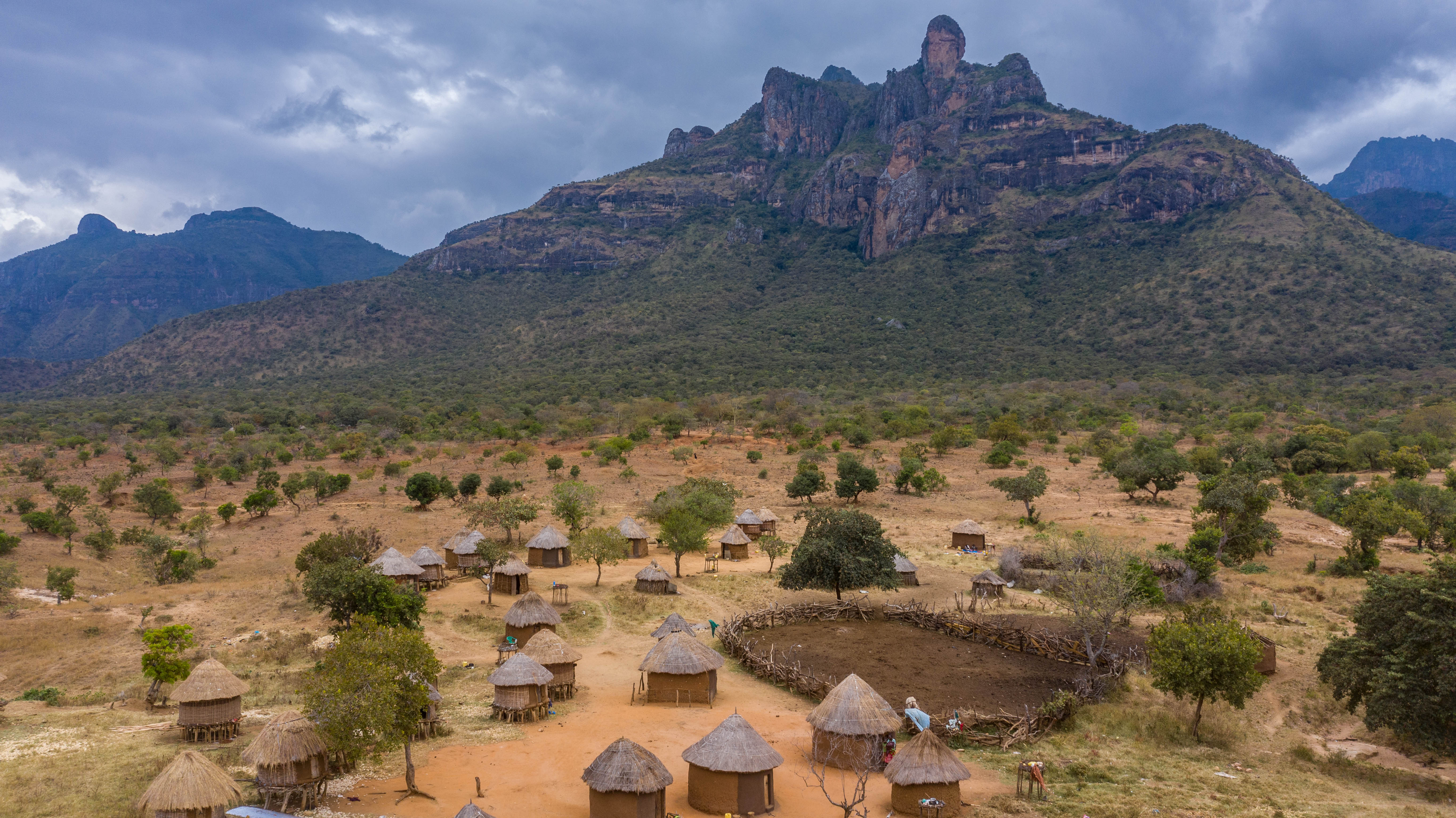
Pokot Settlement in Eastern Karamoja in Uganda

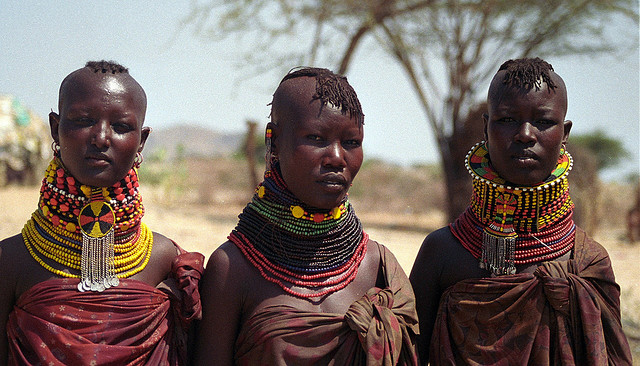
Karimojong girls in Northeastern Uganda

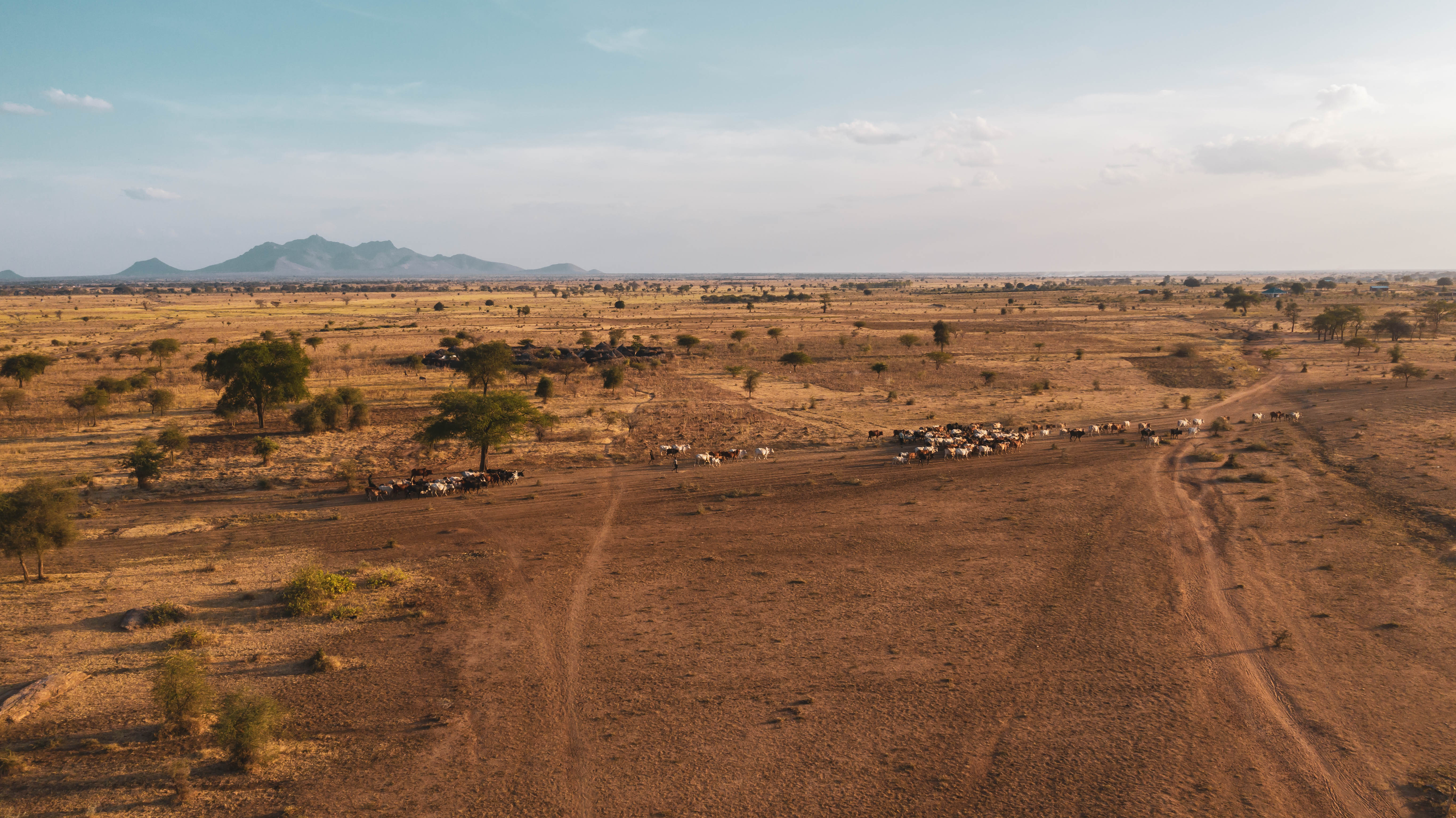
Free range cattle grazing in Karamoja North in reference to one of the causes of Cattle Raids

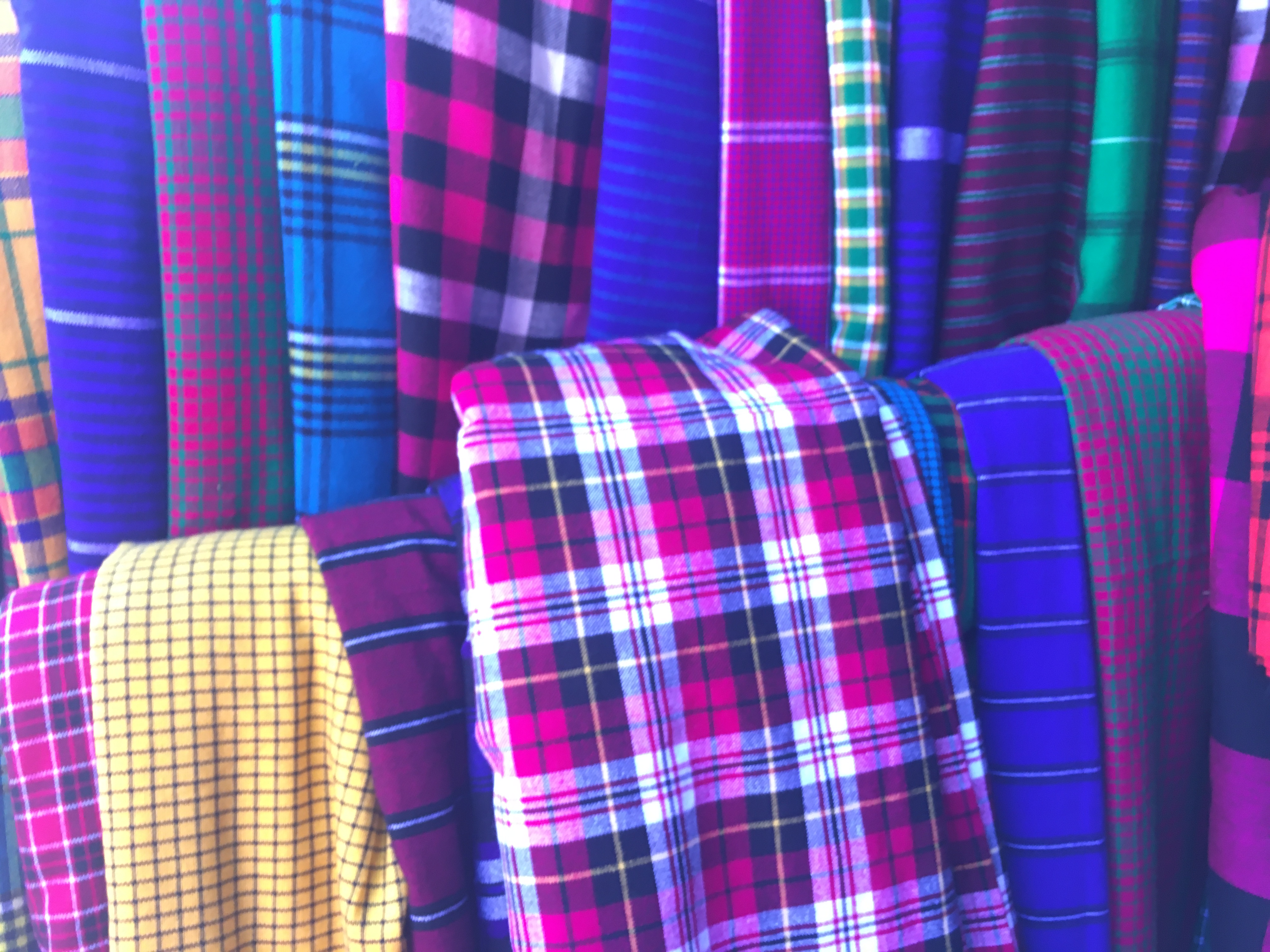
Sukas from Karamoja on display in Moroto

== History ==
The Karamojong live in the southern part of the region in the north-east of Uganda, occupying an area equivalent to one tenth of the country. According to anthropologists, the Karamojong are part of a group that migrated from present-day Ethiopia around 1600 A.D. and split into two branches, with one branch moving to present day Kenya to form the Kalenjin group and Maasai cluster. The other branch, called Ateker, migrated westwards. Ateker further split into several groups, including Turkana in present-day Kenya, Iteso, Dodoth, Jie, Karamojong, and Kumam in present-day Uganda, also Jiye and Toposa in southern Sudan all of them together now known as the "Teso Cluster" or "Karamojong Cluster".

It is said that the Karamojong were originally known as the Jie. The name Karamojong derived from the phrase "ekar ngimojong", meaning "the old men can walk no farther". According to tradition, the peoples now known as the Karamojong Cluster or Teso Cluster are said to have migrated from Abyssinia between the 1600 and 1700 AD as a single group. When they reached the area around the modern Kenyan-Ethiopian border, they are said to have fragmented into several groups including those that became Turkana, Toposa, and the Dodoth. The group that became known as the Toposa continued to present-day southern Sudan; the Dodoth settled in Apule in the northern part of present-day Karamoja. The Turkana settled in Kenya where they remain to this day and today's Jie of Uganda are thought to have split from them, moving up the escarpment into today's Kotido District. The main body continued southwards, reportedly consisting of seven groups or clans who settled in today's southern Karamoja, eventually merging to become the three clans now existing: the Matheniko in the east around Moroto mountain, the Pian in the south and the Bokora in the west. However, a significant sized group went west and formed the Iteso, the Kumam, and the Langi. It was this group who were said to have used the phrase "the old men can walk no farther".

Lygodactylus karamoja, a species of gecko described in 2023, is named after them.

== Language ==
Related to Turkana: in the Karamojong language, the people and the language have the convenient prefixes ŋi- and ŋa- respectively. Lack of a prefix indicates the land where they live. All the above-mentioned branches from Ateker speak languages that are mutually intelligible. The Lango in Uganda are also ethnically and genetically close to the ŋiKarimojong, evidenced by similar names among other things, though they adopted a dialect of the Luo language.

== Culture ==
The main livelihood activity of the Karamojong is herding livestock, which has social and cultural importance. Crop cultivation is a secondary activity, undertaken only in areas where it is practicable.

Due to the arid climate of the region, the Karamojong have always practised a sort of pastoral transhumance, where for 3–4 months in a year, they move their livestock to the neighboring districts in search of water and pasture for their animals.

The availability of food and water is always a concern and affects the Karamojong's interaction with other ethnic groups.

== Social organization ==
The dominant feature of Karamojong society is their age system, which is strictly based on generation. As successive generations have an increasing overlap in age, this leads logically to a breakdown of the system, which appears to have occurred after rules were relaxed in the nineteenth century among their close Neighbours, the Jie. However, the Karamojong system is flexible enough to contain a build-up of tension between generations over a cycle of 50 years or so. When this can no longer be resolved peacefully, the breakdown in order leads to a switch in power from the ruling generation to their successors and a new status quo. The next changeover was expected around 2013.

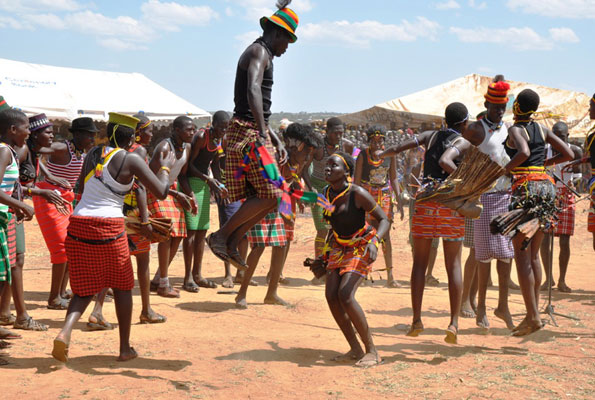
This is a traditional dance that involves jumping and body shaking performed by the Karimojong people in North Eastern Uganda on functions including weddings, calamity cleansing.

As both a rite of passage into manhood, as well as a requirement for engagement, a young Karamojong man is required to wrestle the woman he desires to marry. If he is successful in winning the wrestling match against the woman, he is now considered to be a man and is permitted to marry the woman. This ensures that the man will be strong enough to care for and protect his wife. After a successful match, the dowry negotiations are allowed to commence. In an instance where the young man is unable to defeat the woman in the wrestling match, he will not be considered by his people to be a man and will often leave to marry a woman from a different people-group where a test of strength is not required. If a non-Karamojong man desires to marry a Karamojong woman, he is also required to go through this ceremony.

Karamojong traditional dance is remarkable and has stood the test of time.

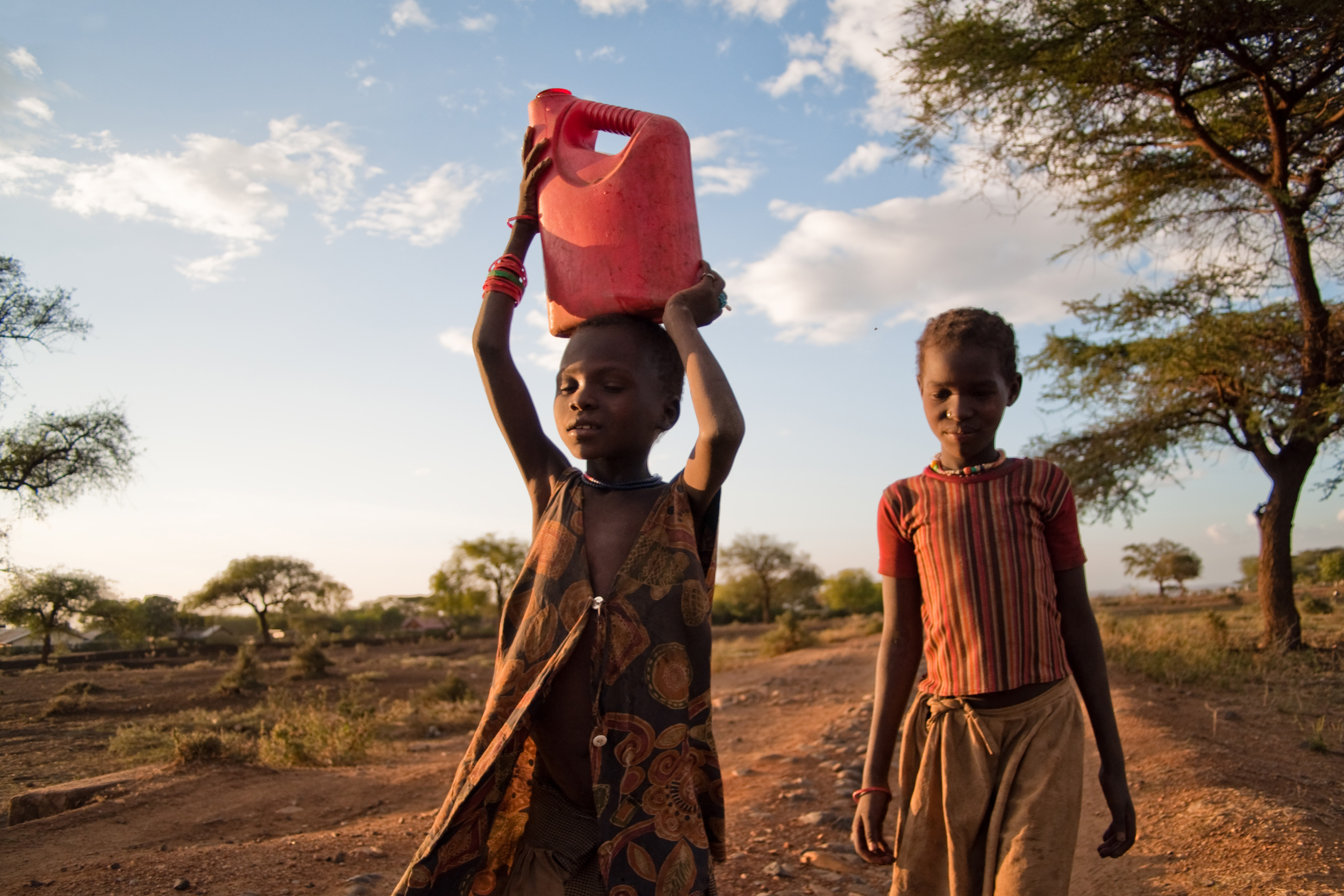
Two Karamojong children (2009)

== Conflicts ==
The Karamojong have been involved in various conflicts centered on the practice of cattle raids.

The Karamojong are in constant conflict with their neighbors in Uganda, South Sudan and Kenya due to frequent cattle raids. This is because cattle are an important element in the negotiations for a bride and young men use the raids as a rite of passage and way of increasing their herds to gain status. In recent years the nature and the outcome of the raids have become increasingly violent with the acquisition of AK47s by the Karamojong.

The Ugandan government has attempted to disarm the Karamojong but they have been reluctant to give up their weapons due to a need to defend themselves against cross-border cattle raids. The Department for Karamoja Affairs was established by the Ugandan government to address the special needs of the area; in 2000, it was estimated that the Karamojong people had between 100,000 and 150,000 weapons. In December 2000, the Ugandan government passed the Disarmament Act that offered iron sheets and plows in exchange for the weapons. The Karamojong were resistant to the idea; fewer than 10,000 weapons were ever recovered.

The Karamojong have been continually discriminated against in the modern era, first for resisting British colonizers in what is now Uganda, and in the late 20th and 21st centuries for maintaining underdeveloped villages compared to more urban parts of the country. Then-Prime Minister Milton Obote famously said in 1963 "We shall not wait for Karamoja to develop," advocating for the Ugandan government to effectively abandon their fellow countrymen.

== See also ==
- Acholi
- Buganda
- Gisu
- Lango
- Teso
