= Karenga District =

- District
- Location of Karenga District in Uganda
- Coordinates: 3.5690813°N 33.6930855°E
- Country: Uganda
- Region: Northern Region
- Sub-region: Karamoja
- Created: 15 June 2019
- Operational: 1 July 2019
- Capital: Karenga

Government
  - Type: District Council
  - Chief Administrative Officer: Uma Charles Okot
  - Chairperson LCV: Samule Abukongimole Lobeka

Area
  - Total: 3,193 km^{2} (1,233 sq mi)

Population (2023 (est.))
  - Total: 73,100
  - Density: 22.89/km^{2} (59.3/sq mi)
- Time zone: UTC+3 (EAT)
- Website: karenga.go.ug

'Karenga District is a district in Northern Uganda, in the Karamoja sub-region. The district headquarter is located in Karenga town. It was carved out of Kaabong District and became operational on July 1, 2019. The district has two constituencies: Dodoth West and Napore West. It borders South Sudan and Kaabong District. The population is 84,100, divided over 7 sub-counties and 3 town councils.

Karenga District is located in the vicinity of Kidepo Valley National Park.
