= Karamoja =

Sub-region of Uganda

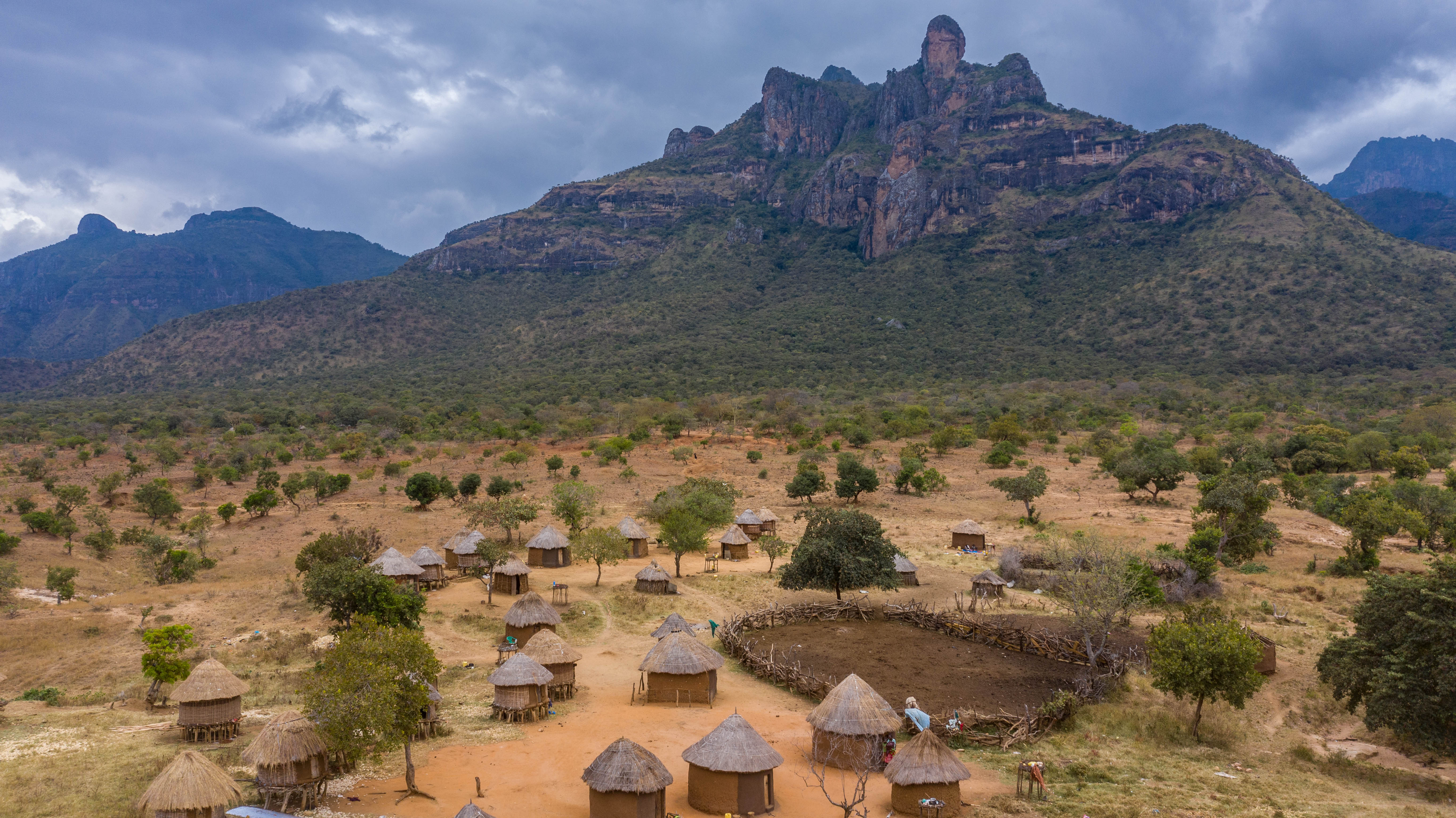
Pokot Settlement in Eastern Karamoja in Uganda

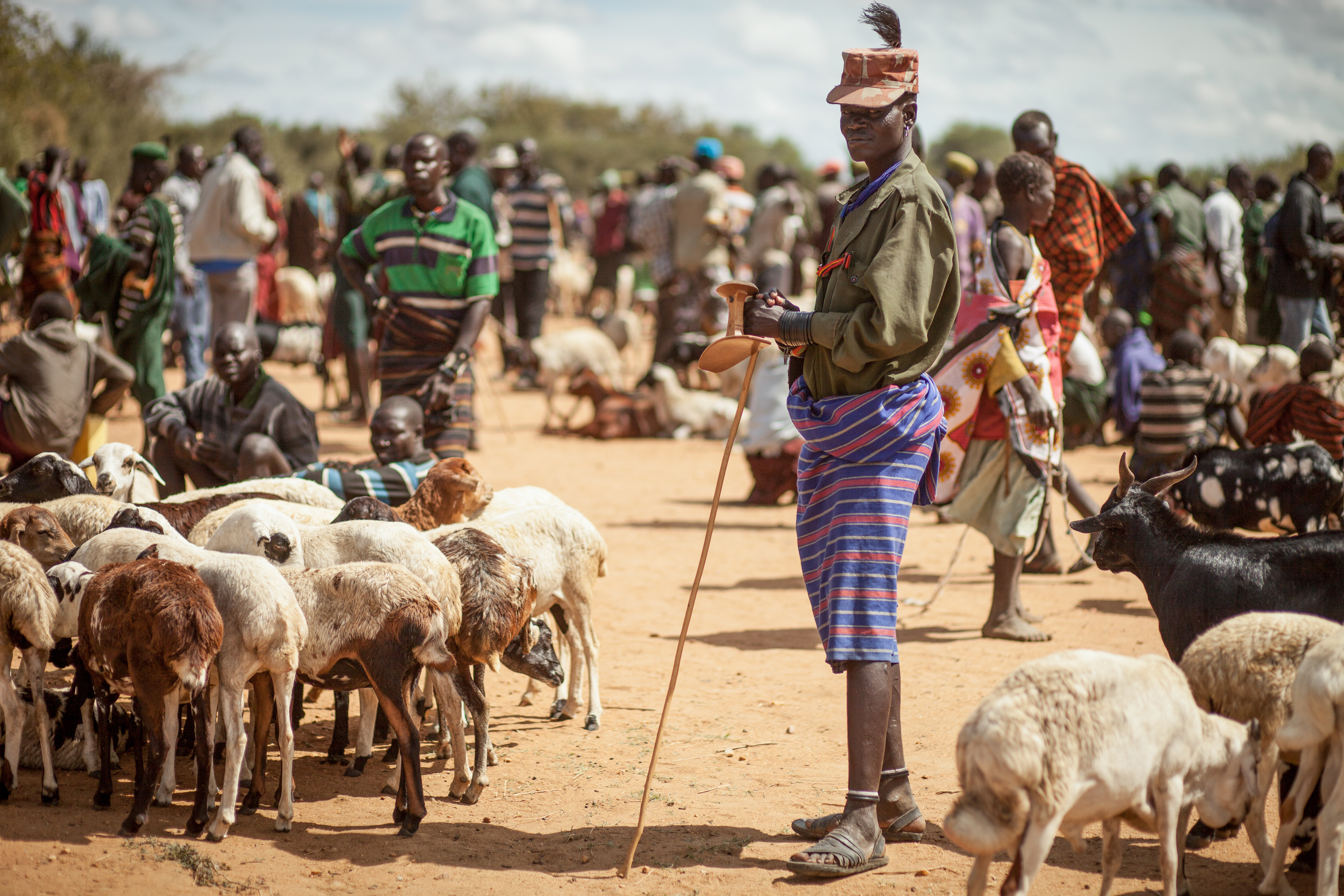
Karamojong shepherd

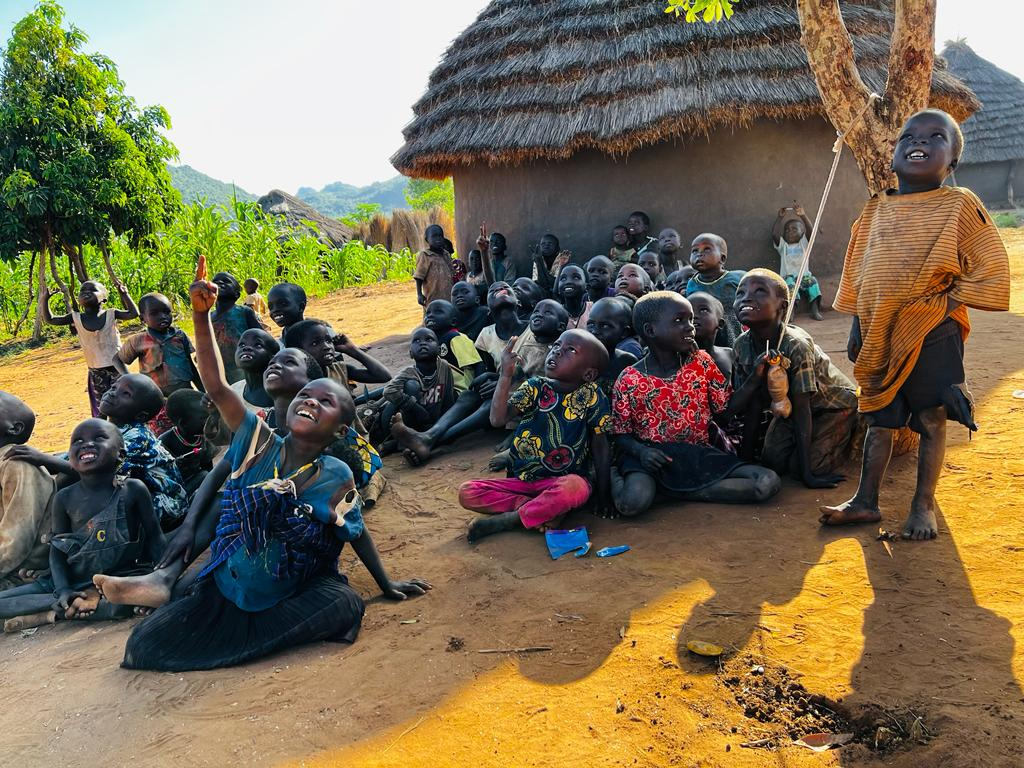
Children gathered outside a traditional thatched-roof house in Karamoja region while gazing at the flying drone in the clear sky.

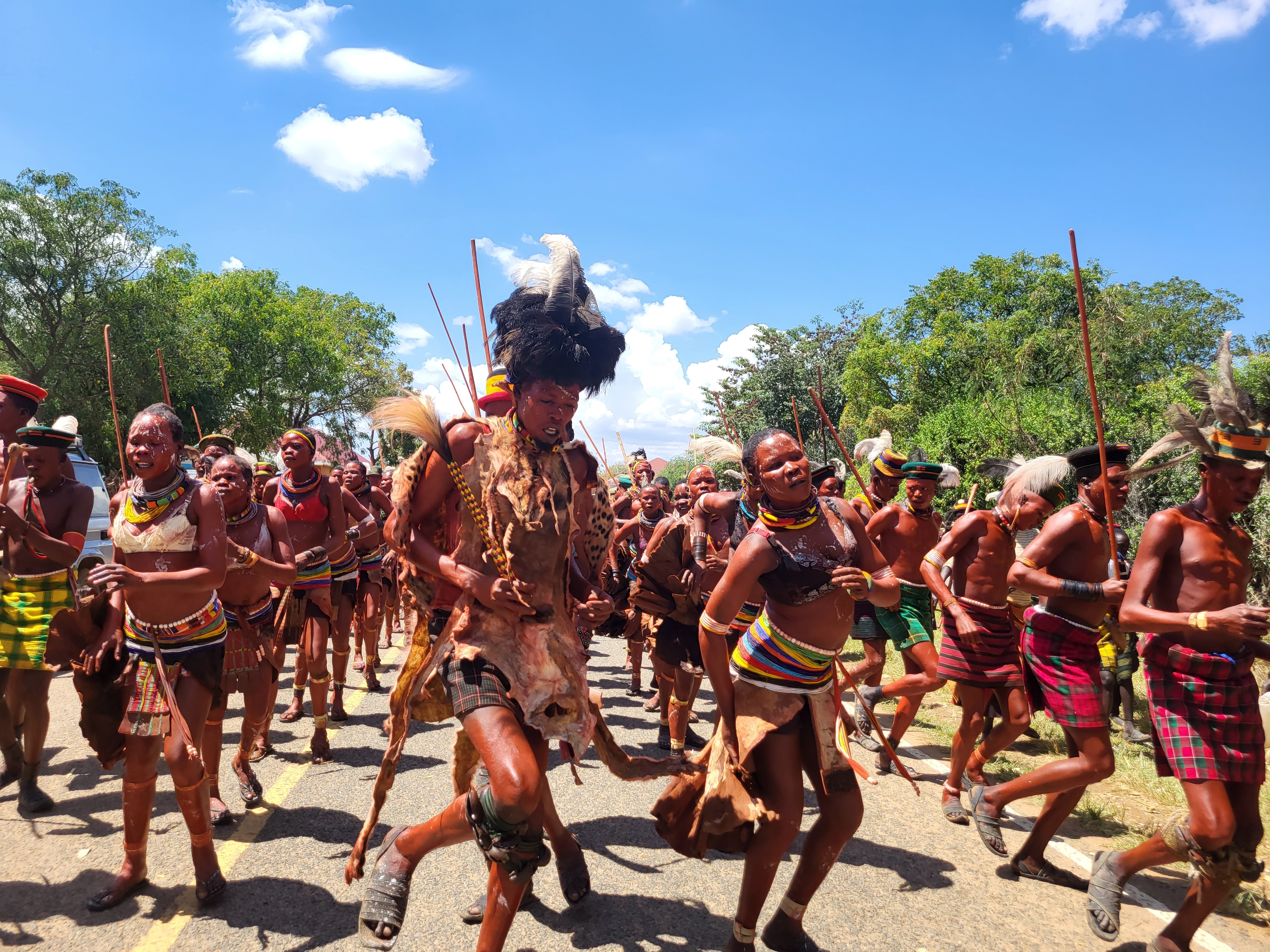
The annual Karamojong cultural festival

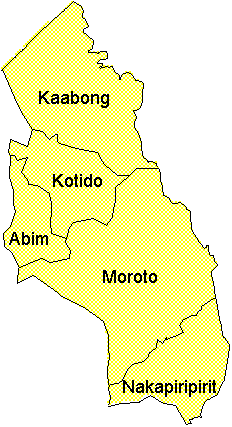
Districts of Karamoja

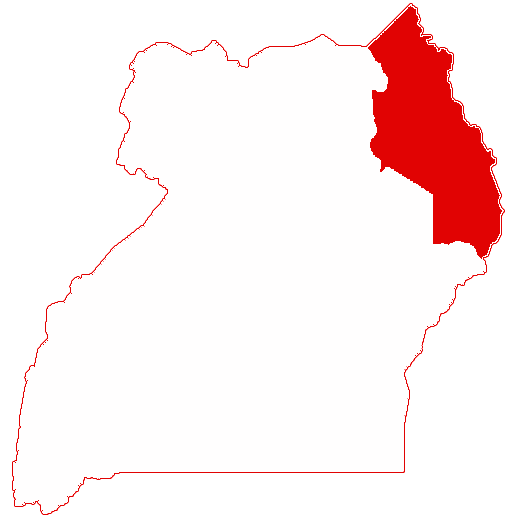
Location in Uganda

The Karamoja sub-region, commonly known as Karamoja, is a region in Uganda. It covers an area of 27,528km and comprises the Kotido District, Kaabong District, Karenga District, Nabilatuk District, Abim District, Moroto District, Napak District, Amudat District and Nakapiripirit District. The region is projected to have a population of 1.4 millions in 2022 by UBOS.

== Geography ==
In 2011, the Karamoja sub-region was the site of an important fossil discovery. Paleontologists discovered the remains of Ugandapithecus major, a 20-million-year-old ancestor of present-day primates. "It is a highly important fossil and it will certainly put Uganda on the map in terms of the scientific world," said Martin Pickford, one of the researchers involved in the discovery.

== History ==
The region was ruled by the British from 1916 to 1962. The famine that struck the region in 1980 was, in terms of mortality rates, one of the worst in history. 21% of the population died, including 60% of the infants.

== Armed conflict ==
As pastoralism and conflict are strongly interrelated, the integrated management of natural resources, like pasture, livestock and water becomes crucial. In terms of economic activity, the region depends on cattle rearing, mining, and trading in agricultural produce with neighboring districts. In mid-2006, as first reported by Inner City Press and then by The New Vision, the United Nations Development Programme halted its disarmament programs in Karamoja in response to human rights abuses in the parallel forcible disarmament programs carried out by the Uganda People's Defence Force (UPDF). There have been reports of atrocities and many civilian victims of the disarmament, as army forces and nomadic warriors clashed. The disarmament campaign usually involves the UPDF surrounding manyatas (villages) and evacuating people from the interior, prior to orchestrating searches for hidden weapons. In September 2007, Human Rights Watch released a 97-page report detailing alleged torture and even killings of children. However, this report also acknowledged that the UPDF's high command was attempting to address discipline problems, partly by providing human rights training, which had, by the time of the publication, led to cordon-and-search operations becoming "markedly less violent."

There were a number of significant clashes between the UPDF and nomadic warriors in 2010. The UN High Commissioner for Human Rights, Navi Pillay, said in June 2010 that at least 19 people had been killed in two incidents on 4–7 January and 22 January, when the army used a helicopter gunship and ground forces against warrior communities, before a third incident, on 24 April, which resulted in at least 10 deaths. She claimed that the death toll from all three incidents was, most likely, even higher than the confirmed numbers she quoted. She called for the opening of an impartial inquiry into the attacks.

By early 2011, the UPDF said it was starting to scale down its military operations in Karamoja. It claimed to have largely cleared the region of illegal weapons. However, in 2011, fresh allegations of torture carried out by the army in Karamoja were recorded by journalists working on a Pulitzer Center-funded project.

== Human development ==
Human welfare, living conditions and quality of life of the people in Karamoja have declined considerably due to various factors such as environmental issues, insecurity, marginalization, illiteracy, poor health, and poor infrastructure. Moroto and Nakapiripirit have the lowest Human Development Index (HDI) of 0.183 and Kotido has 0.194 as compared to an average of 0.4491 for Uganda.

The districts of Karamoja have the highest Human Poverty Indices (HPI) with Nakapiripirit and Moroto Districts having 63.5 percent and Kotido has 53.8 percent, compared to the national average of 37.5 percent, Central region of 31.5 percent, Northern region 46.1 percent, Western region 39.0 percent, and Eastern region 37.1 percent. There are at least 5 regional hospitals in Karamoja, providing affordable health services to the area. The locations include Matany, Moroto, Amudat, Kotido, and Kaabong.

Poverty is increasing and according to the Karimojong, the main factors responsible for poverty include persistent poor harvest as a result of dry spells and droughts, cattle rustling and insecurity, animal death, lack of water, poor farming practices, ill health and disability, high bride price for marriage, lack of skills and unemployment, limited sources of income, poor governance, and landlessness.

The 1980 famine in Karamoja was, in terms of mortality rates, one of the worst in history. Twenty-one percent of the population died, including 60 percent of infants.

Much of Karamoja remained heavily dependent on the largesse of the United Nations World Food Programme, as the region entered the second decade of the 21st century.

In 2011, in the wake of the severe 2011 Eastern Africa drought, food shortages were again reported in the region as well as other areas in northern and eastern Uganda. Karamoja and the Bulambuli district, in particular, were among the worst hit areas, with an estimated 1.2 million Ugandans affected. The Ugandan government also indicated that as of September 2011, acute deficits in foodstuffs were expected in 35 of the country's districts. Droughts and dry spells affect farmers and the population, causing economic hardship for farmers and food shortages for the population and their livestock. Droughts can be accompanied by a heat wave, causing deaths and illness.

== Language and ethnicity ==
The Karimojong are part of the Karimojong Cluster of Nilotic tribes (also known as the Teso Cluster). The languages of the Jie and Dodoth are not quite the same as, but mutually intelligible with Karimojong. The ethnicity of the Ethur is not entirely certain, but they are regarded as essentially Nilotic (if mixed) and their language is regarded as a Luo dialect. The Ik and Tepeth have their own languages, but these are under great pressure from the Karimojong language (Ŋakarimojong) around them.
