= Traditional Kalenjin society =

Kalenjin tribal society in East Africa

Traditional Kalenjin society is the way of life that existed among the Kalenjin-speaking people prior to the advent of the colonial period in Kenya and after the decline of the Chemwal, Lumbwa and other Kalenjin communities in the late 1700s and early 1800s.

The Kalenjin semi-nomadic pastoralist tradition centered on the raising of cattle, sheep and goats and cultivating sorghum and pearl millet is of long standing. It has been dated back as far as the last millennium BC when Kalenjin-speaking communities first arrived in Kenya.

== Geographic extent and divisions ==
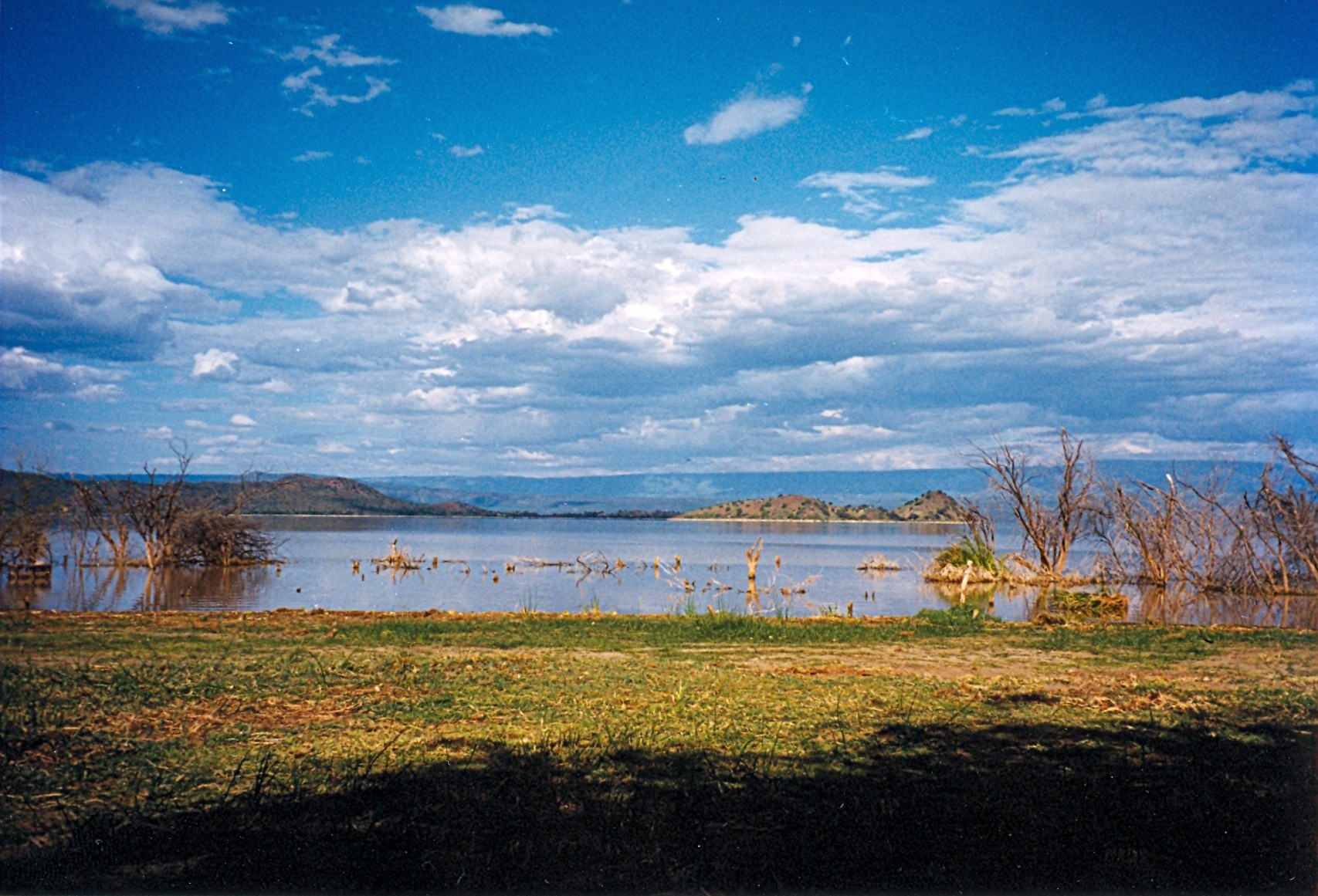
The areas around Lake Baringo are home to a number of Kalenjin sections

The Kalenjin traditionally occupied, and still form the ethnic majority in, parts of geographical Western Kenya and the Rift Valley. The Kipsigis live in areas centered around Bomet, Kericho, the Nandi around Kapsabet, the Keiyo and Markweta in Kerio Valley and Cherangany Hills. The Tugen inhabit North and South Baringo, the Sabaot and Sebeei areas around Mount Elgon and the Pokot the northern side of Mount Elgon and areas north of Lake Baringo.

Kalenjin territory as a whole was not recognised as a geographic locality; however, the various Kalenjin sub-tribes had a similar set of classifications of geographic localities within their respective tribal lands.

=== Em/emet ===
Em or emet, equivalent to county, was the highest recognised geographic division among the Kalenjin sections. This unit was identifiable as a political institution but the main work of civil control and administration was done by the kokwotinwek (plural of kokwet). Linguistic evidence indicates that this form of societal organisation dates back to their Southern Nilotic heritage. It is believed that the Southern Nilotes of two thousand years ago cooperated in loose supra-clan groupings, called *e:m.

=== Bororiet ===
This level of governance was unique to the Nandi section of the Kalenjin. The civil council of the bororiet consisted of elders from the senior-age grades of its constituent kokwotinwek. It functioned only to settle problems of common concern to the kokwotinwek, such as inter-kokwet disputes and matters which a kokwet had failed to settle satisfactorily.

=== Kok/kokwet ===
The kokwet was the most significant political and judicial unit among the Kalenjin. The governing body of each kokwet was its kokwet council; the word kokwet was in fact variously used to mean the whole neighbourhood, its council and the place where the council met.

The kokwet elders were the local authority for allocating land for cultivation; they were the body to whom the ordinary member of the tribe would look for a decision in a dispute or problem which defied solution by direct agreement between the parties.

== Genealogical divisions ==
Traditional Kalenjin society was divided into oret (clans). Some of the more widespread ortinuek include Toyoi, Tungo, Talai and Kapchepkendi. The members of the clans did not necessarily have a blood tie in common since immigrants into Kalenjin lands would often be accepted into an existing clan. The most notable example of this is the acceptance of members of the Segelai Maasai into the Talai clan among the Nandi.

== Social divisions ==
According to the Kalenjin social system, the male sex is divided into boys, warriors and elders. The female sex is divided into girls and married women. The first stage began at birth and continued till initiation.

=== Age set (ipinda) ===
All boys who were circumcised together are said to belong to the same ipinda. These age sets played a significant role in traditional Kalenjin society since they were used to record time. Once the young men of a particular ipinda came of age, they were tasked with protecting the tribal lands and the society, the period when they were in charge of protection of the society was known as the age of that ipinda. There were eight ages in general though this varied between sections as an age-set would temporarily be dropped from use if a disastrous occurrence occurred during the age of the ipinda.

As late as the early 1900s, the central Kalenjin groups initiated the same age-set concurrently while the outlying groups were one or at most two steps out of phase. It has been suggested that such synchronization suggests that most or all Kalenjin groups constituted not merely an ethno-linguistic category but a single information-sharing system.

In contemporary times, the age-set system has become a central focus of various academic studies that try to correlate the method with the Western system of time-reckoning in order to better place historical narratives in time.

==== Age set names ====
Sebei	Maina	Chumo	Sowe	Koronkoro	Kwoimet	Kaplelaich	Nyikeao	Nyonki
Sabaot (Kony)	Maina	Chumo	Sawe	Korongoro	Kipkoimet	Kaplelach	Kimnyikeu	Nyongi
Sabaot (Pok)	Sowo	Maina	Gabaiyak	Korongoro	?*	Gamnenac	Gamnyikewa	Nyongiik
Nandi	Maina	Chuma	Sawe	-	Kipkoiimet	Kaplelach	Kimnyigei	Nyongi
Kipsigis	Maina	Chuma	Sawe	Korongoro	-	Kaplelach	Kipnyigei	Nyongi
Keiyo	Maina	Chuma	Sowe	Korongoro	Kipkoimet	Kablelach	Kimnyegeu	Nyongi
Marakwet	Maina	Chumo	Sowe	Korongoro/ Kipkoimet	Kaberur	Kaplelach	Kimnyigeu	Nyongi
Tugen	-	Chumo	Sowe	Korongoro	Kipkoimet	Kablelech	Kimnikeu	Nyonki
Pokot	Maina	Chumwo	Sowe	Korongoro	Kipkoimet	Kaplelach	Murkutwo	Nyongi

- *La Fontaine states there are eight "age classes" but lists seven names, the order of which is questionable.

== Governance and military ==
Among the Kalenjin, there were no chiefs of any form. Each village or kok, usually had a headman, celebrated for his wisdom or his wealth or both. He was henceforth distinguished by the name Ki-ruwok-in.

The Nandi adopted the Sengwer system of governance in the early 19th century, selecting an Orkoiyot who held precisely the same position as the Maasai Laibon; that is to say, he was the supreme chief of the entire Nandi section. The Kipsigis would adopt this system of governance from the Nandi in the late 19th century.

=== Military ===
==== Weapons ====
The arms of the fighting men usually consisted of a spear, shield, sword and club. By the late 19th century, up to four kinds of spears, representing various eras and areas were in use. In Nandi, the eren-gatiat of the Sirkwa era was still in use, though only by old men. It had a short and small leaf-shaped blade with a long socketed shank and a long butt. Two types of the Maasai-era spear, known as ngotit, were also in use. Those of the eastern, northern and southern counties had long narrow blades with long iron butt, short socket and short shaft. Those of the central county (emgwen) had short broad blades with short iron butts. In the western counties, a spear that had a particularly small head, a long shaft and no butt was in use, known as ndirit. The pastoral Pokot carried two Maasai-era spears, known as ngotwa, while the agricultural sections armed themselves with a sword, known as chok.

== Economy ==
The Kalenjin society was to a large extent self-sufficient in its needs and a significant amount of intra-tribal trade catered for basic wants.

=== Hunter client ===
A distinct pattern of trade in traditional Kalenjin economy was the hunter client relationship that was adopted during the Sirikwa era. Within this arrangement, the Okiek would provide produce of the forest that would be exchanged with the Kalenjin for produce of the land. Notable products in this exchange were honey, elephant ivory and rhino horn.

=== Smithing ===
By the early 20th century, there were a number of smiths (kitongik) in Nandi who spoke both Nandi and Maasai. The smiths gave the following account of their arrival: "After they had lost all their cattle from various causes, the Uasin Gishu Maasai quitted their homes and split up in different directions. Some of those who wandered into Nandi were hospitably received by Arap Sutek who was the only smith in Nandi at the time.

=== Money ===
The Kalenjin did not mint their own currency; however, by the late 19th century, and possibly earlier, the rupee (rupiet), pice (pesaiyat) and cent (olkisoiyet) were in use among the Kalenjin.

=== Trade ===
Intra-Kalenjin trade	Imports	Exports
Kipsigis	-	-
Nandi	tobacco pipes, iron wire, iron chain, brass wire, white beads and white cloth	livestock, ivory
Tugen	cattle, goats and pottery	grain and honey
Keiyo	grain and honey	cattle, goats and pottery
Pokot	grain and honey	cattle, goats and pottery
Sabaot (Kony, Pok, Somek, Sabiny)	-	-
Terik	-	medical services (major operations)
Trade with neighboring tribes
Maasai	swords, spears and magical services	livestock
Okiek	fruits, game meat, leopard and monkey skins, honey and ivory	livestock
Kisii	grains	livestock
Luhya	grains and tobacco pipes^{1}	livestock
Trade with Eastern Kenya markets
Swahili	iron wire, iron chain, brass wire, white beads & white cloth	ivory

1. Primarily with the Nandi, the Kipsigis made a liquid snuff which was kept in a snuff box.

== Religious beliefs ==
=== Religious pillars ===
Three major religious pillars (the sun, thunder and lightning, and living spirits) were explained to have a bearing on Kalenjin religious beliefs. However, additional pillars that include wild game and human specialists were included recently. All these pillars are subsumed within Kalenjin fears and psychologies controlled by taboos and superstitions.

=== Asis – the Supreme Being ===
The Kalenjin were monotheistic worshippers of one Supreme Being—as were many African ethnic groups.

=== Names of God ===
The main names for the Supreme Being in Kalenjin mythology were Asis and Cheptalel though other names were also used. For example, the Sabaot used the name Yeeyiin, the Suk used Iilat, the Marakwet used Chebet chebo Chemataw ('daughter of the day'), Cheptalil ('the one who shines') and Chibo Yim ('man of the sky'). Research has found over twelve main names which the Kipsigis used for the deity of their traditional worship. The various names were used to indicate the salanik, the attributes of their deity, much like Jah, Jehovah and Adonai are used in Judeo-Christian faith.

=== Deities ===
Kalenjin natural philosophy describes two principal deities, Asis and Ilat. Among the southern sections of the Kalenjin, however, there are three principal supernatural beings since Ilat's dual nature is identified as two separate deities, Ilet ne-mie and Ilet ne-ya.

Ilat/Ilet is associated with thunder and rain. He is said to inhabit deep pools and waterfalls and that the rainbow is his discarded garments. Among the Nandi, Ilet ne-mie and Ilet ne-ya respectively are good and a bad thunder gods. The crashing of thunder near at hand is said to be Ilet ne-ya trying to come to earth to kill people while the distant rumbling of thunder is Ilet ne-mie protecting man by driving away his namesake. Forked lightning is the sword of Ilet ne-ya, while sheet lightning is said to be the sword of Ilet ne-mie.

=== Places of worship ===
The Kalenjin traditionally did not build a structure for worship, "as it was felt that this would have reduced His power and would have limited it to a particular building". They did, however, have three main places of traditional worship.

- Kaapkoros, which was a hilltop set aside for worship by the Kalenjin. When the Kalenjin or the various sections would settle at a place, one hilltop would be set aside for worship. As the tribe expanded and people moved further away from this point, other hilltops would be set aside as being sacred. Evidently, the first kaapkoros took place very soon after the Kalenjin settled in Kenya—or even long before that time. People gathered on average once a year at kaapkoros, where worship would be led by the priests, known as Tisiik.
- Mabwaita is a term used by the Kipsigis section for the family altar or prayer tree which was positioned to the east of the house as one exited from the door. The Nandi and Keiyo sections called it korosyoot. This was a duplicate of the one at kaapkoros and was the centre for worship and ceremonies connected with the home and family.
- Sach ooraan is a Kalenjin term used for the intersection of two or more paths or roads. Sach ang'wan is used for the place where four paths or roads branch off. Years ago when a crossroad was being used for a ceremony or practice, it was considered to be a shrine. It was remembered ever afterwards that the spot had been used for the removal of something bad. Children were not allowed to go near a shrine at an intersection. Casting a leaf at sach ooraan was a form of prayer to Asis to drive away disease.

== Traditional knowledge ==
=== Kamuratanet ===
Kamuratanet is a Kalenjin traditional process of teaching its members appropriate behavior, knowledge, skills, attitudes, virtues, religion and moral standards. Kamuratanet provides parameters that are used to determine what is acceptable and normal and what is not acceptable, and therefore abnormal. Though carried out throughout an individual's lifetime, it is formalized during yatitaet (circumcision) and subsequent tumdo (initiation).

=== Medicine ===
Traditional Kalenjin medicine recognized both supernatural and technical skills, with male practitioners more associated with the former and female practitioners with the latter. When a person fell ill, it was attributed to an angry spirit, often of a relation, and a cleansing ceremony was performed following which treatment was carried out. Medicines were made out of bark, roots and leaves of various trees and plants. Surgery was practiced and limbs skillfully set and amputated. Cupping therapy was frequently made use of and wounds were at times cauterized using a fire-stick.

==== Chepkerichot ====
The Nandi chepkerichot corresponds to an ordinary medical practitioner. In fact, Nandi doctors of the 21st century are called chepkerichot. Both males and females could attend this role, except in the special class of midwives (kork'ap sikis) which were attended to only by females. Though they charged fees, these were not payable unless or until the patient recovered. The medicinal properties and preparations of plants were a secret handed down from father to son or from mother to daughter. The Nandi chepkerichot could perform minor operations including bleeding, cupping and bone-setting but in the case of major operations, a specialist was called in from Terik. In the early 20th century it was noted that the Terik "specialists perform(ed) operations of some magnitude".

=== Astronomy ===
Pokot knowledge of various heavenly bodies has been captured within Kalenjin mythology. Among the Nandi, some of these terms are shared. The Milky Way is known as Poit'ap kechei (literally 'sea of stars'), the morning star Tapoiyot, the midnight star Kokeliet, and Orion's belt Kakipsomok. The Milky Way was traditionally perceived as a great lake in which children are bathing and playing. However, there are indications that there was an awareness of the movement of the stars. For instance, the Evening star is called the Okiek's star – Kipokiot – because it was by its appearance, in times past, that the wives of the Okiek knew that their husbands were shortly to return home. Further, there are indications that this movement of stars was sometimes linked to earthly concerns. Here, it was by the appearance or non-appearance of the Pleiades – Koremerik – that the Nandi knew whether or not to expect a good or a bad harvest. Sometimes superstitions were held regarding certain events. A halo – ormarichet – was traditionally said to represent a cattle stockade. At least as of the early 20th century, a break occurring on the east side was considered to be unlucky while one on the west side was seen to be lucky. A comet – cheptapisiet or kipsaruriet – was at the same time regarded as the precursor of a great misfortune.

== Customs ==
=== Initiation ===
The practice of initiation straddled many aspects of traditional Kalenjin society, being a cycle in the traditional calendar (roughly equivalent to a century) and playing a significant role in military tradition during the Maasai era.

The Nandi have a tradition that the first man who practiced circumcision in Nandi is said to have been one Kipkenyo who came from a country called Do (other accounts To, indicating the intervocalic Kalenjin *d sound – closest pronunciation Tto).

The story goes that Kipkenyo had a number of brothers and sisters who all died when they reached puberty, so Kipkenyo decided when he had a number of children of his own to 'change' them all at this age. He therefore circumcised them, and as none of his children died, the Nandi followed his example, with the result that circumcision became general.

— Hollis, A. C., The Nandi – Their Language and Folklore, 1909

This corresponds with linguistic studies which indicate a period of significant cultural transfer between Southern Nilotes and Eastern Cushities prior to Southern Nilotic entry into western Kenya.

Linguistic studies place this point of cultural interaction at a place located near the common border between the Sudan, Uganda, Kenya, and Ethiopia. This corresponds with the location mentioned in the narrative i.e. Tuluet-ap-Seike (today Mt Sekker).

=== Marriage ===
A man was usually in his mid-twenties when he married. As males were circumcised only at twelve- to fifteen-year intervals, the youngest age for circumcision of boys was about thirteen years old. Occasionally a boy was married in his teens where his father was wealthy or old and had no other sons who could inherit his property. Similarly, a girl was never married until she had been circumcised. Female initiation ceremonies took place every year from about a month after rains (iwot kot) March until (kipsunde) September so that there would be plenty of food for them. A bride would usually be in her mid- or late teens and would have been circumcised within the previous two to three years, having spent the intervening period in strict seclusion.

==== Arrangement of marriage ====
The first marriage of a man and a girl was arranged by their parents or guardians accordingly to the prospective bridegroom; a man with a marriageable daughter was obliged to wait until approached with an offer of marriage. On the other hand, a young man could ask his father to procure a wife for him he could name the particular girl of his choice. Polygamy was practiced by the tribe.

Bride price: The bride's father stated the bride price (kanyiok) which varied slightly in amount from clan to clan but not within a particular clan. It would be in the region of two herd of cattle (one heifer and one ox) and three sheep and or goats.

==== Ceremony ====
Traditionally, the wedding was officiated by an elder; the bride and groom would be blessed by four people carrying bouquets of the sinendet (traditionally auspicious plant) who would form a procession and go round the couple four times. Finally the bride and groom would bind a sprig of sekutiet (traditionally auspicious plant) onto each other's wrists. This was followed by feasting and dancing.

==== Female-female marriages ====
Female-female marriages within the Nandi culture have been reported, although it is unclear if they are still practiced, and only about three percent of Nandi marriages are female-female. Female-female marriages are a socially approved way for a woman to take over the social and economic roles of a husband and father. They were allowed only in cases where a woman either had no children of her own, had daughters only (one of them could be "retained" at home) or her daughter(s) had married off. The system was practiced "to keep the fire"—in other words, to sustain the family lineage, or patriline, and was a way to work around the problem of infertility or a lack of male heirs. A woman who married another woman for this purpose had to undergo an "inversion" ceremony to "change" into a man. This biological female, now socially a man, became a "husband" to a younger woman and a "father" to the younger woman's children, and had to provide a bride price to her wife's family. She was expected to renounce her female duties (such as housework), and take on the obligations of a husband; additionally, she was allowed the social privileges accorded to men, such as attending the private male circumcision ceremonies. No sexual relations were permitted between the female husband and her new wife (nor between the female husband and her old husband); rather, the female husband chose a male consort for the new wife so she will be able to bear children. The wife's children considered the female husband to be their father, not the biological father, because they were the socially designated father.

== Festivals and games ==
As elsewhere in Africa and the rest of the world, the Kalenjin celebrated various festivals and Kalenjin children had toys and played at different games.

=== Kipsundet ===
Kipsundet was a harvest festival observed during the months of September and October which was during the time of the ripening of the eleusine grain (finger millet) and after it had been harvested. Even in contemporary times, this period usually marks the start of the harvest of the long rains grain crop in the western Kenyan regions. This is the main harvest of the country.

During Kipsundet, which occurred in September and after which the month was named, each owner of a plantation would go with her daughters into the cornfields and make a bonfire of the branches and leaves of the lapotuet and pêk'ap tarit trees. Some eleusine was then plucked and one grain fixed in the necklace whilst another was rubbed on the forehead, throat and breast by each woman and girl. No joy was shown by the womenfolk on this occasion and they sorrowfully cut a basketful of the grain which they took home with them and placed in the loft to dry. A few days later, porridge made from the new grain was served with milk at the evening meal, and all the members of the family would take some of the food and dab it on the walls and roofs of the huts. The head of the household would then hold some eleusine grain in his hand and would offer up a prayer with everybody present repeating the words after him.

During the month of October, after the gathering of the harvest, the Kipsunde oeñg or Kipsude nepalet ceremony would be held. This festival was a community-wide celebration that was observed locally, i.e. each bororiet would hold its own feast on top of a hill or in a large open plain. The festival featured feasting with a particular feature being a roast that made use of four different types of wood as fuel; a large bonfire would first be made using emdit and tekat wood, on top of which kemeliet and lapotuet shrubs would be thrown. There was often also dancing of various styles such as kambakta, a warriors' dance, and sondoiyo, an old people's dance. The musical accompaniments usually included lyres, pipes and the sukutit drums.

After the ceremony, women would go down to the river and pick two stones from the river, one which they would keep in their water jar and one in their granaries until the next Kipsundet festival. The festival was described as 'obsolescent' in 1950.

=== Children's games ===
Small children were fond of building huts in the sand and would collect snails, pebbles and solanum berries to represent cows, sheep and goats. Small boys also played mock war games, arming themselves with wooden spears and shields and clubs made of bulrushes. Small girls made dolls out of the fruit of the sausage tree and dressed these up in skins and necklaces and bracelets made of seeds. Other games little children played included mororochet (frog) and kimnis, where ten to twenty children would sit in a circle and pass a piece of live charcoal behind them. One child stood outside the circle and tried to guess who had the charcoal.

=== Youth and adult pastimes ===
Youth and adults also had favorite pastimes. Big boys and girls sometimes had mock circumcision festivals but since children were not allowed to talk of circumcision, they called it branding. Other games included talus (shooting the bow, which was said to represent the bleeding of oxen), chemosiraitet (high jump) and kangetet (lifting the spear).

Kechuiek, the almost universal game of bao, was sometimes played by adults, though they did not make a board containing compartments as do many Bantu tribes but rather made holes in the earth in which they circulated seeds.

== Divisions of time ==
The Kalenjin year (kenyit) started in February. It had two seasons known as olto (pl. oltosiek) and was divided into twelve months, arawet (pl. arawek).

=== Seasons (oltosiek) ===
The first season of the year, olt-ap-iwot (iwotet), was the wet season and ran from March to August. The dry season, olt-ap-keme (kemeut), ran from September to February.

The kipsunde and kipsunde oieng harvest ceremonies were held in September and October, respectively, to mark the change in seasons.

=== Months (arawek) ===
	Name	Meaning	Corresponding month
1st month	Kiptamo	'Hot in the fields'	February
2nd month	Iwat-kut	'Rain in showers'	March
3rd month	Wake	-	April
4th month	Ngei	'Heart pushed on one side by hunger'	May
5th month	Rob-tui	'Black rain or black clouds'	June
6th month	Puret	'Mist'	July
7th month	Epeso	-	August
8th month	Kipsunde	'Offering to God in the cornfields'	September
9th month	Kipsunde oieng*	'Second offering to God'	October
10th month	Mulkul	'Strong wind'	November
11th month	Mulkulik oieng	'Second strong wind'	December
12th month	Ngotioto	'Month of pin-cushion plant'	January
