= Kerio Valley National Reserve =

Nature reserve in Kenya

- Location within Kenya
- Location: Rift Valley Province, Kenya
- Coordinates: 0.640112°N 35.608664°E
- Area: 66 square kilometres (25 sq mi)
- Established: 1983
- Governing body: Kenya Wildlife Service

The Kerio Valley National Reserve is a protected area in the Kerio Valley, Kenya, a branch of the Great Rift Valley. The 66 square kilometres (25 sq mi) reserve was created in 1983 and is managed by the Kenya Wildlife Service.

The isolated Kerio Valley lies between the Cherangani Hills and the Tugen Hills. The Elgeyo Escarpment rises more than 1,830 metres (6,000 ft) above the valley in places. The valley is 4,000 feet (1,200 m) deep. It has semi-tropical vegetation on the slopes, while the floor of the valley is covered by dry thorn bush. The most comfortable time of the year is in July and August when the rains have ended and the temperatures are not excessive.

The reserve is on the west side of the crocodile-infested Kerio River, while the Lake Kamnarok National Reserve is on the east side. The reserve has dramatic scenery, and prolific birdlife. As of 2006 there were no fees and no facilities, although it was possible to camp in the bush beside Lake Kamnarok. After the reserve was established there was an increase in the wildlife population, including elephants. These caused some damage to neighboring crops and beehives. Most of the people here are Kalenjin herders.

== Sources ==
- Hodd, Michael (2002). Footprint East Africa Handbook: The Travel Guide. Footprint Travel Guides. ISBN 1-900949-65-2.
- Fitzpatrick, Mary; Parkinson, Tom; Ray, Nick (2006). East África. Lonely Planet. p. 410. ISBN 1-74104-286-0.
- "Kerio Valley National Reserve". Kenya Wildlife Services. Archived from the original on 2011-11-28.
- Sumbeiywo (August 12, 1997). Parliamentary Debates. Kenya National Assembly.
