= Kamariny Stadium =

The Kamariny Stadium is a multi-purpose stadium 2 km outside the town of Iten, the capital of Elgeyo-Marakwet County, in Kenya. The stadium was opened by the Queen Elizabeth II of the United Kingdom in 1958. A plaque stands a few metres from the track that once bore her name. It was a public cinder track built to a British standard where four laps measures one imperial mile (5,280 feet or 1,760 yards).

The constructions around the pitch were demolished sometime in 2017–19, and a reconstruction to a capacity of 15,000 encompassing improvement to an eight-lane track and installation of field events facilities started in 2020, but then was terminated. It remains 30 percent completed.
