= Kimwarer =

Village in Elgeyo-Marakwet County, Kenya

Coordinates: 0°19′N 35°38′E

Kimwarer is a village in Elgeyo-Marakwet County, Kenya. It is located along the B54 Road between Eldoret and Tenges, in the southern part of Kerio Valley and in the drainage basin area of the Kerio River. One of the nearest villages is Kaptagat, located 10 kilometres west of Kimwarer on the Highlands. The nearest larger town, Eldoret, is 50 kilometres west of Kimwarer. Electorally Kimwarer is part of the Soy ward of Keiyo South Constituency and Keiyo County Council.

It is the largest village in the Kerio Valley area. The main industry in the area is fluorspar mining, conducted by the Kenya Fluorspar Company. Kimwarer is effectively a mining town as Kenya Fluorspar Company has built schools, medical facilities and housing.

Kimwarer has a small airstrip, In the small village of Chepsirei, east of Kimwarer.
