= Biretwo =

- Location within Kenya
- Coordinates: 0.55°N 35.55°E
- Country: Kenya
- Province: Rift Valley Province
- Time zone: UTC+3 (EAT)

Biretwo is a settlement in Kenya's Elgeyo Marakwet County.

== Ethnicity ==
The people of the Rift Valley are a mesh work of different tribal identities, and the Kalenjin and the Maasai are two well ethnic groups. Most of Kenya's top runners comes from the Kalenjin community. The Maasai people have the most recognizable cultural identity, both nationally and internationally, and serve as Kenya's international cultural symbol.

== See also ==
- Kerio River
- Zeitz Foundation
