= Mbagathi =

- Location within Kenya
- Coordinates: 1.38°S 36.77°E
- Country: Kenya
- Province: Rift Valley Province
- Time zone: UTC+3 (EAT)

'Mbagathi' is a settlement in Kenya's Rift Valley Province.

It is believed that the origin of the word Mbagathi is a mispronunciation by the Kikuyu of the word Empakassi, the Maasai name of the same area.
