= Charles Marsham =

Charles Marsham may refer to:

- Charles Marsham (cricketer) (1829–1901), English batsman for Oxford University and MCC
- Charles Marsham, 1st Earl of Romney (1744–1811), British peer and politician
- Charles Marsham, 2nd Earl of Romney (1777–1845), British peer and politician
- Charles Marsham, 3rd Earl of Romney (1808–1874), British peer and politician
- Charles Marsham, 4th Earl of Romney (1841–1905), British peer and politician

== See also ==
- Charles Field-Marsham (born 1968), Canadian businessman
