= Ministry of Mining (Kenya) =

Government ministry of Kenya

- Wizara ya Madini
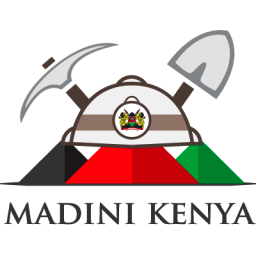
- Logo of the Ministry of Mining

Agency overview
- Formed: March 4, 2013; 13 years ago
- Preceding agency: Ministry of Environment and Natural Resources
- Headquarters: Kenya Works Building, Ngong Road; P.O. Box 30009, 00100; Nairobi, Kenya
- Annual budget: KSh. 2 billion
- Agency executives: Najib Balala, Cabinet Secretary for Mining; Patrick Omutia, Principal Secretary
- Website: mining.go.ke

The Ministry of Mining of the Republic of Kenya is a Kenyan government ministry that oversees the Mineral sector in the country.

Kenya has a variety of mineral deposits and exploration projects even though mining in the country is largely small-scale. Some of the minerals found in Kenya include; soda ash, limestone, fluorspar, gemstones and even gold.

The Ministry of mining was established as an independent ministry after the 2013 general elections. The government recognized that the mining industry in Kenya has the potential to spur the country's economic growth. Prior to the ministry's establishment all mining related activities in Kenya were overseen by the Ministry of Environment and Natural Resources.

Najib Balala, a jubilee government principal, was then appointed as the first Cabinet Secretary to head the newly formed ministry.

In 2016, the Mining Act was enacted, introducing what was considered by industry stakeholders a modern legislation to spur the sectors growth. Even with the new legislation, Kenya's Mining sector remains largely under explored with players citing various challenges including lack of adequate government support.

In 2019, for instance, the government issued a moratorium restricting the processing and issuance of licenses and renewal applications saying it was aimed at streamlining the sector and map out minerals and take an audit of existing permits and licences.

President William Ruto has cited that his government is committed to support the development of the country's mining sector and create a conducive environment for investors. In April 2024, the government lifted the four-year freeze on issuing mining licences.

In February 2024, the government signed a multi-billion shilling deal with a UK-based firm to revive fluorspar exploration at Kerio Valley following the closure of the Kenya Fluorspar over a decade ago.

== History ==
The ministry has been pursuing changes in the mining sector. In 2013, the ministry revoked 31 mining licenses for minerals ranging from base and precious metals, industrial minerals, non-precious minerals and gemstones. As of 2015 the number rose to 65. The ministry claimed that the contracts were issued under unclear circumstances.

In the time between January and May 2013, out of all 500 mining licenses issued, only 20 were found credible. Revocation of the 65 licenses by the Ministry of Mining in 2015 opened up 4.5 million acres of land to new explorers.

== See also ==
- Geography of Kenya
- Ministries of Kenya
