= Lorugumu =

- Location within Kenya
- Coordinates: 2.88°N 35.25°E
- Country: Kenya
- Province: Rift Valley Province
- Time zone: UTC+3 (EAT)

Lorugumu is a settlement in Turkana, located in Kenya's Rift Valley Province. This area has the Medical Missionaries of Mary medical dispensary, small hospital and school.
