= Lengesim =

- Location within Kenya
- Coordinates: 2.4°S 37.22°E
- Country: Kenya
- Province: Rift Valley Province
- Time zone: UTC+3 (EAT)

Lengesim is a town in Kajiado County, Kenya. It is spread over a large slice of savannah, dominated by the profile of Kilimanjaro, about 200 kilometers (four hours by car) from Nairobi. Lengesim (Lenkism) has a rural population of about 10,000. Local people are predominantly of the Maasai tribe. The area experiences droughts occasionally but its proximity to Amboseli National park and livestock farming has created an economy.
