= Kabarak =

The Kabarak are a clan found in Keiyo South district, Elgeyo-Marakwet County in The Great Rift Valley, Kenya. The district covers most parts of the Kitany sub-location, Epke and Mosop. It inhabits from the Kaptagat forest eastwards to the Keiyo-Baringo border at Endo. The clan animal is Teriki, a brown elephant. Kapmaeny araa, Kapchemobor, Kapkapkee, kamogit, Kosormey, Kabirirkuut and kapnyongi are the main families of the clan.

The clan has grown to approximately 3,000 households with an estimated population of about 15,000.

== Villages ==
Kabarak villages include Mutwo, Kapserton, Orapno, Lelin, Epke, Mosop and Chemurgui.

The villages are headed by the village elders who are tasked with solving minor disputes amongst the residents.

The landmarks along the Kabarak clan's land include the Kapserton Cattle dip. Built in 1966, the cattle dip has been serving the whole Kitany location for decades. It has also proved to be the only cattle dip which has survived the time challenge, many more have collapsed except this one.

The Koipa-cheligui viewpoint is at the edge of the escarpment. The height of the cliff is estimated to be between 80 and 100 meters. The cliff faces the eastern direction making it a common spot for viewing the sun as it rises.
