= Rimoi National Reserve =

Protected area in Kenya

The Rimoi National Reserve is an animal conservation reserve located in Elgeyo Marakwet County, Kenya. It is a relatively small reserve, covering 66 km^{2}, and is protected by the Kenya Wildlife Service. It lies adjacent to Lake Kamnarok which has recently dried up and is part of a conservation area that is five larger than its size.

== Wildlife ==
Traditionally the only large mammals in Rimoi and Kamnarok were elephants, which wander in and out and up and down the valley at will, in accordance with the availability of water and food. The elephants feed mainly at night. Smaller mammals include dikdik, impala, bush pig, warthog, monkeys, civet, genet, and pangolin. Reptiles include; crocodiles, Agama and other lizards, tortoise and many snakes. The reserve is currently being fenced (with a corridor being left for the elephants). The Elgeyo Marakwet and Baringo Governors released thirty zebras into the reserve in 2016 as part of a plan by the Elgeyo Marakwet County Government to restock the reserve.

== Restoration ==
The reserve had been neglected for many years, until April 2015 when the Elgeyo Marakwet County Government and the Kenya Wildlife Service collaborated in rehabilitating the reserve.
