= Marakwet people =

Kenyan ethnic group

Marakwet is also a district in Kenya, see Marakwet District

The Marakwet are one of the groups forming the ethnolinguistic Kalenjin community of Kenya, they speak the Markweta language. The Marakwet live in five territorial sections namely Almoo, Cherangany (Sengwer or Kimaala), Endoow, Sombirir (Borokot) and Markweta (the dialect giving rise to the common name). Cutting across these territorial groups are a number of clans to which each Marakwet belongs. There were 119,969 Marakwet people in 2019.

Most Marakwet today live in the Elgeyo-Marakwet County, a notably beautiful and picturesque part of Kenya. It is bounded to the east by the Kerio River at 1000 m above sea level, which runs through a small branch of the Great Rift Valley. To the west it includes almost the entire Cherang’any hills which rise to 3300 m above sea level west of the Marakwet escarpment. Significant populations of individuals of Marakwet heritage are also resident in the Trans Nzoia, and Uasin Gishu counties, as well as in other towns in Kenya. Others have moved to live in places as far away as Australia, Southern Africa, the Middle East, and United States.

A large majority of Marakwet lead a simple rural life characterized by mixed small scale farming. They grow mostly maize, potatoes, beans and vegetables in the highlands. Those who live along the escarpment and the Kerio Valley mainly keep goats and zebu cows. They also grow millet, sorghum, cassava, vegetables and fruits, mostly mangoes and oranges. There is a sophisticated pre-historic irrigation furrow system that supports this crop cultivation along the Kerio Valley that is thought to be over 500 years old.

Some of the greatest long distance and especially steeplechase runners in the world have come from amongst these people. A notable example is Moses Kiptanui, the first man to run a sub-eight in steeplechase.

== History ==
The traditional Marakwet religion consisted of multiple deities with hierarchical ranking. The most important deity was Assis (the sun), sometimes fondly referred to as Chebetip chemataw. He is mostly associated with blessings and good will. Another deity is Ilat (god of thunder). He is associated with rain and in dry seasons sacrifices were made to appease him. He is also associated with fury and vengeance whereby he causes droughts or strikes people with lightning if he is angered.

=== 19th century ===
It is not immediately clear when a distinct Marakwet identity took form. Through to the early 20th century, the various Marakwet territorial groups were referred to by their individual names. Beech (1911) for instance did a study of the Endo, who he noted among the neighbors of the Suk.

== Culture ==
Traditional Marakwet society shared a number of similarities but also distinct peculiarities, with and from other Kalenjin communities.

=== Social groups ===
The Marakwet people consist of five distinct territorial groups that, "forged some form of association through their common residence along the Kerio Valley and the Cherangani Hills". From north to south along the valley are, the Endoow, Markweta and Almoo, in the hills are, the Borokot and Cherang'any (Sengwer or Kimaala).

Cutting across the territorial groups are thirteen patrilineal clans, each of which (with the exception of Sogom) is divided into two or more exogamic sections distinguished by totems. Many of these clans are also represented in other Kalenjin groups.

Each person recognizes, as the primary part of his/her personal name, the name of their clan. For instance a man of the Kobil clan, asked, "Who are you?", would reply "I am Kobilyo", a woman of the same clan, "I am Kobilyo". Next they would be asked, "Of which totem?" and only after this primary identification can more personal names be given.

Clan	Masculine Sing.	Feminine Sing.	Totems
Kabon	Kabonin	Kabonin	Baboon - Frog - Rat - Taiywa (a species of wild fowl)
Moi	Kimoin or Moiyo	Kimoi	Buffalo - Crested crane - Osit (a bird) - Kosomyo (ground bees)
Kobil	Kobilyo	Kobilo	Porcuine - Dog - Kipkuto - Black-necked crow
Mokich	Mokichin	Mokicho	Moon - Fire
Saniak	Saniakin	Saniaka	Monkey - Bees (Red or Brown)
Sogom	Sogomin	Sogomo	Hawk
Sot	Sotio	Soti	Sun - Mokyo (a worm)
Syokwei	Syokweiyo	Syokwei	Black stinging ant - ?
Talai	Talain	Talaa	Cheringis (a lizard) - White necked crow
Terik	Terikin	Teriki	Kabongen (large elephant) - Kapkatien (small elephant)
Toyoi	Toyoin	Toyoi	Ilat (lightning) - Water
Tingo	Tingoyo	Tingo	Hyena - Kimaget
Tul	Tulin	Tula	Kipsero (large jackal), Chepkinjo (small jackal)

=== Folklore ===
Like other oral societies, the Marakwet developed a rich collection of folklore. Folk narratives were told to pass on a message and also as a means of keeping historical record. A common Marakwet folk tale is the Legend of fall of Kipteber, the rock-mountain.

== Relations with the Pokot people ==
The Marakwet and Pokot tribes are both sub-groups of the larger Kalenjin. War started as a result of livestock theft, and the tribes have since gone through periods of war and peace. War raged between some of the Marakwet clans, e.g. Kapkau and Karel from the valley, because of a land dispute and this has resulted in a loss of lives (11 people were killed in Kapkau). There was a demonstration by people of the Sambirir region over alleged killing of people and they requested the government to carry out an operation in the lower part to remove all guns, but this has not been done. The district court promised to act in order to make Marakwet a peaceful place. Note: The Killings done by the Karel people were attributed to high arrogance and fraud to illegally take Kapkau's land.Based on irrefutable evidence and thorough examination, it has been conclusively established that the land rightfully belongs to Kapkau.Through historical records, it has been proven beyond any doubt that Kapkau has lawful ownership of the disputed territory. This assertion is grounded in verifiable facts that affirm Kapkau's legitimate claim to the land. Any further dispute regarding ownership would be baseless and contrary to the established truth supported by concrete evidence.

There have been immense achievements in terms of peace promotion among the Marakwets and the Pokots. War between them ended in the year 2000, marked by the killing of 47 people in Murkutwa Marakwet, 26 km east of Chesoi. The Marakwets and the Pokots coexist now and conduct trade, for example in the Kipchinda, Chesongoch, Kolowo and Tot markets. Marakwets also take cereals [maize, millet and sorghum] to the Pokots in the Kolowo and Kimnai markets in exchange for cash.

== Notable people ==
- Edward Cheserek, a Kenyan-American runner
- Edwin Kemboi Sutter, a pioneer ICT specialist, accomplished public servant and the current Chief Officer for ICT & e-Government at the County Government of Uasin Gishu
- Dr. Albert Kimutai, a microbiologist, entrepreneur in [Eldoret], politician, educationist currently a senior lecturer of Microbiology at Kabianga University,
- Moses Kiptanui, a runner and the first man to run a sub-eight time in the 3000m steeplechase race.
- Kipchumba Murkomen, Senator Elgeyo Marakwet County
- Ezekiel Kemboi, Kenya 3000m Men Steeplechase Athlete
- Architect Joseph Maswan
- Alex Tolgos, the first Governor of Elgeyo Marakwet.
- Waziri Linah Kilimo, the first Marakwet to be a cabinet Minister and also the first woman to be elected a legislator.
- Engineer Sammy Tangus
- Engineer Kilimo
- Kiptala Chemweno, the first Marakwet to earn a university degree in the UK.
- Donald B. Kipkorir, advocate of the high court of Kenya.
- The Late Athlete Richard Chelimo, the 10000 metres Olympic silver medalist in Barcelona '92.
- Oscar Sudi, the current serving MNA for Kapseret Constituency in Uasin Gishu County.
- The retired police inspector general Kimaiyo.
- Entrepreneur Chepkuto from Sambirir who bought the first ten-wheeled lorry without a loan or fundraising.
- Former MP Frederick Kisang Chabat who could advocate for the rights of Marakwets by both peace and force.
