= Kerio Valley =

Valley in Kenya

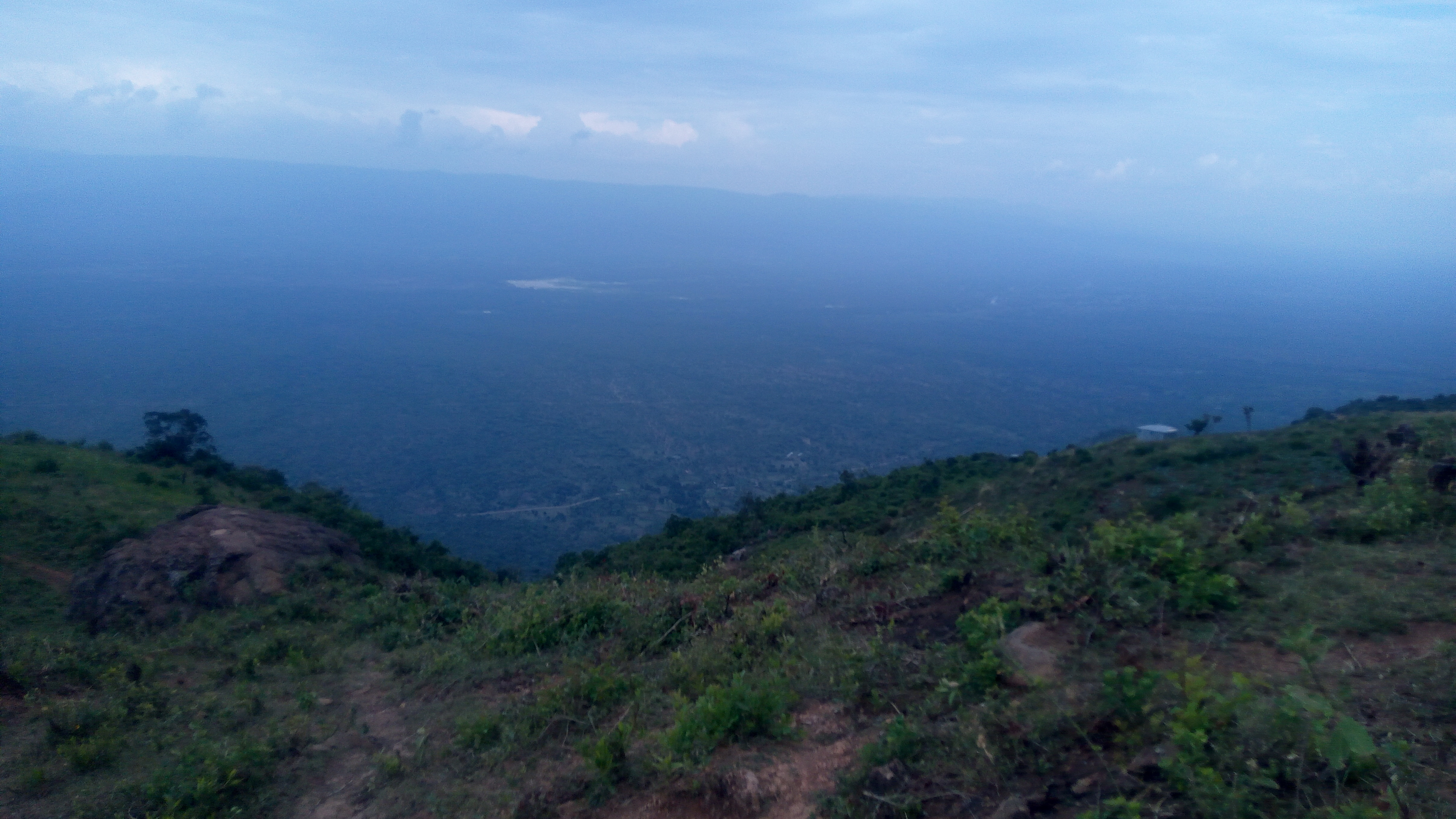
- Kerio Valley when viewed from Anin escarpment, just below Iten. Lake Kapnarok and Tugen Hills in the middle and background respectively.

- Location within Kenya
- Floor elevation: 1,000 m (3,300 ft)
- Length: 80 kilometres (50 mi) North - South
- Width: 10 kilometres (6.2 mi)

Geology
- Type: Rift valley
- Age: Miocene, 22–25 million years ago

Geography
- Population centers: Kimwarer, Chepsigot, Tot
- Coordinates: 0°38′24″N 35°36′31″E
- Interactive map of Kerio Valley

Kerio Valley lies between the Tugen Hills and the Elgeyo Escarpment in Kenya. It sits at an elevation of 1,000 metres (3,300 ft) in the Great Rift Valley.

== Geography ==
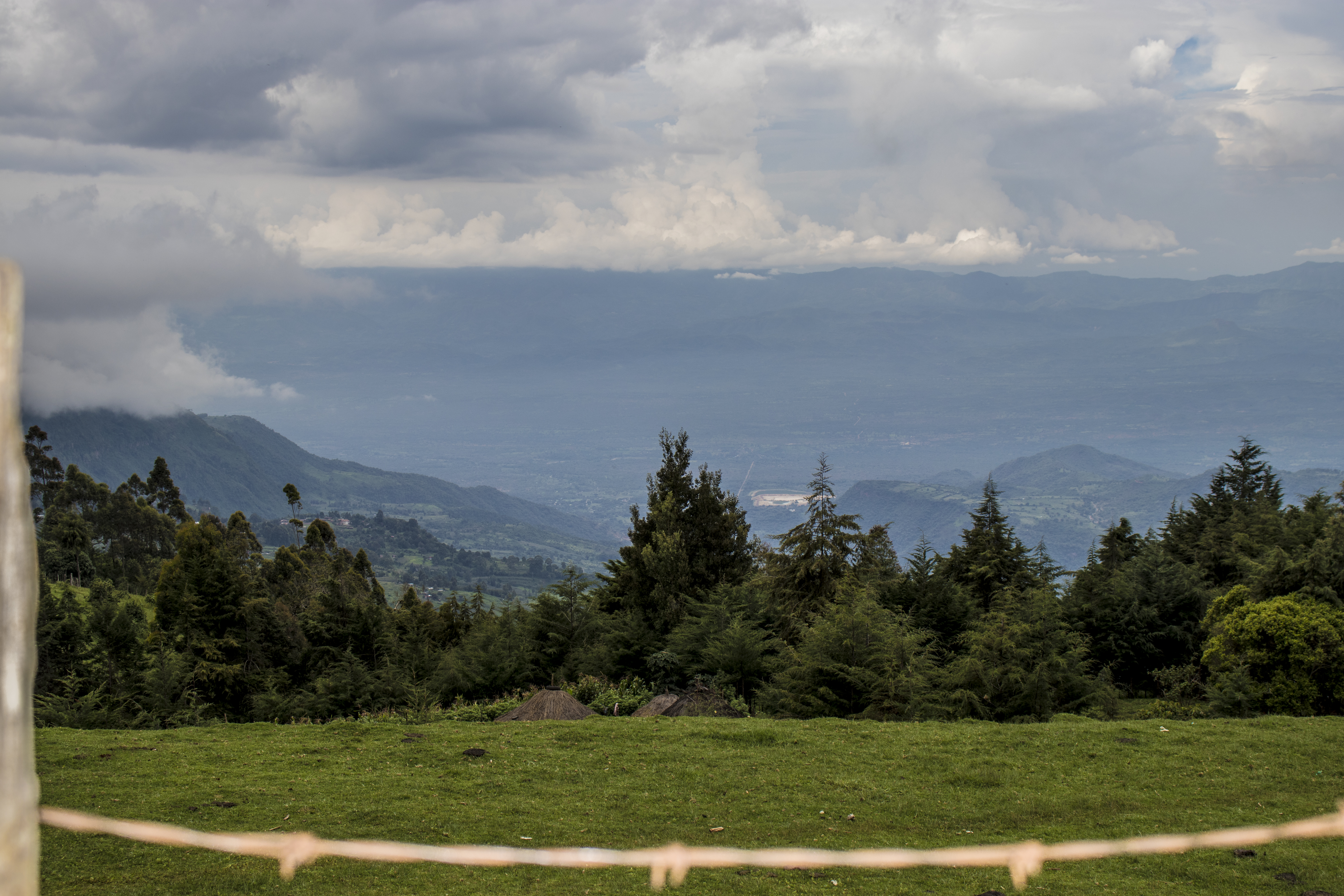
View of Kerio Valley

The isolated Kerio Valley is situated in a narrow, long strip that is approximately 80 km by 10 km wide at its broadest, through which the Kerio River flows. 1,200 metres (4,000 ft) deep, the valley lies between the Cherangani Hills and the Tugen Hills.

The Elgeyo Escarpment rises more than 1,830 metres (6,000 ft) above it in places. It has semi-tropical vegetation on the slopes, while the floor of the valley is covered by dry thorn bushes. The most comfortable time of the year is in July and August when the rains have ended and the temperatures are not excessive.

The Kerio Valley National Reserve has been established since 1983 along the Kerio River to the north of Lake Kamnarok.

== Archaeological Activities ==
The Kerio Valley is the site of elaborate irrigation systems that were constructed during earlier periods of history. These structures are believed to have been built by descendants of the Neolithic Afro-Asiatic people who introduced domesticated plants and animals to the Great Lakes region—a succession of societies collectively known as the Stone Bowl cultural complex. Most of these early northern migrants are said to have been absorbed by later movements of Nilotic and Bantu people. Although the particular irrigation systems in the Kerio Valley are today maintained by the Marakwet subgroup of the Kalenjin Nilotes, the latter assert that they were the work of a northern people of a peculiar language called the Sirikwa, who were later decimated by pestilence. According to the Marakwet, the Sirikwa "built the furrows, but they did not teach us how to build them; we only know how to keep them as they are." The missing link however re-occurs in Tanzania out of an ethnic community known as Iraqw. The Iraqw openly admit to be the masterminds behind the constructions and links to the Engaruka complex in Tanzania. Sengwer ethnicity of Kalenjin, Talai clan of the Kipsigiis and Nandi are believed to be facets of the Iraqw who took a Kalenjin identity.

== People ==
In Kimwarer in the southern part of the valley, fluoride is mined by the Kenya Fluorspar Company. The southern parts of the valley are settled by the Elgeyo people and the northern part by the Marakwet people. Tugen people live on the slopes of the Tugen Hills. These three groups together with the Nandi and the Kipsigis belong to the Kalenjin people.
