= Lake Kamnarok =

Lake Kamnarok and Lake Kanyaboli in Alego, Siaya County.
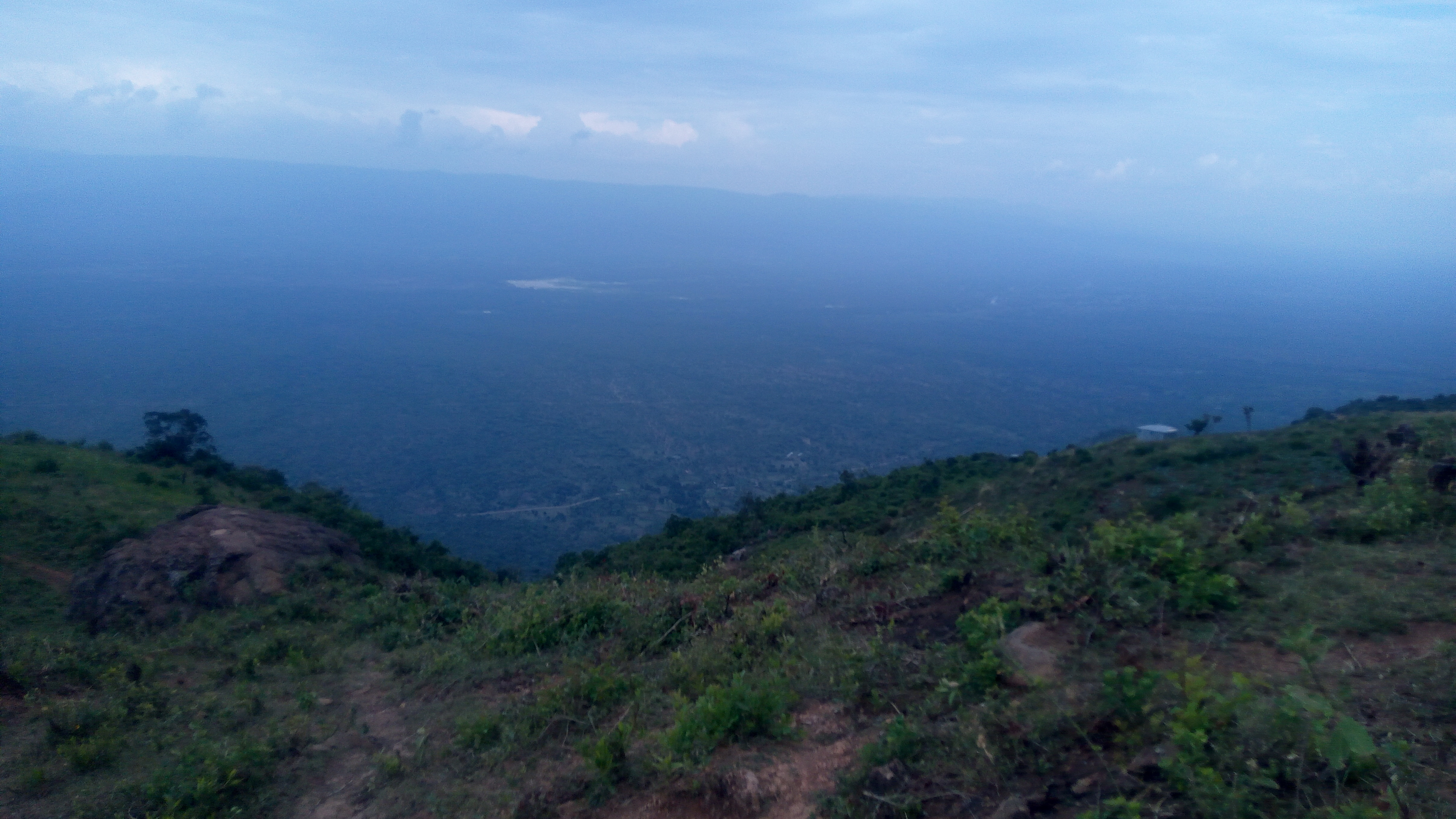
- Lake Kamnarok in the middle of Kerio Valley when viewed from Anin Escarpment, Above Songeto

- Location within Kenya Location within Africa
- Location: Kerio Valley
- Coordinates: 0°38′N 35°37′E
- Type: oxbow lake
- Primary inflows: Kerio River
- Primary outflows: Kerio River
- Basin countries: Kenya
- Surface area: 1 km^{2} (0.39 sq mi)

Lake Kamnarok is a seasonal lake and one of the few ox-bow lakes in Kenya, found at the base of the Kerio Valley. The name originated from the Kalenjin word Narok, which is used to refer to a species of water plant that was widely found in the lake. Thick mash surrounds the lake, making accessibility challenging.

The lake occupies an area of approximately 1 km^{2} however being a seasonal lake, the size may at times be much smaller. It was in existence before 1961 but the flood rains of that year led to its enlargement. The flooding disaster saw people living in the area being evacuated in order to save lives. Helicopters were used during the evacuation exercise to airlift people to the higher ground of Maab Konga - a hill near Muchukwo trading centre.

== Ecological value ==
The lake was gazetted in 1983, when Lake Kamnarok Game Reserve was created and was once touted as the second largest ecosystem in Africa with the highest number of animals after Lake Chad. According to report by the Nation Media Group, the lake provided a refuge to over 10,000 white crocodiles, 400 elephants, 13 species of other mammals and a wide variety of bird species by the year 2020, making it one of the richest game reserve in terms of biodiversity in the country and in Africa. This attracted thousands of tourists who flocked the lake to view African most beautiful wildlife, earning the county major revenue.

== Threats and conservation ==
Like other Great Rift Valley lakes, the existence of Lake Kamnarok is threatened, mainly because of farming activities in the area, overgrazing and climate changes. The tributaries that feed Lake Kamnarok include the rivers Ketipborok, Cheplogoi, Oiwo and Lelabei.

Despite numerous efforts by the locals and the government to save the lake, the wildlife of Lake Kamnarok is still facing extinction threats following uncontrolled human encroachments and ever changing climatic conditions. Speaking to the Nation Media Group, the authority of Lake Kamnarok Game Reserve confirmed that at least 200 white crocodiles have died of hunger and thirst between January and March, 2023, while the survivors are forced to move upstream in search of a better habitat. The report stated that some white crocodiles are still stuck in the mud are most likely to perish if no action is taken. Locals are also appealing to the relevant state agencies such as Kenya WildLife Service to take serious actions that can save the lives of the remaining wildlife.
