= Elgeyo-Marakwet County =

Coordinates: 0°48′N 35°34′E

Elgeyo Marakwet
- County
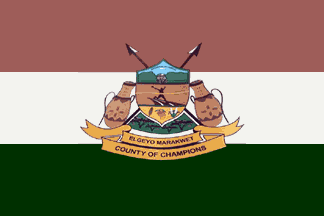
- Flag

- Location in Kenya
- Country: Kenya
- Founded: 4 March 2013
- Capital: Iten

Government
  - Governor: Wisley Rotich

Area
  - Total: 3,049.7 km^{2} (1,177.5 sq mi)

Population (2019)
  - Total: 454,480
  - Density: 149.02/km^{2} (385.97/sq mi)
- Time zone: UTC+3 (EAT)

Elgeyo-Marakwet County is one of Kenya's 47 counties. Located in the former Rift Valley Province, the capital and largest town is Iten. It borders the counties of West Pokot to the north, Baringo County to the east, southeast and south, Uasin Gishu to the southwest and west, and Trans Nzoia to the northwest.

== Demographics ==
The total population of Elgeyo-Marakwet County is 454,480 persons, 227,317 are females, 227,151 males, and 12 intersex persons. There are 99,861 households in the county with an average size of 4.5 persons per household with a population density of 150 persons per square km.

=== Religion ===
Religion in Elgeyo-Marakwe County

Religion (2019 Census)	Number
Catholicism	231,873
Protestant	144,885
Evangelical Churches	46,334
African instituted Churches	12,461
Orthodox	256
Other Christian	7,394
Islam	1,142
Hindu	14
Traditionists	491
Other	2,933
Atheists	5,210
Don't Know	395
Not Stated	46

== Geography, geology and topography ==
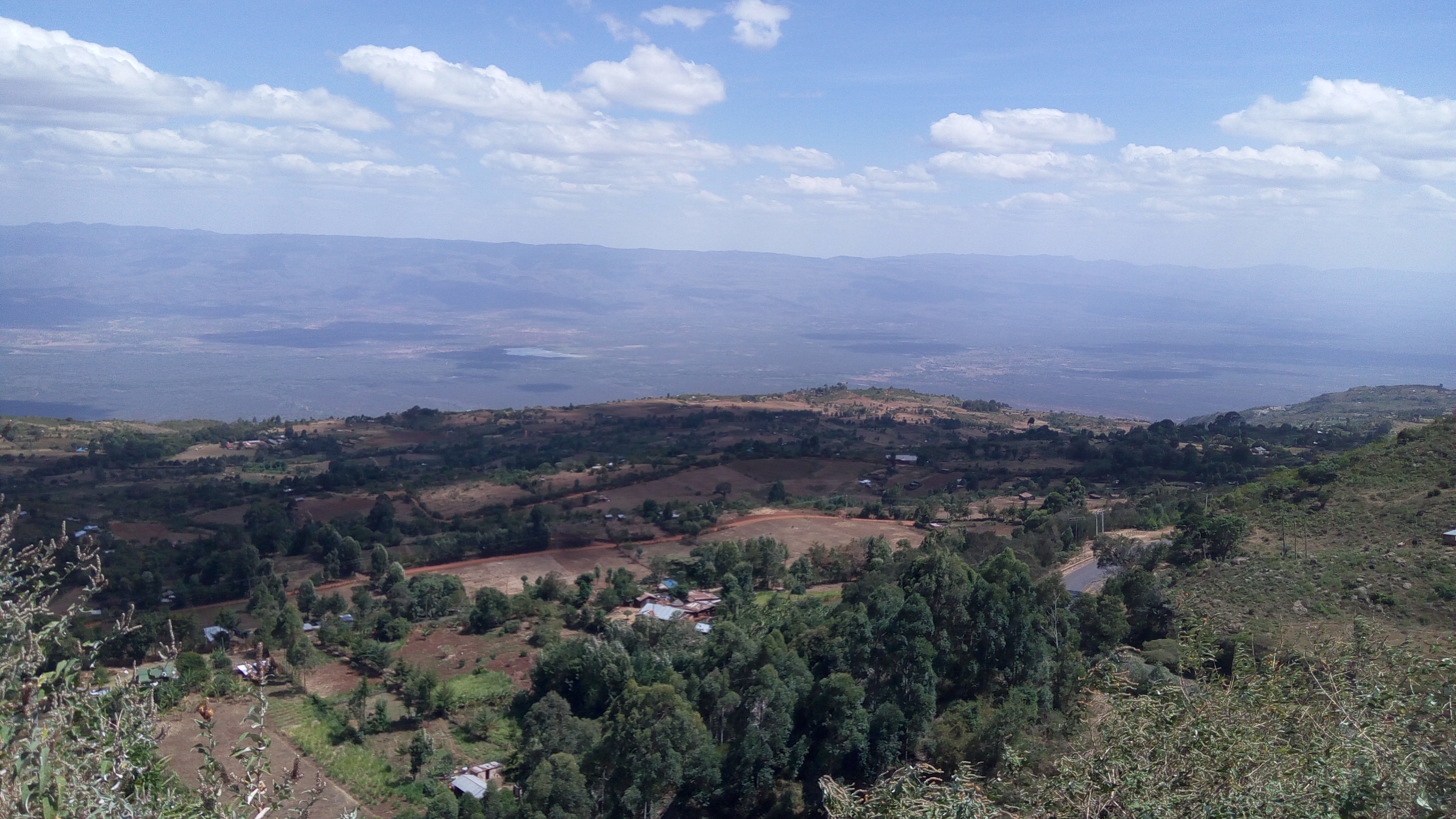
Escarpment panorama viewed from Iten View Point

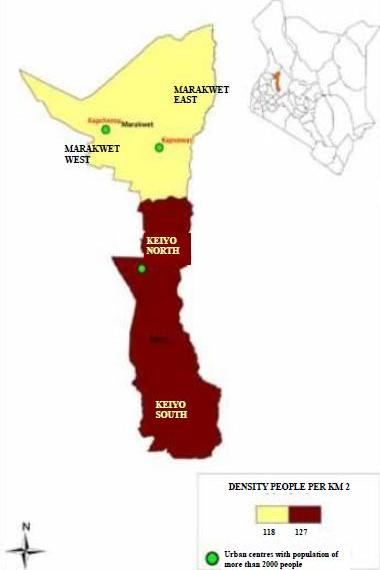
Population density in Elgeyo markwet county

The Kerio River binds the county on the eastern side. From its alluvial plain, the topography gradually rises towards the west. The Elgeyo Escarpment stands out distinctly with elevation differences of up to 1,500 metres. In the northern and southern parts of the county the topography is rugged, giving way to more subdued relief differences going westwards. The underlying geology consists of gneisses from the Basement System. The Cherangany Hills rise gently to form the western half of the Great Rift Valley and extend northwest in a broken chain to Mount Moroto in Uganda. Non-volcanic in origin, the Cherangany Hills resulted from subsequent erosion of the raised western ridge of the Eastern Rift Valley. The range is approximately 50 kilometres (30 mi) long and 40 kilometres (25 mi) wide and averages 2,700 metres (9,000 ft) in height; the highest point is more than 3,400 metres (11,000 ft). Many of the summits are covered with huge groundsels and lobelias. Some of the hills include Kamologon (3581 m), Chebon (3375 m), Chepkotit (3370 m), Karelachgelat (3350 m) and Sondany (3211 m).

== Climate ==
Temperatures range from a minimum of 12 °C—relatively cool, with mists and occasionally even frost—to a maximum of 22 °C. Rainfall ranges annually from 800 to 2300 mm.

== Religion and ethnicity ==
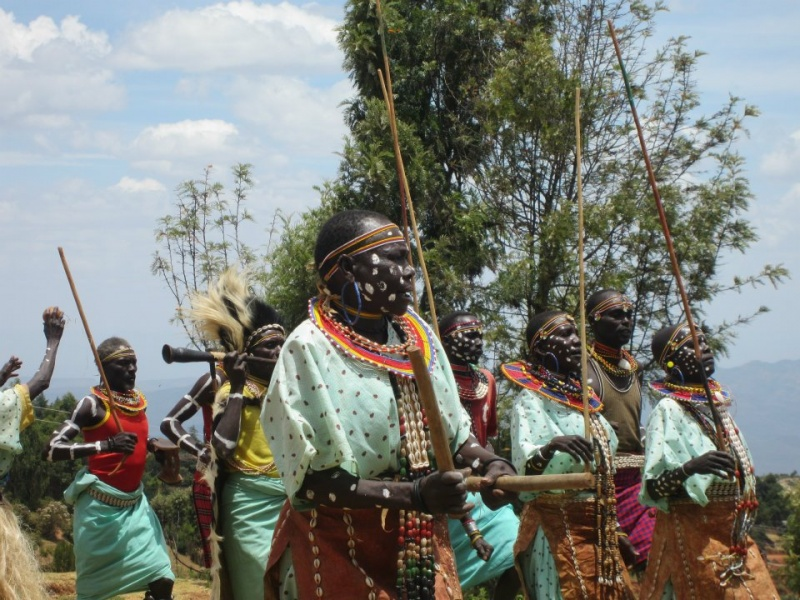
Marakwet Traditional Dancers

The county is mainly occupied by Keiyo, Sengwer (also called Cherangany) and Marakwet are part of the larger ethnic grouping of eight culturally and linguistically related ethnic groups known as the Kalenjin.
Marakwet is a sub-tribe of the Kalenjin. It is made up of the sub-dialects Almoo, Endoow, Markweta (the sub-dialect giving rise to the common name), and Sombirir (Borokot) who presently predominantly live in Marakwet District in the North Rift Valley Province. Some now live in Trans Nzoia East and Uasin Gishu North districts and in other towns.
The name Keiyo or Elgeyo has been used interchangeably to describe the Keiyo people. The latter name is disputed as a corruption of the true name, which was coined by the Uasin-Gishu Maasai, who were the Keiyo's neighbours in the mid-9th century at the western side of Eldoret.

== Administrative and Political Units ==
Elgeyo - Marakwet is divided into 4 sub-counties, 20 county assemblies wards, 68 locations and 199 sub-locations. Below is the distribution of the county assemblies wards.

Political Units
Constituency	No. of Wards
Marakwet East	4
Marakwet West	6
Keiyo North	4
Keiyo South	6
TOTAL	20

== County government ==
Wisley Rotich who succeeded Alex Tolgos is currently serving his first term as the county's Governor. William Kisang is the current senator replacing Kipchumba Murkomen who was appointed as Cabinet Secretary for Roads. The County Women Representative is Caroline Jeptoo Ng'elechei, all of the United Democratic Alliance (UDA) Party, an affiliate of the Kenya Kwanza Alliance. The county has four constituencies in the National Assembly, and twenty ward seats in its County Assembly. The County Assembly Speaker is Mr. Lawi Kibire.

First Elgeyo Marakwet senator Onesmus Kipchumba Murkomen

First Elgeyo Marakwet Women Representative Susan Kipketer Chebet

=== County Executive Committee ===
Person	Docket
Alphaeus Tanui	Finance and Economic Planning
Thomas Maiyo	Lands, Physical Planning, Housing and Urban Development
Edwin Kibor	Education and Technical Training
Robert Kangogo	Co-operatives, Trade, Industrialization, Tourism and Widlife
Emmy Kosgei	Roads, Public Works and Transport
Michael Kibiwott	Health Services
Jason Lagat	Water, Environment and Climate Change
Purity Koima	Sports, Youth Affairs, Culture, Children and Social Services
Monica Rotich	Public Service, Devolution, Administration, Communications, ICT and E-Governance
Edwin Seroney	Agriculture, Livestock, Fisheries and Irrigation

=== County Ward Representatives ===
Constituency	Ward	Representative
Marakwet East	Kapyego	Hon. Chebet Joseph Kipkorir
Marakwet East	Sambirir	Hon. Suter Paul Kipkemoi
Marakwet East	Endo	Hon. Kibiwott Jeremiah Kiptum
Marakwet East	Embobut/Embulot	Hon. Kipyatich Paul Kipchumba
Marakwet West	Lelan	Hon. Kurgat Pricillah Jepkoech
Marakwet West	Sengwer	Hon. Kiptoo Asbel Kisang
Marakwet West	Cherang'any/Chebororwa	Hon. Kosgei Evans Kimutai
Marakwet West	Moiben/Kuserwo	Hon. Kiplagat Hillary Kipchirchir
Marakwet West	Kapsowar	Hon. Kipruto Joshua
Marakwet West	Arror	Hon. Mutwol Justine kosgei
Keiyo North	Kamariny	Hon. Cheptiony Benjamin Kipkemboi
Keiyo North	Emsoo	Hon. Cheboiboch Christopher Kangogo
Keiyo North	Tambach	Hon. Chesire Dominic
Keiyo North	Kapchemutwa	Hon. Cheruiyot Stephen Kemboi
Keiyo South	Kaptarakwa	Hon. Kimutai Mathew Cheruiyot
Keiyo South	Chepkorio	Hon. Koima John Kimeli
Keiyo South	Soy North	Hon. Chepseba Simeon Kibet
Keiyo South	Soy South	Hon. Tanui Jonah Kipkorir
Keiyo South	Kabiemit	Hon. Barsulai Alfred Kipkoech
Keiyo South	Metkei	Hon. Kibire Lawi Kipng’etich
Nominated	Kaptarakwa	Hon. Kimutai Mathew Cheruiyot
Nominated	Gender	Hon. Kiptoo Evalyne Jepchumba
Nominated	Gender	Hon. Kiptoo Peris Jelagat
Nominated	Gender	Hon. Kimitto Salina Jemosop
Nominated	Gender	Hon. Rotich Jebet Eddah
Nominated	Gender	Hon. Karen Jelagat Koech
Nominated	Gender	Hon. Kimoning Tabitha Jepkirui
Nominated	Gender	Hon. Kosgei Sally Jebet
Nominated	Youth	Hon. Nge'tich Gilbert Kipkosgei
Nominated	Youth	Hon. Bowen Stella
Nominated	Gender	Hon. Cherop Rosa
Nominated	PWD	Hon. Lai victoria Jemutai
Nominated	PWD	Hon. Biwott Davies Kimutai

== Health ==
The county has over 130 public and private health facilities with an average of 3.7 km access distance from one health centre to another. The county has 626 medical personnels across the fields of medical profession.

== Transport and Communication ==
The region is covered with 292.1 km of earth, 1,415.3 km of murram and 92.2 km of bitumen. As at 2014 there were 8 postal offices across the county with 1,600 installed letter boxes, 1,112 rented letter boxes and 488 vacant letter boxes.

== Economy ==
The main economic activity carried out in the county is mixed farming, which consists mainly of livestock and subsistence farming. Other activities include small business, tourism and fluorspar mining in Kerio Valley. Oil Prospecting by Tullow Oil Company is ongoing in Kerio Valley.

As at 2014 county had 62,190,000 cattle, 7,220,000 goats and 10,232,000 sheep.

=== Tourism ===
Major Tourist Attractions are

- Kerio Valley National Reserve
- Elgeyo Escarpment
- Sports Tourism
- Paragliding
- Cherang'any Hills
- River Kerio
- Rimoi National Reserve
- Torok waterfalls
- Chebara Dam
- Sergoit Hill
- Lake Kapnarok
- Kiplachoch caves
- Mount Kipkunur
- Cheploch Gorge
- Kipteber Meteorite Historical Mountain
- Kureswo Hotsprings
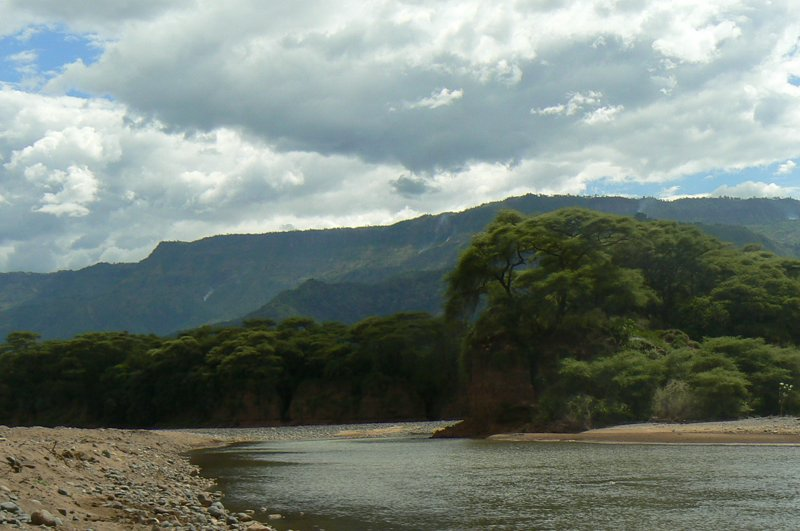
Kerio river

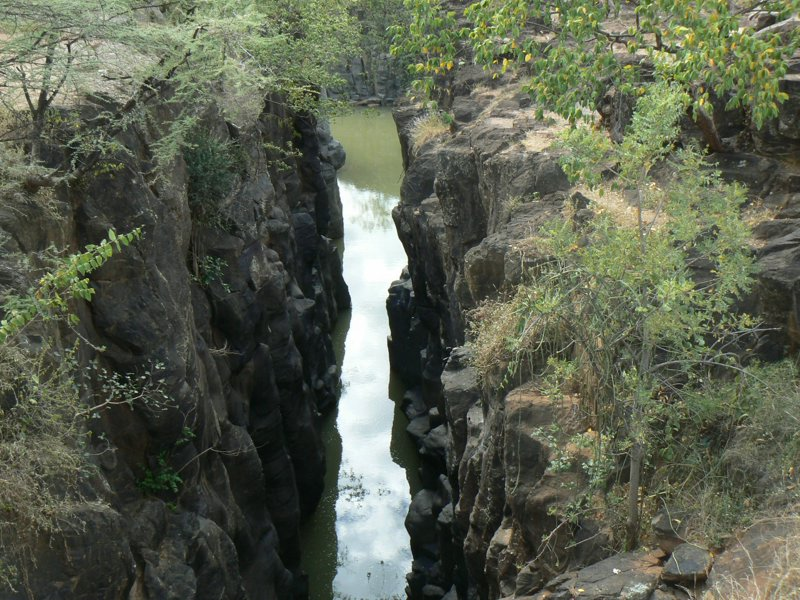
Cheploch gorge

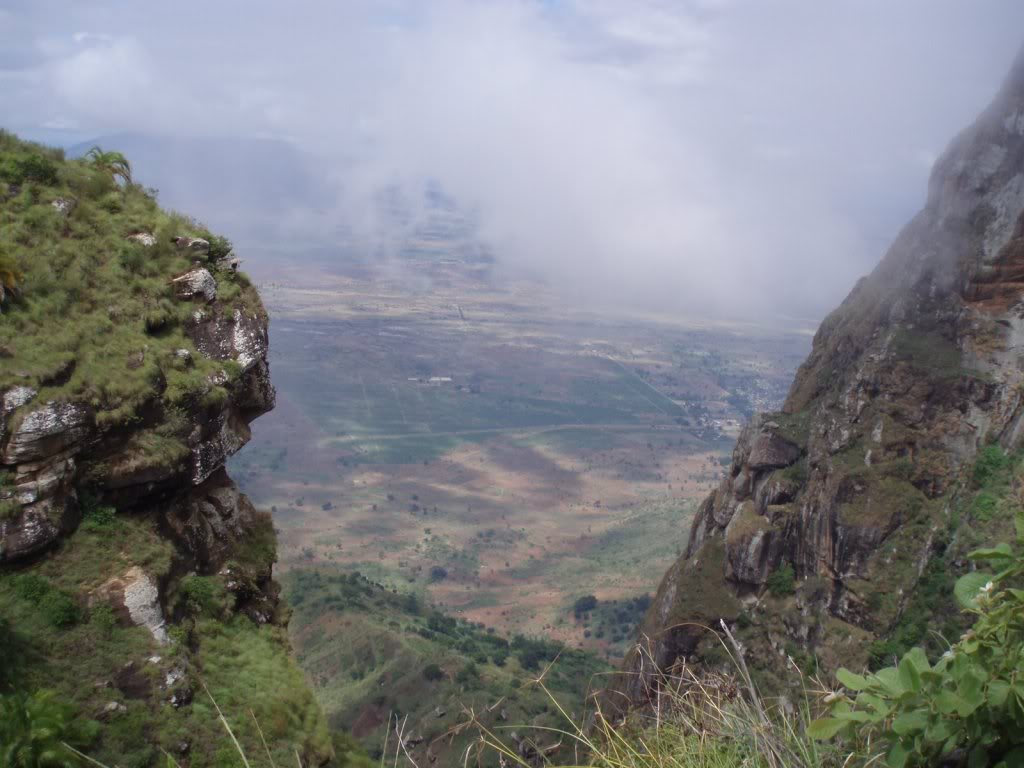
Elgeyo escapment

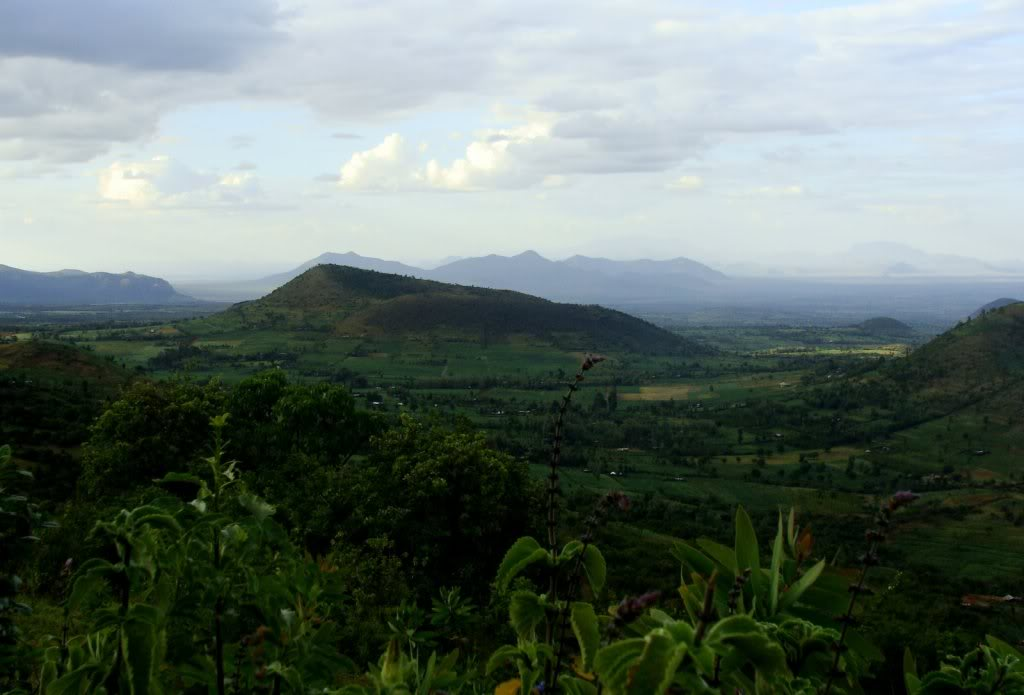
Elgeyo marakwet valley

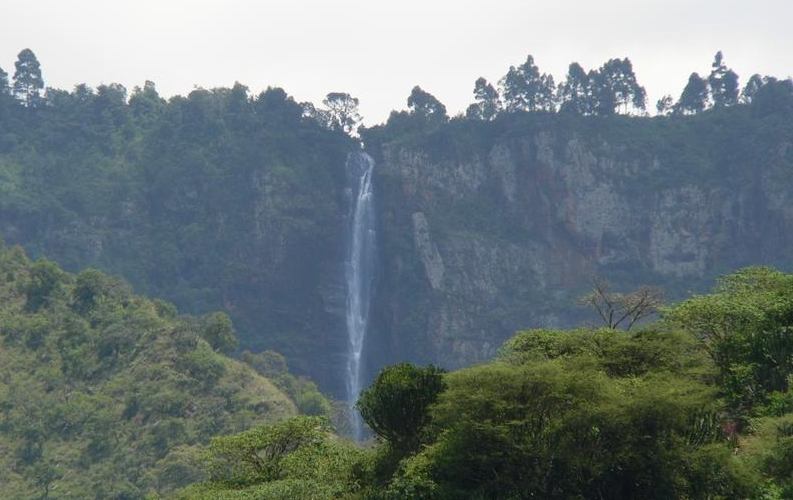
Torok waterfall

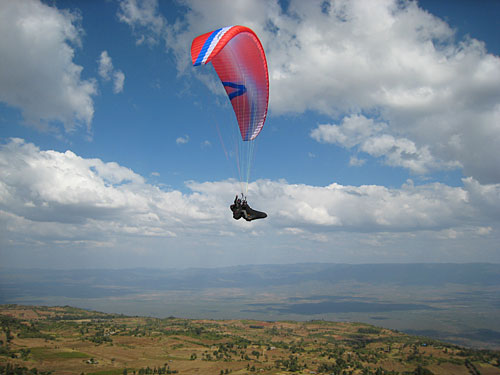
Paragliding in Kerio Escarpment near Iten.

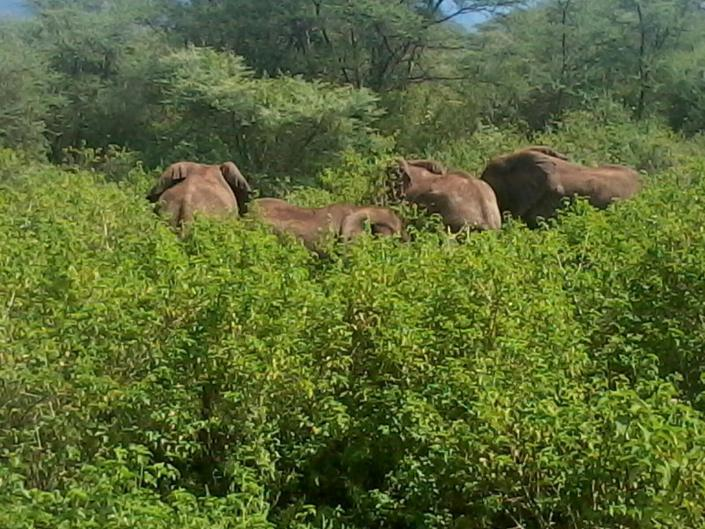
Rimoi National Park

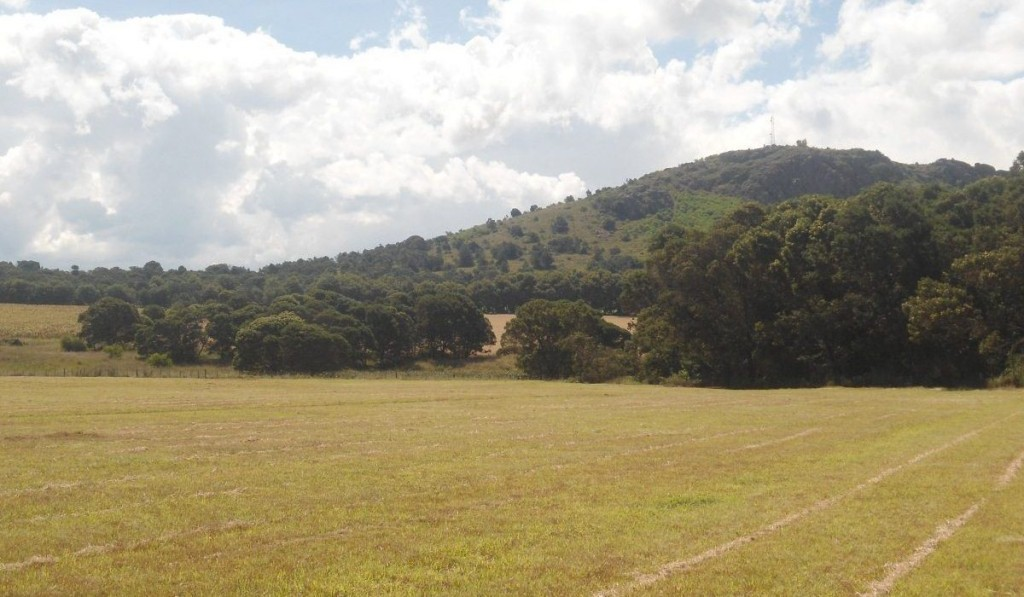
Sergoit hill

== Education systems ==
There are a total of 554 ECD centres, 418 primary schools and 112 secondary schools, 4 public technical and vocational colleges and 1 teacher training college in the county.

Schools in County
Category	No. of Public	No. of Private	Total
ECD Centres	427	127	554
Primary Schools	367	51	418
Secondary Schools	111	1	113

Indicator	Statistics
Number of Institutions (2007)	Primary (373), Secondary (75)
Primary	Enrolment (110,399)
Teacher to Pupil Ratio	1: 36 (Public Schools)
Secondary	Enrolment (20,887)
Teacher to Pupil Ratio	1:30 (Public Schools)
Tertiary	1 Teacher Training College, 3 Vocational Training Centers
Adult Literacy Classes	Enrolment (Data Not available)
Notable Secondary Schools: KEIYO NORTH; St.Patrick's High School (Iten, Kenya); Chebara Boys High School; Singore Girls Secondary School; Tambach Boys High School; Kipsoen Boys Secondary School; AIC Kessup Girls Secondary School; St. Alphonsus Mutei; St. Peters Kapkoi Day Secondary School; St Francis Kimuron Boys Secondary School; Anin Mixed Secondary; Chebonet Secondary School; Chepsigot Mixed Secondary School; KEIYO SOUTH; Maria Soti Educational Centre; Simotwo Boys High School; Kipsaos Boys Secondary School; Kapkenda Girls High School; Metkei Girls High School; Our Lady of Victory Kaptagat Girls Secondary School; St. Agatha Mokwo Girls Secondary School; St. Marys Kitany Boys Secondary School; St. Joseph Kipsaina Girls Secondary School; Koptega Girls Secondary School; Lelboinet Boys Secondary School; Biwott Mixed Day Secondary School; Kiptulos Mixed Secondary School

== Health ==
Indicator	Statistics
Health Facilities:	113 - Referral Hospitals (1), District Hospital (1), Sub-District Hospitals (5), Dispensaries (89), Health Centres (15), Medical Clinics (1), Others (1)
Doctor to Population Ratio:	1:50,000 (Marakwet), 1:156,471 (Keiyo)
Infant Mortality Rates:	57/1000 (Keiyo)
Under Five Mortality Rates:	9.7/1000 (Keiyo)
Prevalent Diseases:	Malaria, Diarrhoea, Bronchopneumonia and respiratory tract infections, urinary tract infections
Notable Hospitals:	Africa Inland Church Kapsowar Hospital.; Iten Referral Hospital.; Chebiemit District Hospital; Kocholwo Sub-County Hospital; Kaptarakwa Sub-County Hospital; Tot Sub-County Hospital; Chesongoch Mission Hospital; Kamwosor Sub County hospital; Field Marsham Medical Center; KamuJohn Medical Clinic

== Sports ==
=== Major sports activity ===
The county is notable for its long-standing tradition of producing top athletes who have represented Kenya in many international athletics events. In 2019, Iten town was awarded the World Athletics Heritage Plaque due to its contribution as a major global athletics training center.

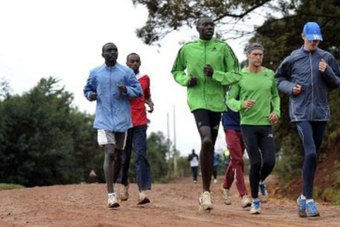
Kenyan and foreign athletes train at Iten Elgeyo Marakwet County

=== Notable sport personalities ===
Notable Athletes hailing from this county include;

- Sally Barsosio
- Richard Chelimo
- Abraham Cherono
- Vivian Cheruiyot
- Ezekiel Kemboi
- Viola Kibiwot
- Hilda Kibet
- Edna Ngeringwony Kiplagat
- Lornah Kiplagat
- Brimin Kipruto
- Wilson Kipsang Kiprotich
- Moses Kiptanui
- Kelvin Kiptum
- Evans Ruto
- Geoffrey Kamworor
- Daniel Komen
- Wilson Boit Kipketer

== Important towns ==
EMC Towns

- Arror
- Chebiemit
- Chebororwa
- Chepkorio
- Cheptongei
- Chesoi
- Chesongoch
- Chugor
- Flax
- Iten
- Koitilial
- Kapchebau
- Kapcherop
- Kapkayo
- Kapkitony
- Kapkoi
- Kaplimo
- Kapsait
- Kapsowar
- Kaptalamwa
- Kaptarakwa
- Kapteren
- Kapyego
- Katumoi
- Kipmwarer
- Kocholwo
- Kamwosor
- Kipsaos
- Kapchorwa
- Nyaru
- Tabare
- HZ
- Kondabilet
- Tenden
- Tot
- Kabulwo
- kangoo
- Tambach
- Kaptabuk
- Sangurur
- Matira

== Eminent people ==
List	Achievements	
The late Nicholas Biwott	Former Powerful Cabinet Minister in Government of President Daniel Toroitich arap Moi. Also known as 'TOTAL MAN aka KARNET'	
Kipchumba Murkomen	Elgeyo Marakwet County Senator 2013 to 2022	First deputy Majority leader of the Kenyan Senate 2nd Majority Leader of the Kenyan Senate
Philip Kiptoo Tunoi	Judge of Supreme Court of Kenya from 2012 to 2017	

== Services and urbanisation ==
Stats for Elgeyo-Marakwet County
County	Stats for the County (Per cent)
Urbanisation	14.4
Literacy	77.6
Attending School (15-18 Yrs)	84.8
Paved Roads	5.7
Good Roads	50.8
Electricity Access	7.2
Poverty Rate	55.5

== See also ==
- Kabarak
- West Pokot County
- Baringo County
- Uasin Gishu County
- Trans Nzoia County
