= Kenya Fluorspar Company =

Mining company in Kenya

- Type: Privately held company
- Industry: Mining
- Founded: 1971 (as Fluorspar Company of Kenya)
- Defunct: 2018
- Headquarters: Kimwarer, Elgeyo-Marakwet County, Kenya
- Area served: Worldwide
- Key people: Charles Field-Marsham (chairman and CEO)
- Products: Fluorite
- Website: kenyafluorspar.com

The Kenya Fluorspar Company is a mining company in Kenya, located in Kimwarer, a village in the southern part of the Kerio Valley in Elgeyo-Marakwet County, that was among the few large-scale mining and metallurgical operations in Kenya, and ranked among the country’s leading foreign exchange earners. It operated as a state corporation between 1971 and 1997 and as a private company between 1997 and 2018.

Fluorspar is mined to produce hydrofluoric acid, which is used in various applications such as in refrigerants, herbicides, pharmaceuticals, high-octane gasoline, aluminum, plastics, electrical components, fluorescent light bulbs, ceramic production and optical lens production. It is also used in the manufacture of steel, air conditioning systems, and glass fiber.

== History ==
Fluorspar deposits were first discovered in 1967 in Kenya's Kerio Valley region, in present day Elgeyo-Marakwet county. The Kenyan government established the Fluorspar Company of Kenya to exploit them on a large scale. To carry out the mining and exploration, the government acquired 3,664 hectares (9,000 acres) from approximately 1400 families in the Kerio Valley region.

In 1997, the company had become insolvent due to tough trading conditions since China had entered the fluorspar market, increasing competition causing unsustainable falling prices. The removal of the export compensation mechanism by the Government of Kenya in line with Kenya’s Economic Reforms 1996-1998, was also a key contributor to the company’s collapse.

In accordance with the Economic Reforms the Fluorspar Company of Kenya was privatized, Canadian entrepreneur, Charles Field-Marsham, purchased Kenya Fluorspar Company following an open tender process and revived Fluorspar mining in the country. Under the 1987 Mining Act the newly formed privatized Kenya Fluorspar Company Limited was granted a Mining Operating Licence and Special Mining Lease for a period of 21 years ending in March 2018, entitling the company to carry out all mining operations and exploratory drilling in the 3,664 hectares mine lease area.

By 2011 the Kenya Fluorspar Company was producing up to 100,000 -130,000 tonnes of fluorspar per year with breakthroughs to new leading European and Far East manufacturers, and a total work force of grown to 400 employees.

Citing weak global fluorspar demands, the company scaled down its operations in 2015 and temporarily stopped them in 2016. Its operations came to a halt at the end of the company’s Mining Licence and 21-year Special Mining Lease in March 2018, which coincided with a collapse in the worldwide fluorspar market, making operations unsustainable for the Kenyan mine. This left South Africa and Morocco as the only remaining African countries active in the mining of the mineral. The Kenya Fluorspar company did not renew its mining licence and lease and was wound up in compliance with the laws and regulations of the Mining Act.

In February 2024, six years after Six years after Kenya Fluorspar Company exited the fluorspar mine, Kenya’s Ministry of Mining signed a new mining contract under to revive fluorspar mining in Kerio Valley with the UK-based Soy-Fujax Mining Company, a joint venture between Soy Fluorspar(K) Limited, Fujax UK, and Fujax East Africa. The Kenya government will own a 15% stake in the new venture, intended to take care of the public interest in the mining operations in line with provisions of Kenya’s amended 2016 Mining Act.

== Operations ==
Kenya Fluorspar's mining operations took place on land leased to the company by the Government of Kenya. The land was acquired in 1976 through a compulsory purchase order and compensation paid by the government. Much of its product was exported to India and Europe. In 2005, production was valued at $14 million.

In March 2012, the company completed a de-bottlenecking of its processing plant to increase its total capacity to 120,000 tonnes, up from 108,000 tonnes in 2011.

The company asserted that it had taken various steps to address environmental concerns, such as through dust and spillage reduction, water purification and recycling, and tree planting. The company was compliant with NEMA requirements and held a certificate of environmental compliance.

== Community work and sponsorship ==
Kenya Fluorspar Company Ltd. was a leading employer in the area with 400 workers. Its corporate social responsibilities program provided health, education and other facilities to its employees and the local community.

== Corporate social responsibility ==
In 2008, the company sponsored an annual 10 km road running competition in Kerio Valley. It also sponsored the football team Fluorspar F.C., which competed in the Nationwide League.

In August 2012, the company launched a taekwondo gym known as the Kenya Fluorspar Centre in Kerio Valley.

== See also ==
- Uses of Fluorites
