= Charles Field-Marsham =

Canadian businessman

- Born: Rupert Charles Field-Marsham; 29 January 1968 (age 58)
- Education: Upper Canada College; McGill University
- Occupation: Businessman
- Spouse: Rita Field-Marsham

Rupert Charles Field-Marsham (born 29 January 1968) is a Canadian businessman based in Toronto, Ontario, Canada.

== Early life and education ==
Field-Marsham is the second son of Rupert Charles Edward Field-Marsham and his first wife, Marilyn Maughan. As a male-line descendant of Robert Marsham, 1st Baron Romney (1685–1724), he is related to the Earls of Romney. He attended Upper Canada College in Toronto and then McGill University in Montreal, where he obtained a bachelor's degree with distinction in economics and politics.

Field-Marsham is married to a Kenyan wife, Rita Field-Marsham, a lawyer and CEO of non-profit organization Key Libraries, a Canadian charity that invests in turnkey school libraries.

== Career ==
At the age of 19 and while an undergraduate at McGill University, Field-Marsham started his first successful business, Advantage Clothing. After graduating from McGill, he joined Credit Suisse First Boston in New York City as a financial analyst.

From 1993 to 2003, Field-Marsham lived in Kenya with his wife, during which time he established and acquired several companies. His first move was to open a stock brokerage, Kestrel Capital, in 1995. Kestrel Capital has become Kenya's leading stock brokerage firm. He then set up the Panafrican Group in 1996, a Komatsu distributor for mining and construction equipment across Africa. In 1997, he bought the Kenya Fluorspar Company, a loss-making state-owned company, and entered into a 20-year lease with the government. The mine was to become one of the country's leading foreign currency earners. It was described as one of the largest and lowest-cost producers of fluorspar in the world.

In 2004, Field-Marsham moved back to Canada and founded Kestrel Capital Management Corp. (KCMC) in Toronto. The company provides investment consultancy services to businesses outside of Canada. As of 2020, Field-Marsham is an investor of 7-Nation, a board sports company that owns, among other companies, Slingshot Sports.

== Philanthropy ==
- The Charles and Rita Field-Marsham Foundation – established in 2009.
- Kenya Scholar Access Project (KENSAP) – became chairman and major sponsor in 2005; an initiative that has helped secure scholarships for over 200 high-achieving disadvantaged Kenyan students in elite U.S. universities. KENSAP produced it first Harvard graduate, Kipyegon Amos Kitur, in 2009.

== See also ==
- Canadian Council on Africa
- Kenya Fluorspar Company
