= Philip Kiptoo Tunoi =

Philip Kiptoo Tunoi is a Kenyan lawyer and a retired Justice of the Supreme Court of Kenya. He also served as a Judge of the East African Court of Justice.

== Career ==
Justice Tunoi holds a bachelor's degree in law from the University of Dar es Salaam, a master's degree in philosophy from the University of Nairobi. He was awarded a PhD in philosophy from the University of Nairobi in December 2013. Justice Tunoi worked as Provincial State Counsel for Nyanza and Western provinces from 1970 to 1973 before going into private practice until 1987 and served as Justice of the High Court of Kenya between 1987-1993 and as Justice of Kenya's Court of Appeal between 1993 and 2011. Justice Tunoi has held several other positions within Kenya's judiciary and the East African Court of Justice.

In late May 2014, Justice Tunoi was served with a notice by the Chief Registrar of the Supreme Court to vacate his office by June 3 of the same year, having attained the age of 70, the mandatory age of retirement for Kenya's Judiciary. Together with High Court Justice David A. Onyancha, Justice Tunoi sued the Judicial Service Commission and the Judiciary challenging the decision to have them retired. The lawsuit arises from the fact that the Judicial Service Commission had issued two contradictory notices on the age of retirement for judges. On May 29, 2014, the High Court issued a conservatory injunction prohibiting the Judicial Service Commission from retiring both judges pending the decision of the case.

== Supreme Court career ==
When the first round of the presidential election took place on March 4, 2013. Uhuru Kenyatta was declared the president-elect of Kenya by the Independent Electoral and Boundaries Commission. Raila Odinga challenged this in the Supreme Court of Kenya.He was one of the six judges who dismissed the petition on March 30, 2013.

However, his integrity as a Supreme Court judge came under scrutiny over allegations he had received a substantial bribe to influence an election petition case against Nairobi County governor Evans Kidero that was filed by Ferdinand Waititu. Following these allegations, the President of the Republic of Kenya suspended him from office and appointed a Tribunal to investigate the allegations and to recommend his removal if evidence should confirm that he acted improperly. While the Tribunal was going on with its hearings, Justice Tunoi lost the case he had filed in the courts challenging the attempts to have him retired at 70 years. After protracted litigation, the Supreme Court delivered a ruling which effectively confirmed that he should have been retired when he turned 70. He has therefore retired from the Supreme Court without the Tribunal concluding its investigations into the bribery allegations he faced.
