= Cherang'any Hills =

Range of hills in Kenya

Cherangani Hills
- Cherang'any
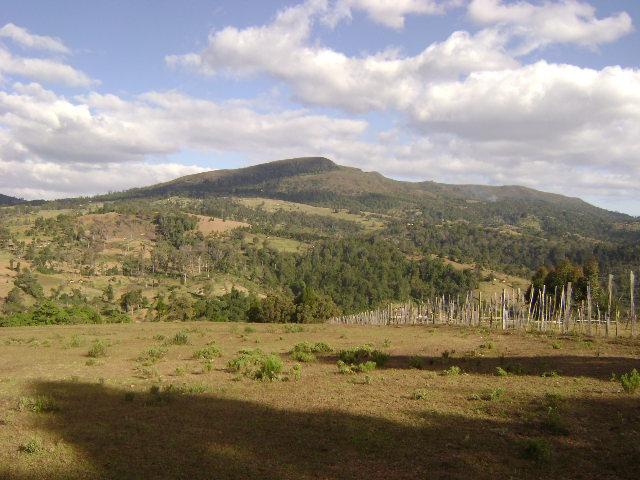

Highest point
- Elevation: 3,530 m (11,580 ft)
- Prominence: 1,521 m (4,990 ft)
- Parent peak: Mount Satima
- Coordinates: 1.26719°N 35.49962°E

Geography
- Location within Kenya

Geology
- Mountain type: Residual Mountain

The Cherang'any Hills are a range of hills in the western highlands of Kenya. The hills are one of Kenya's five main forests and catchment areas. The highlands, the large central plateau, is divided by the Mau Escarpment which rises from the border with Tanzania up to the Cherang'any Hills. The escarpment bounds the plateau that rises to the slopes of Mount Elgon. The Cherangany Hills span three counties namely Trans Nzoia, Elgeyo Marakwet and West Pokot. The highest point of the range is the summit of Nakugen at 3530 m, which can be ascended from the south from a parking space at a Kenyan Wildlife Service station, located at 1.16284°N 35.49325°E. Other notable peaks include; Chemnirot (3520 m), Kameleogon (3500 m), Chebon (3375 m), Chepkotet (3370 m), Karelachgelat (3350 m) and Sodang (3211 m). They are home to a marginalized hunter-gatherer community called the Sengwer.

== Geology ==
The Cherang'any Hills were formed due to Faulting. They form the western flank of the Gregory Rift Valley (East African Rift Valley) that stretches from Djibouti in the North to Mozambique in the South. They are located on a forested escarpment with sheer cliff walls surrounding them on three sides. Rocks found in Cherangani Hills are majorly Gneisses rich in Biotite and Muscovite. A Gneiss sample from Chepsiro, one of the smaller peaks of Cherangani was found to be containing Iron Ore. White Quartzite rocks are found in Lelan in West Pokot. Other minerals that have been recorded before by Geologists in Cherangani Hills include Red Garnets near Talau in West Pokot and Beryl in Sebit. Chromite has also been found by Geologists in the colonial era. The Cheranganyi Hills are a source to River Moiben and Chepkaitit, the Major Tributaries of River Nzoia. Visible are forested ridges and stark, rocky gorges. The hills form the source of Moiben River, one of the two tributaries of the Nzoia River, the other being Mount Elgon.

== Ecology ==
The Cherang'any Hills are monitored by the United Nations Environmental Programme as one of the five most important water catchment areas in Kenya. As of the last report, monitoring the change in forestation between 2000 and 2003, the Cherang'any Hills were the least affected of the forests monitored, with 174.3 hectares deforested, this loss is occurring within Marakwet District and West Pokot District. Since this forest cover is indigenous, the report recommends that the area be closely watched to prevent further destruction. The thirteen forest reserves there are collectively known as the Cherangani Hills Forest.

The De Brazza's monkey has been sighted here. The monkeys are confined to small areas in the Cherang'any Hills that offer them little protection.

== See also ==
- Mount Elgon
- Mount Moroto
- Elgeyo Escarpment
