= Rift Valley Province =

Province of Kenya

Rift Valley Province Mkoa wa Bonde la Ufa
- Former Province
- Location in Kenya
- Coordinates: 0°30′N 36°0′E
- Country: Kenya
- No. of Counties: 14
- Capital: Nakuru

Area
  - Total: 182,505.1 km^{2} (70,465.6 sq mi)

Population (2009)
  - Total: 10,006,805
  - Density: 54.83028/km^{2} (142.0098/sq mi)
- Time zone: UTC+3 (EAT)

Rift Valley Province (Swahili: Mkoa wa Bonde la Ufa) of Kenya, bordering Uganda, was one of Kenya's eight provinces, before the 2013 Kenyan general election. Rift Valley Province was the largest and one of the most economically important provinces in Kenya. It was dominated by the Kenya Rift Valley which passes through it and gave the province its name. According to the 2009 Census, the former province covered an area of 182,505.1 square kilometres (45,098,000 acres; 70,465.6 sq mi) and would have had a population of 10,006,805, making it the largest and most populous province in the country. The bulk of the provincial population inhabited a strip between former Nairobi and Nyanza Province. The capital was the town of Nakuru.

== Counties ==
As of March 2013 after the Kenyan general election, 2013, the Province was partitioned into counties and Rift Valley Province was dissolved.

Code	County	Former Province	Area (km^{2})	Population Census 2009	Capital
23	Turkana	Rift Valley	71,597.8	855,399	Lodwar
24	West Pokot	Rift Valley	8,418.2	512,690	Kapenguria
25	Samburu	Rift Valley	20,182.5	223,947	Maralal
26	Trans Nzoia	Rift Valley	2,469.9	818,757	Kitale
27	Uasin Gishu	Rift Valley	2,955.3	894,179	Eldoret
28	Elgeyo-Marakwet	Rift Valley	3,049.7	369,998	Iten
29	Nandi	Rift Valley	2,884.5	752,965	Kapsabet
30	Baringo	Rift Valley	11,075.3	555,561	Kabarnet
31	Laikipia	Rift Valley	8,696.1	399,227	Nanyuki
32	Nakuru	Rift Valley	7,509.5	1,603,325	Nakuru
33	Narok	Rift Valley	17,921.2	850,920	Narok
34	Kajiado	Rift Valley	21,292.7	687,312	Kajiado
35	Kericho	Rift Valley	2,454.5	752,396	Kericho
36	Bomet	Rift Valley	1,997.9	730,129	Bomet
	Totals		182,505.1	10,006,805	-

== Geography ==
Map of Kenya, showing its provinces

The Great Rift Valley runs south through Kenya from Lake Turkana in the north and has several unique geographical features, including the Elgeyo escarpment which is a popular tourist attraction.

Apart from the Rift Valley itself, the area has other important geographic features such as: the extinct volcanoes Mount Longonot and Mount Suswa and Lake Baringo, Lake Bogoria, Lake Magadi, Lake Nakuru, Lake Naivasha, the Suguta Valley, and Lake Turkana.

== Geology ==
A large part of Kenya is underlain by Precambrian basement, while the Kenya rift basin (a typical extensional basin) hosts Tertiary volcanics that cover Mesozoic sediments (Recently these sediments have been considered for oil exploration). The sedimentary basins evolved along the Anza trough during the Late Paleozoic to Early Tertiary times through extension tectonics during the major Gondwanaland breakup. In the Miocene Period, the region underwent intermittent uplift and subsidence along major boundary faults accompanied by a large outpouring of lava flows. The Anza trough intersects the modern rift valley in the area of Lake Turkana. Rifting still continues today; primarily in the north, where active volcanoes are more plentiful.

== Economy ==
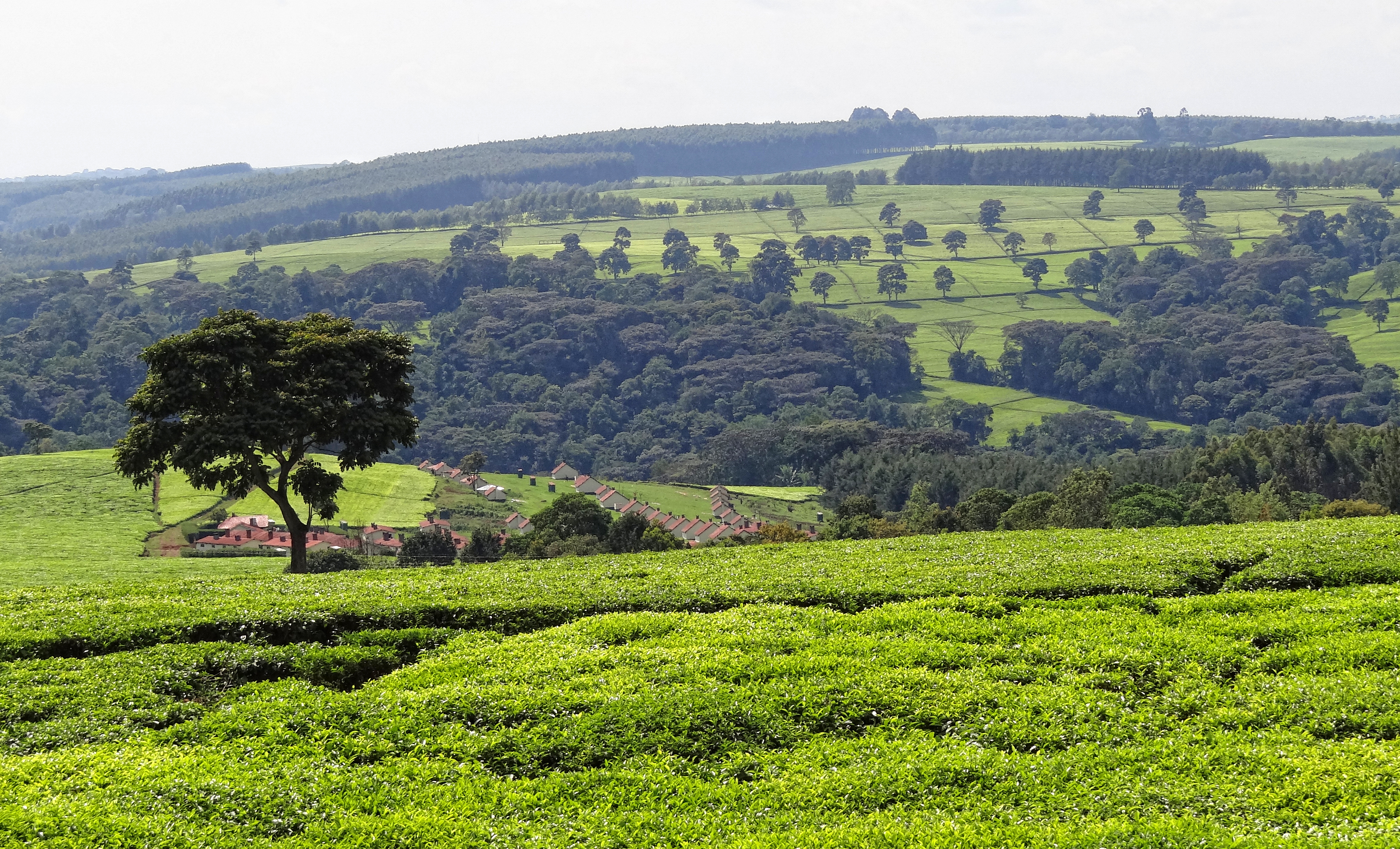
A tea plantation near Kericho in the Kenyan highlands.

The highlands provide adequate rainfall for farming and agriculture which is the economic base of the residents of the Rift Valley. Tea from the highlands in the Kericho district enjoys a worldwide reputation, but horticulture is an important part of the district's economy and cattle raising is also practised to a large extent.

The full economic potential of the Rift Valley region is, however, far from fully exploited, though the current growth in population and improved education may change this in a near future. People in the province are still mostly rural, but urbanisation is gradually increasing; new cities and towns contain the rural-urban migration and, provided the right policies are instituted, the Rift Valley province will be able to emerge as a national economic and cultural hub.

== Ethnicity ==
The Rift Valley is home to various communities. The people of the Rift Valley are a mesh work of different ethnic identities, and the Kalenjin and the Maasai are two of the best known ethnic groups. Most of Kenya's top runners come from the Kalenjin community. The Maasai people have the most recognizable cultural identity, both nationally and internationally, and serve as Kenya's international cultural symbol.

== See also ==
- Kerio River
