= Kerio River =

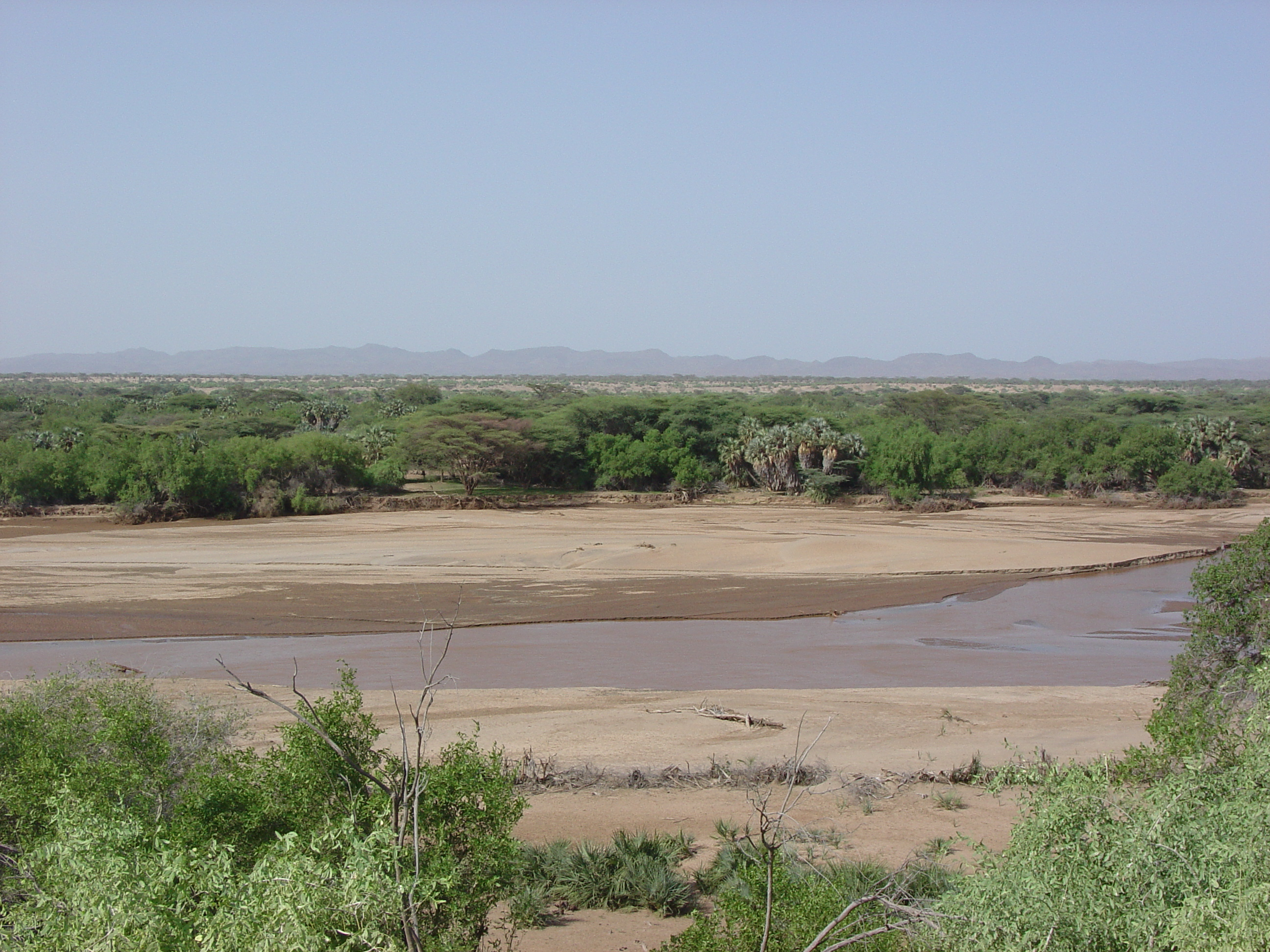
- Kerio River flowing after heavy spring rainstorms in the area

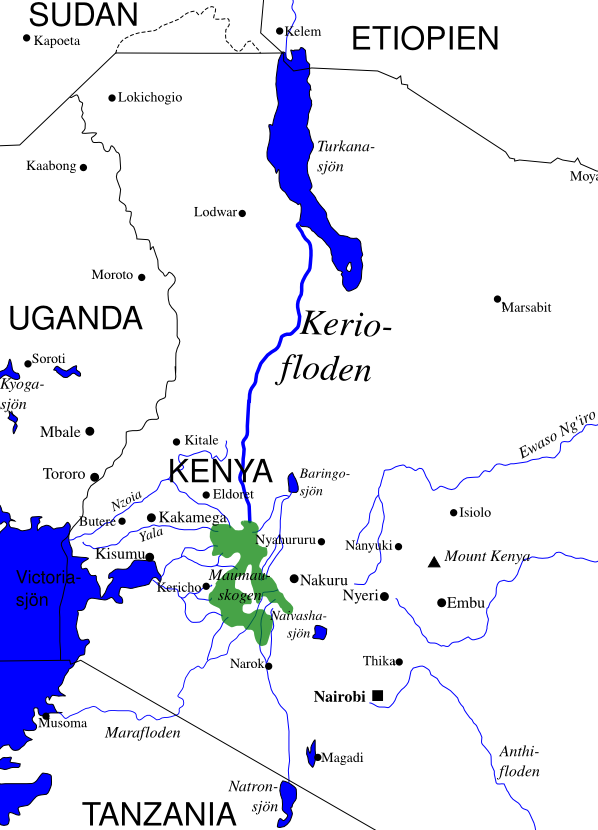
- River course

Physical characteristics
- Source
  - coordinates: 0.528581°N 35.709643°E
- Mouth
  - coordinates: 2.956584°N 36.151543°E
- Length: 400 km (250 mi)
- Basin size: 13,000 km^{2} (5,000 sq mi)

The Kerio River is a river in Turkana County, Kenya. It flows northward into Lake Turkana. It is one of the longest rivers in Kenya (about 400 km (250 mi)), originating near the equator.

== Course ==
The Kerio River rises on the north slopes of the Amasya Hills to the west of Lake Bogoria. It flows northward through the Kerio Valley between Tugen Hills and Elgeyo Escarpment. The Elgeyo Escarpment rises to over 1,830 metres (6,000 ft) above the Kerio valley in places. The Kerio continues northward, often through deep and narrow valleys, to enter Lake Turkana in a delta just south of the delta formed by the Turkwel and Lokichar rivers. The Kerio and Turkwel contribute 98% of the river water flowing into Lake Turkana on Kenyan territory (which makes up only 2% of the total riverine inflow). In their lower courses both these rivers are seasonal.

Near its source the Kerio River is fed by two major tributaries flowing down the Elgeyo Escarpment: Arror River, and Embobut River.

== Land use ==
The Lake Kamnarok National Reserve and Kerio Valley National Reserve lie on the east and west sides of the Kerio River in the upper valley. They are undeveloped, but have abundant birdlife and are known for their scenery. The left bank of a 25 kilometres (16 mi) section of the river is in the South Turkana National Reserve.

In 1999 there were allegations that Fluorspar Mines was dumping toxic waste into the river. These were denied by the responsible Minister for Mineral Exploration. The main locations in Turkana District for irrigated agriculture are along the Turkwel and Kerio rivers. The Lotubai and Morulem irrigation schemes are on the Kerio. The main crops are maize and sorghum, which account for 80% of irrigated crops, as well as green grams, cowpeas, bananas, mangoes, oranges and guavas.

== Gallery ==
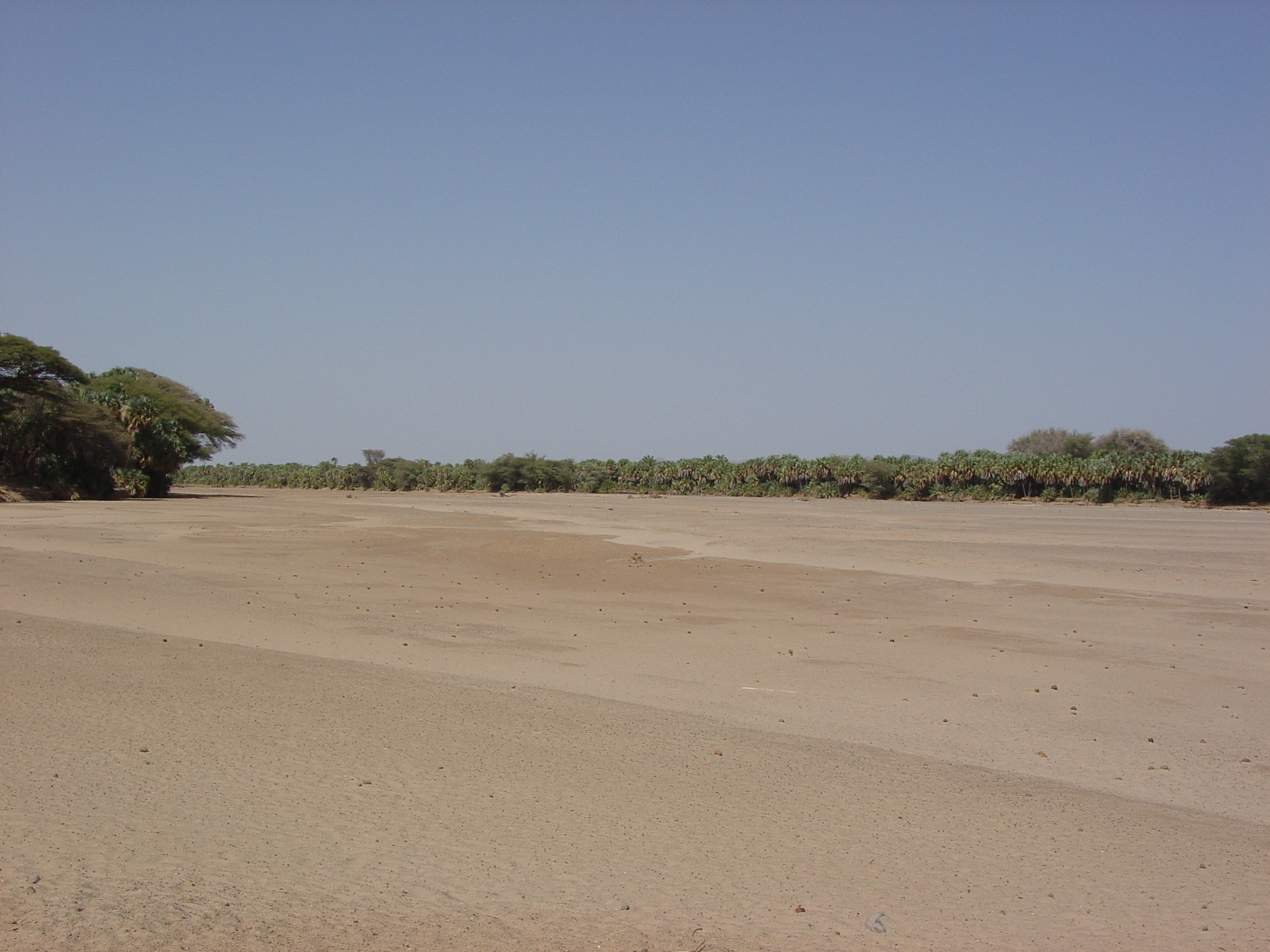
Kerio River during dry season. Riverbed is silty and easily erodes during storm events.

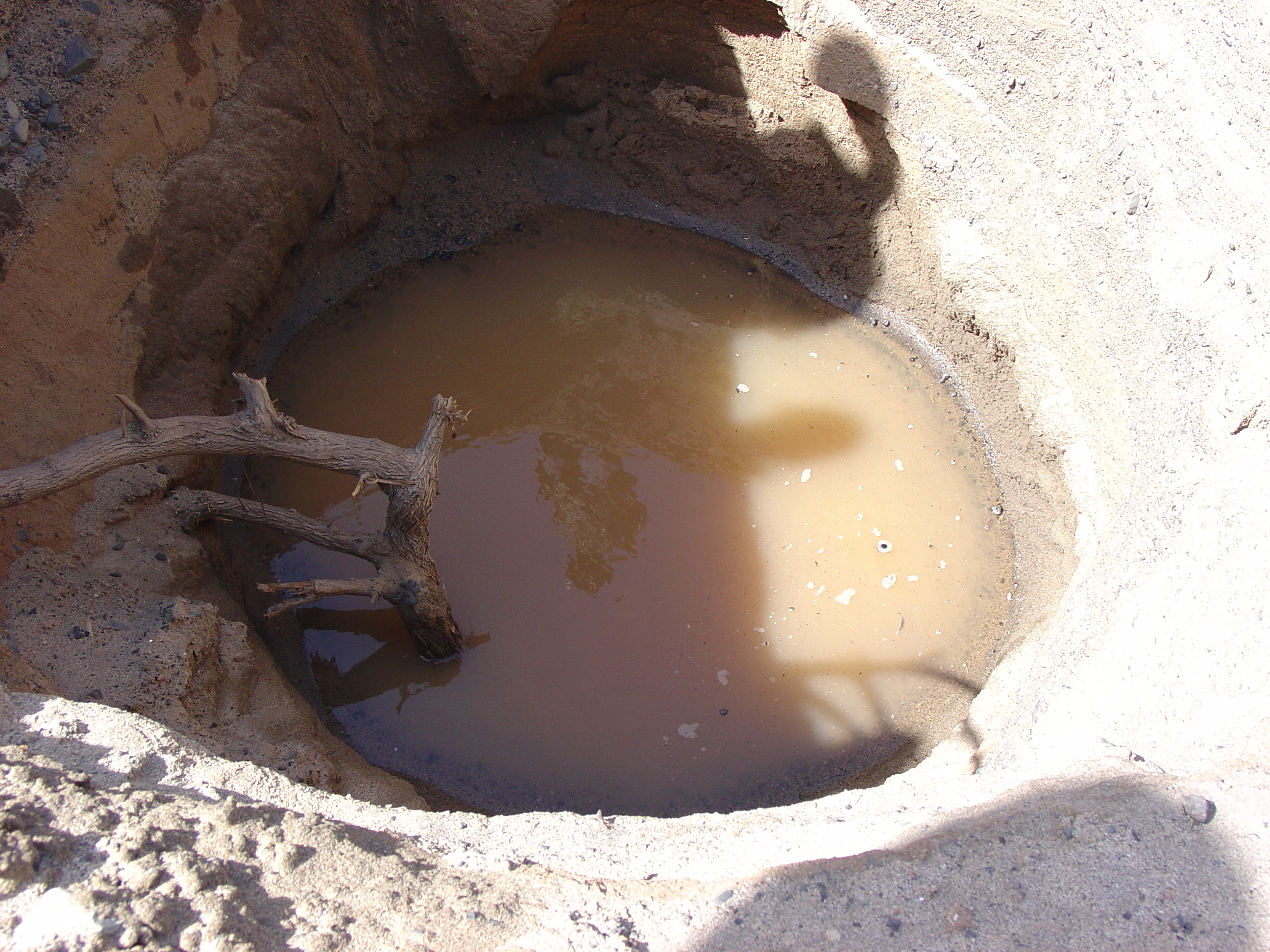
Hand dug well in riverbed.

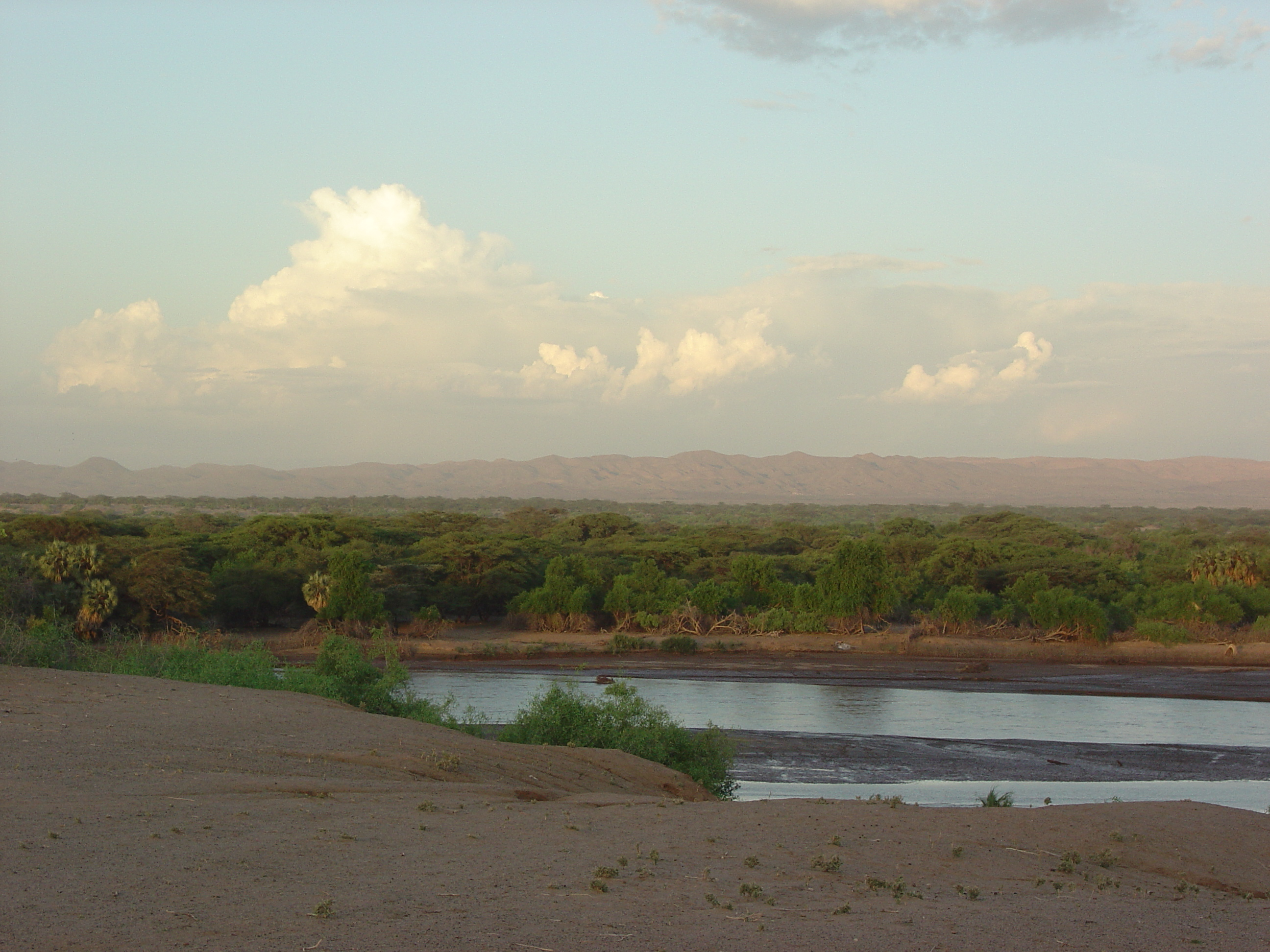
Kerio River flowing after heavy rainstorm.

== See also ==
- Biretwo
- List of rivers of Africa
- Turkana people

== Sources ==
- Fitzpatrick, Mary; Parkinson, Tom; Ray, Nick (2006). East África. Lonely Planet. ISBN 1-74104-286-0.
- Hughes, R. H.; Hughes, J. S. (1992). A directory of African wetlands. IUCN. ISBN 2-88032-949-3.
- Kalweo (7 December 1999). "Dumping of Toxins into River Keria". Parliamentary Debates.
- Watson, D.J.; van Binsbergen, J. (2008). Livelihood diversification opportunities for pastoralists in Turkana, Kenya. ILRI (aka ILCA and ILRAD). ISBN 978-92-9146-210-0.
