= Elgeyo Escarpment =

Fault-scarp

Coordinates: 0.8620°N 35.5760°E

The Elgeyo Escarpment is a fault-scarp caused by post-Miocene faulting. Miocene beds are still visible. The escarpment is part of the western wall of the Great Rift Valley.

The northwest part of Kenya has three main geographic zones running in parallel from north to south. There is the highland plateau, which rises gradually to 3,350 meters above sea level, on the Cherangani Hills. In the intermediate zone is the Elgeyo Escarpment which rapidly gives way to the lower Kerio Valley. The yearly rainfall in the escarpment area ranges between 1000–1400 mm.

== See also ==
- List of escarpments
