= Sub-Saharan Africa =

Regions south of the Sahara

- Geographical map of sub-Saharan Africa The Sahara The Sahel Sub-Saharan Africa
- Largest cities: 10 largest cities in sub-Saharan Africa: 1. (Democratic Republic of the Congo) Kinshasa; 2. (Nigeria) Lagos; 3. (Angola) Luanda; 4. (Tanzania) Dar es Salaam; 5. (South Africa) Johannesburg; 6. (Ivory Coast) Abidjan; 7. (Ethiopia) Addis Ababa; 8. (Kenya) Nairobi; 9. (South Africa) Cape Town; 10. (Cameroon) Yaoundé

Population (2021) (Note: Per UNHCR Global Trends in 2019, the sub-Saharan population was 1.1 billion.)
  - Total: ▲1,137,938,708
- Demonyms: Sub-Saharan African

Religions (2020)
  - Christianity: 62.0%
  - Islam: 32.8%
  - No religion: 2.6%
  - Other: 2.5%
  - Hinduism: 0.1%
- Countries: 49 countries: Angola; Benin; Botswana; Burkina Faso; Burundi; Cameroon; Cape Verde; Central African Republic; Chad; Comoros; Democratic Republic of the Congo; Republic of the Congo; Djibouti; Equatorial Guinea; Eritrea; Eswatini; Ethiopia; Gabon; Gambia; Ghana; Guinea; Guinea-Bissau; Ivory Coast; Kenya; Lesotho; Liberia; Madagascar; Malawi; Mali; Mauritania; Mauritius; Mozambique; Namibia; Niger; Nigeria; Rwanda; São Tomé and Príncipe; Senegal; Seychelles; Sierra Leone; Somalia; South Africa; South Sudan; Sudan; Tanzania; Togo; Uganda; Zambia; Zimbabwe
- Languages: Over 1,000 languages
- Internet TLD: .africa

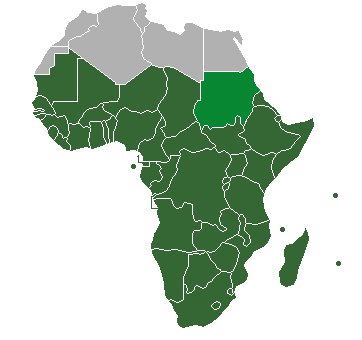
Combined green: Definition of "sub-Saharan Africa" as used in the statistics of United Nations institutions Lighter green: Sudan, classified as a part of North Africa by the United Nations Statistics Division instead of Eastern Africa, though the organization states that "the assignment of countries or areas to specific groupings is for statistical convenience and does not imply any assumption regarding political or other affiliation of countries or territories."

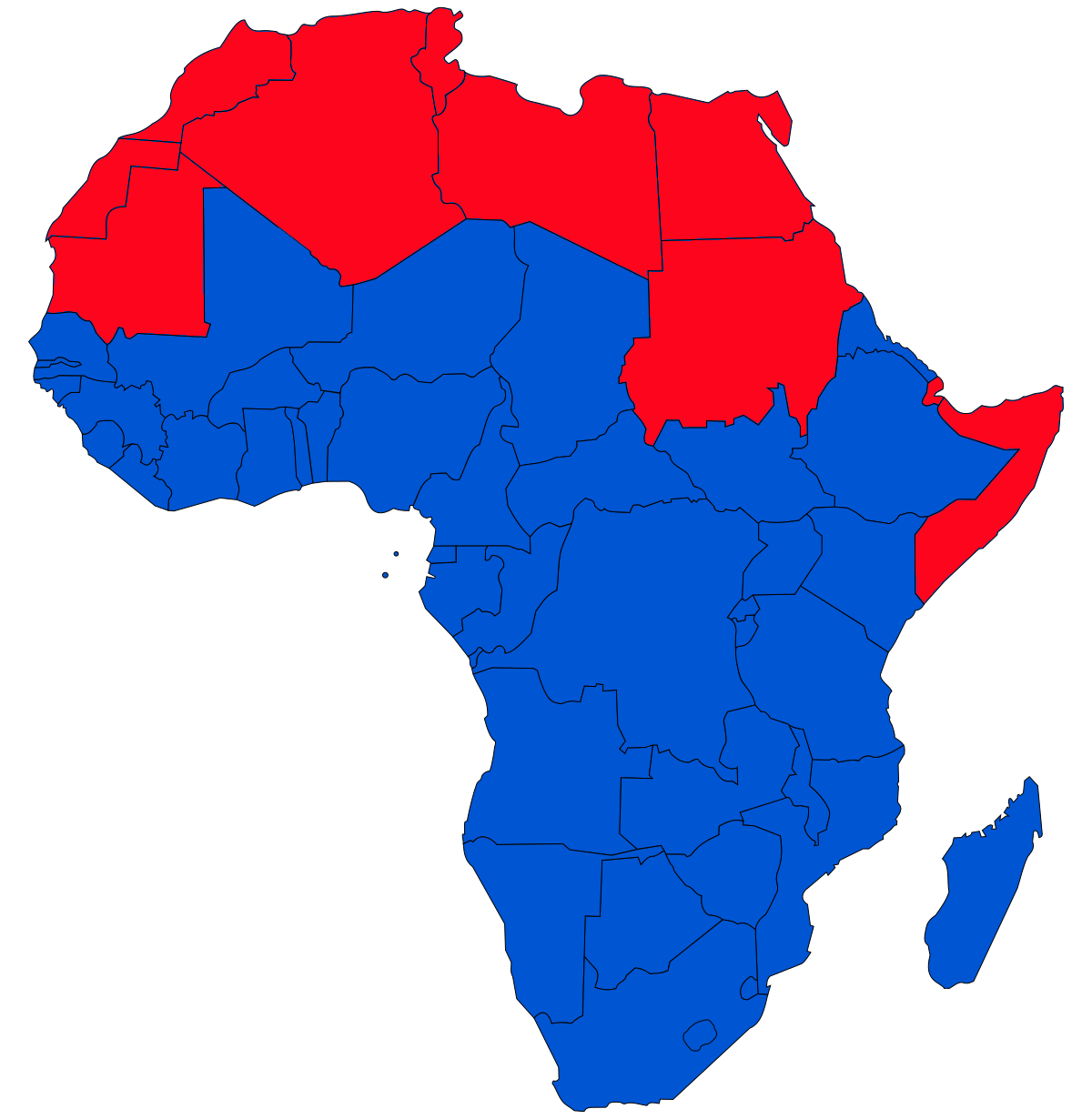
Red: Arab states in Africa (Arab League and UNESCO)

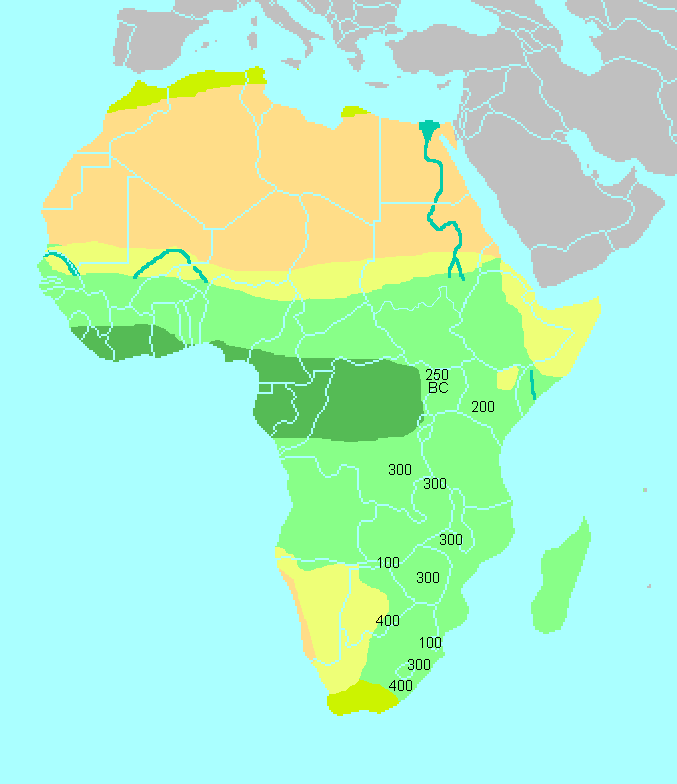
Simplified climatic map of Africa: sub-Saharan Africa consists of the Sahel and the Horn of Africa in the north (yellow), the tropical savannas (light green) and the tropical rainforests (dark green) of Equatorial Africa, and the arid Kalahari Basin (yellow) and the "Mediterranean" south coast (olive) of Southern Africa. The numbers shown correspond to the dates of all Iron Age artifacts associated with the Bantu expansion.

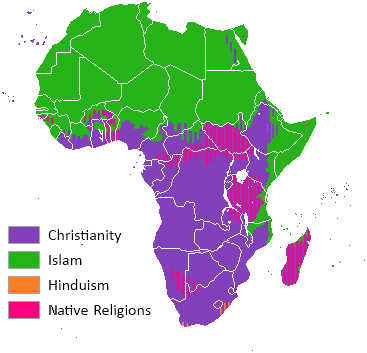
The distribution of religions in Africa.

Sub-Saharan Africa (Note: Shortened to Subsahara and abbreviated as SSA.) is the areas and regions of the continent of Africa that lie south of the Sahara. These include a great majority of Mainland Africa, including the Sahel, and Madagascar. Geopolitically, in addition to the African countries and territories that are situated fully in that specified region, the term may also include polities that only have part of their territory located in that region, per the definition of the United Nations (UN). This is considered a non-standardised geographical region with the number of countries included varying from 46 to 48 depending on the organisation describing the region (e.g. UN, WHO, World Bank, etc.). The African Union (AU) uses a different regional breakdown, recognising all 55 member states on the continent and grouping them into five distinct and standard regions.

The term serves as a grouping counterpart to North Africa, which is instead grouped with the definition of MENA (Middle East and North Africa) as it is part of the Arab world, and most North African states are likewise members of both the Arab League and the AU. However, while they are also member states of the Arab League, the Comoros, Djibouti, Mauritania, and Somalia (and sometimes Sudan) are all geographically considered to be part of sub-Saharan Africa. Overall, the UN Development Programme applies the "sub-Saharan" classification to 46 of Africa's 55 countries, excluding Djibouti, SADR, Somalia, and Sudan.

Since around 3900 BCE, the Saharan and sub-Saharan regions of Africa have been separated by the extremely harsh climate of the sparsely populated Sahara, forming an effective barrier that is interrupted only by the Nile in Sudan, though navigation on the Nile was blocked by the Sudd and the river's cataracts. The Sahara pump theory explains how flora and fauna (including Homo sapiens) left Africa to penetrate Eurasia and beyond. African pluvial periods are associated with a "Wet Sahara" phase, during which larger lakes and more rivers existed.

== Nomenclature and conceptual criticism ==
Geographers historically divided the region into several distinct ethnographic sections based on each area's respective inhabitants. The concept of "sub-Saharan Africa" has been criticised as a racist construction intended to separate Africa. Critics from various countries have provided arguments supporting the interconnectedness of continental Africa, pointing to historical and cultural connections, as well as trade between North, West, and East Africa. Another source of criticism has been that traditional racial taxonomy which has arbitrarily divided separated Africa into a white "northern" Africa and black "southern" Africa, has overlooked common genetic links and regional diversity across the continent.

Commentators in Arabic in the medieval period used the general term bilâd as-sûdân ("Land of the Blacks") for the vast Sudan region (an expression denoting Central and West Africa), or sometimes extending from the coast of West Africa to Western Sudan. Its equivalent in Southeast Africa was Zanj ("Country of the Blacks"), which referred primarily to the Swahili coast.

The geographers drew an explicit ethnographic distinction between the Sudan region and its analogue Zanj, from the area to their extreme east on the Red Sea coast in the Horn of Africa. In modern-day Ethiopia and Eritrea was Al-Habash or Abyssinia, which was inhabited by the Habash or Abyssinians, who were the forebears of the Habesha. In northern Somalia was Barbara or the Bilad al-Barbar ("Land of the Berbers"), which was inhabited by the Eastern Baribah or Barbaroi, as the ancestors of the Somalis were referred to by medieval Arab and ancient Greek geographers, respectively.

Various geographical conceptualizations of sub-Saharan Africa

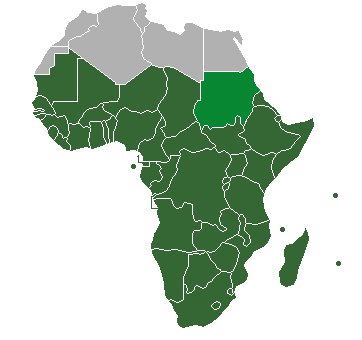
Combined green: Definition of "sub-Saharan Africa" as used in the statistics of United Nations institutions
Lighter green: Sudan, classified as a part of North Africa by the United Nations Statistics Division instead of Eastern Africa, though the organization states that "the assignment of countries or areas to specific groupings is for statistical convenience and does not imply any assumption regarding political or other affiliation of countries or territories."

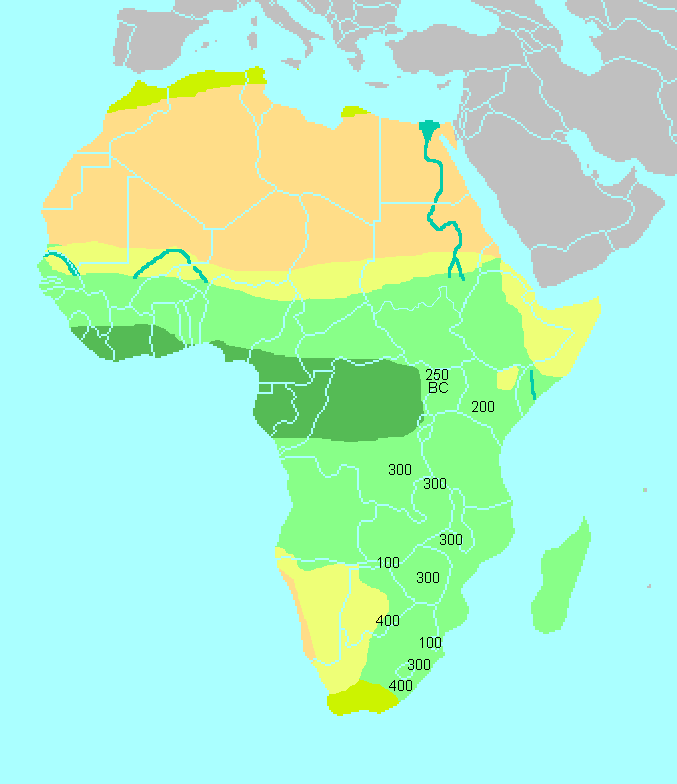
Simplified climatic map of Africa: sub-Saharan Africa consists of the Sahel and the Horn of Africa in the north (yellow), the tropical savannas (light green) and the tropical rainforests (dark green) of Equatorial Africa, and the arid Kalahari Basin (yellow) and the "Mediterranean" south coast (olive) of Southern Africa. The numbers shown correspond to the dates of all Iron Age artifacts associated with the Bantu expansion.

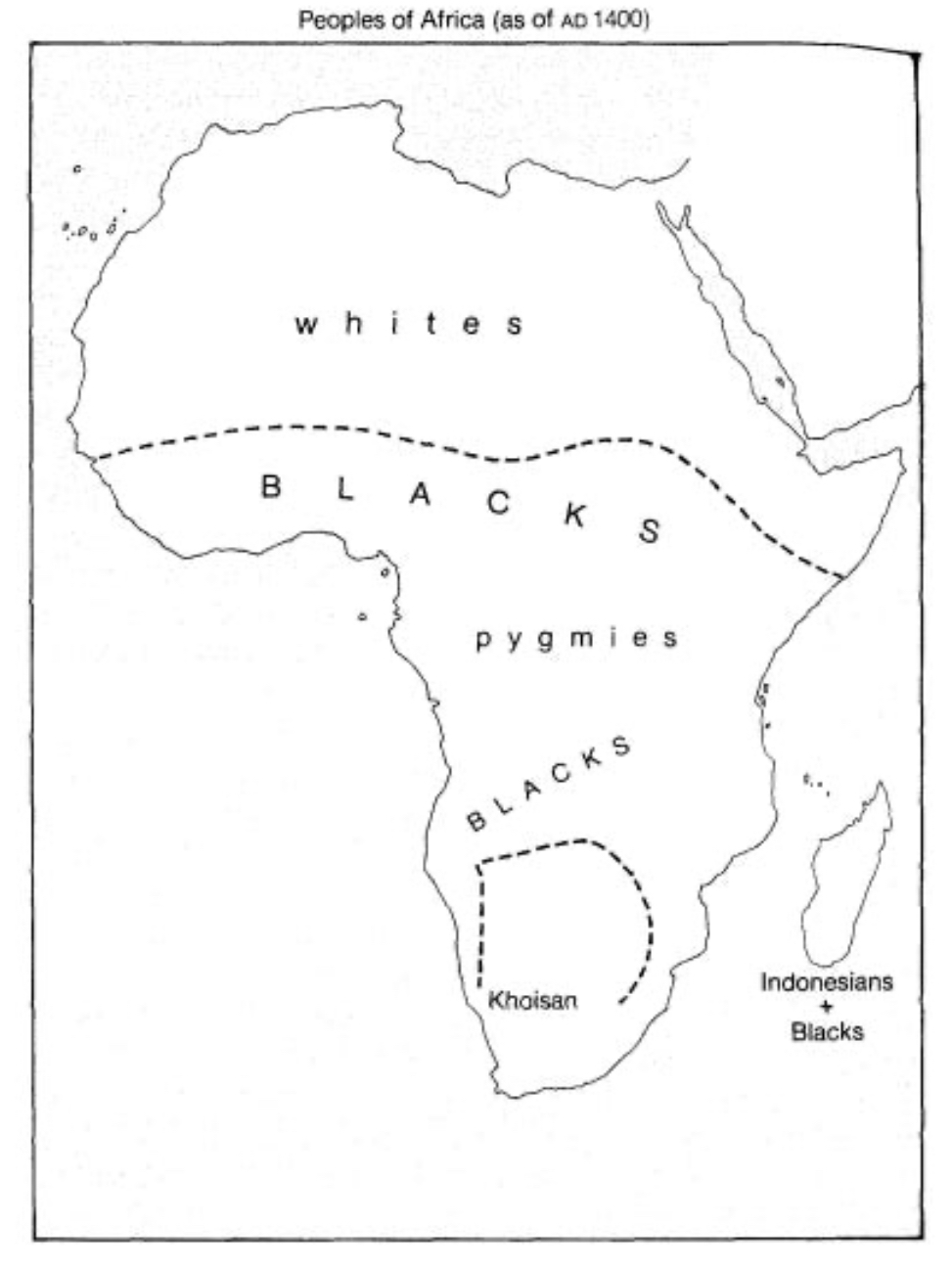
Simplified map of Africa's major population groups from Jared Diamond's Guns, Germs, and Steel, depicting the spread of Bantu peoples ("Blacks") across much of sub-Saharan Africa and other ethnic groups, such as Berbers/Copts ("whites"), Pygmy peoples, the Khoisan, and Austronesian peoples ("Indonesians"). The map's racial categories and title have been widely criticised as outdated and echoing colonial-era classifications.

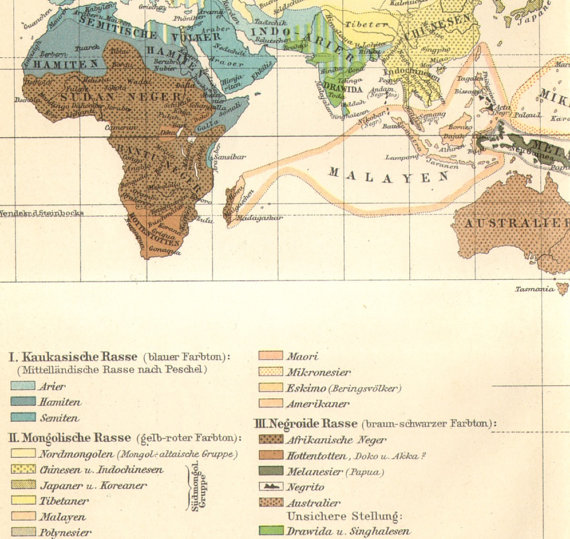
Ethnographic map of Africa, from Meyers Blitz-Lexikon (1932)

== List of countries and regional organisation ==
Sub-Saharan Africa is composed of 49 countries. Only six African countries are not geopolitically a part of sub-Saharan Africa: Algeria, Egypt, Libya, Morocco, Tunisia and Western Sahara (claimed by Morocco); they form the UN subregion of Northern Africa, which also makes up the largest bloc of the Arab World. Nevertheless, some international organisations include Sudan as part of North Africa. Although a long-standing member of the Arab League, Sudan has around 30% non-Arab populations in the west (Darfur, Masalit, Zaghawa), far north (Nubian) and south (Kordofan, Nuba), and a large mixed native Nubian and Arab population (not just Arabized), that represents the majority at 70% hence its inclusion in North Africa. Geopolitically, culturally, historically and economically, Sudan has long standing relationships with the wider Arab world. Its most notable connections flow North to Egypt and East across the Red Sea to Saudi Arabia, Qatar, UAE and Sudan is seen as a geostrategic Red Sea state in the wider Middle East and North African region.. Mauritania and Niger only include a band of the Sahel along their southern borders. All other African countries have at least significant portions of their territory within sub-Saharan Africa.

African countries by region
Region	Subregion	Country	Capital	Currency	Language(s)
Central Africa	Economic Community of Central African States	Angola	Luanda	Angolan kwanza (Kz)	Portuguese
Central Africa	Economic Community of Central African States	Burundi	Gitega	Burundian franc (FBu)	Kirundi, French, English
Central Africa	Economic Community of Central African States	Democratic Republic of the Congo	Kinshasa	Congolese franc (FC)	French
Central Africa	Economic Community of Central African States	São Tomé and Príncipe	São Tomé	São Tomé and Príncipe dobra (Db)	Portuguese
Central Africa	CEMAC	Cameroon	Yaoundé	Central African CFA franc (FCFA)	English, French
Central Africa	CEMAC	Central African Republic	Bangui	Central African CFA franc (FCFA)	Sango, French
Central Africa	CEMAC	Chad	N'Djamena	Central African CFA franc (FCFA)	French, Arabic
Central Africa	CEMAC	Republic of the Congo	Brazzaville	Central African CFA franc (FCFA)	French
Central Africa	CEMAC	Equatorial Guinea	Ciudad de la Paz	Central African CFA franc (FCFA)	Spanish, French
Central Africa	CEMAC	Gabon	Libreville	Central African CFA franc (FCFA)	French
East Africa	Economic Community of Central African States / Horn	Sudan	Khartoum	Sudanese pound (£S.)	Arabic (Sudanese Arabic), English
East Africa	Economic Community of Central African States / Horn	South Sudan	Juba	South Sudanese pound (£)	English, Arabic (Juba Arabic)
East Africa	Economic Community of Central African States / Horn	Somalia	Mogadishu	Somali shilling (So.Sh)	Somali, Arabic
East Africa	Economic Community of Central African States / Horn	Kenya	Nairobi	Kenyan shilling (KSh /=)	Swahili, English
East Africa	Economic Community of Central African States / Horn	Uganda	Kampala	Ugandan shilling (USh /=)	Swahili, English
East Africa	Economic Community of Central African States / Horn	Rwanda	Kigali	Rwandan franc (RF)	Kinyarwanda, English, French, Swahili
East Africa	Economic Community of Central African States / Horn	Tanzania	Dodoma	Tanzanian shilling (TSh /=)	Swahili, English
East Africa	Economic Community of Central African States / Horn	Burundi	Gitega	Burundian franc (FBu)	Kirundi, French
East Africa	Economic Community of Central African States / Horn	Eritrea	Asmara	Eritrean nakfa (Nfk)	Tigrinya, Arabic, Italian, English
East Africa	Economic Community of Central African States / Horn	Djibouti	Djibouti	Djiboutian franc (Fdj)	Arabic, French
Southern Africa	Southern African Development Community	Angola	Luanda	Angolan kwanza (Kz)	Portuguese
Southern Africa	Southern African Development Community	Botswana	Gaborone	Botswana pula (P)	Tswana, English
Southern Africa	Southern African Development Community	Comoros	Moroni	Comorian franc (FC)	Comorian, Arabic, French
Southern Africa	Southern African Development Community	Eswatini	Mbabane	Swazi lilangeni (L/E)	SiSwati, English
Southern Africa	Southern African Development Community	Lesotho	Maseru	Lesotho loti (L/M)	Sesotho, English
Southern Africa	Southern African Development Community	Madagascar	Antananarivo	Malagasy ariary (Ar.)	Malagasy, French
Southern Africa	Southern African Development Community	Malawi	Lilongwe	Malawian kwacha (MK)	English
Southern Africa	Southern African Development Community	Mauritius	Port Louis	Mauritian rupee (Re/Rs)	English
Southern Africa	Southern African Development Community	Mozambique	Maputo	Mozambican metical (MTn)	Portuguese
Southern Africa	Southern African Development Community	Namibia	Windhoek	Namibian dollar (N$)	English
Southern Africa	Southern African Development Community	Seychelles	Victoria	Seychellois rupee (Re/Rs)	Seychellois Creole, English, French
Southern Africa	Southern African Development Community	South Africa	Pretoria / Cape Town / Bloemfontein	South African rand (R)	11 official languages
Southern Africa	Southern African Development Community	Zambia	Lusaka	Zambian kwacha (ZK)	English
Southern Africa	Southern African Development Community	Zimbabwe	Harare	Zimbabwean dollar ($)	English
West Africa	ECOWAS	Ivory Coast	Yamoussoukro / Abidjan	West African CFA franc (CFA)	
West Africa	ECOWAS	The Gambia	Banjul	Gambian dalasi (D)	
West Africa	ECOWAS	Ghana	Accra	Ghanaian cedi (GH₵)	
West Africa	ECOWAS	Guinea	Conakry	Guinean franc (FG)	
West Africa	ECOWAS	Liberia	Monrovia	Liberian dollar (L$)	
West Africa	ECOWAS	Mauritania	Nouakchott	Mauritanian ouguiya (UM)	
West Africa	ECOWAS	Nigeria	Abuja	Nigerian naira (₦)	
West Africa	ECOWAS	Sierra Leone	Freetown	Sierra Leonean leone (Le)	
West Africa	West African Economic and Monetary Union	Benin	Porto-Novo	West African CFA franc (CFA)	
West Africa	West African Economic and Monetary Union	Burkina Faso	Ouagadougou	West African CFA franc (CFA)	
West Africa	West African Economic and Monetary Union	Ivory Coast	Yamoussoukro / Abidjan	West African CFA franc (CFA)	
West Africa	West African Economic and Monetary Union	Guinea-Bissau	Bissau	West African CFA franc (CFA)	
West Africa	West African Economic and Monetary Union	Mali	Bamako	West African CFA franc (CFA)	
West Africa	West African Economic and Monetary Union	Niger	Niamey	West African CFA franc (CFA)	
West Africa	West African Economic and Monetary Union	Senegal	Dakar	West African CFA franc (CFA)	
West Africa	West African Economic and Monetary Union	Togo	Lomé	West African CFA franc (CFA)	

== History ==
=== Prehistory ===
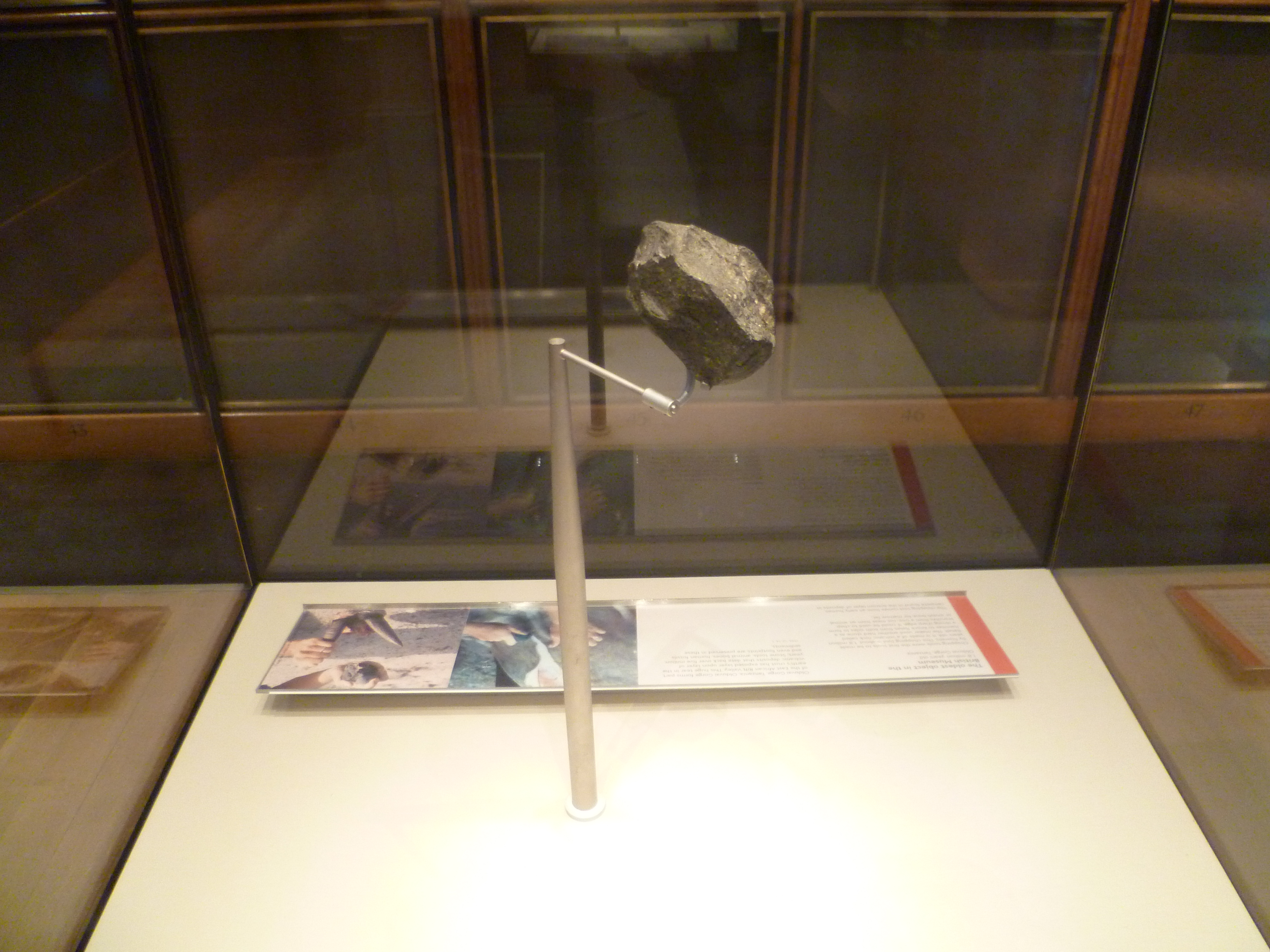
Stone chopping tool from Olduvai Gorge

According to palaeontology, early hominid skull anatomy was similar to that of their close cousins, the great African forest apes, gorilla and chimpanzee. However, they had adopted a bipedal locomotion and freed hands, giving them a crucial advantage enabling them to live in both forested areas and on the open savanna at a time when Africa was drying up, with savanna encroaching on forested areas. This occurred 10 million to 5 million years ago.

By 3 million years ago several australopithecine hominid species had developed throughout Southern, East, and Central Africa. They were tool users rather than tool manufacturers. The next major evolutionary step occurred around 2.3 million BCE, when primitive stone tools were used to scavenge the carcasses of animals killed by other predators, both for their meat and their marrow. In hunting, H. habilis was most likely not capable of competing with large predators and was more prey than hunter, although H. habilis likely did steal eggs from nests and may have been able to catch small game and weakened larger prey such as cubs and older animals. The tools were classed as Oldowan.

Roughly 1.8 million years ago, Homo ergaster first appeared in the fossil record in Africa. From Homo ergaster, Homo erectus (upright man) evolved 1.5 million years ago. Some of the earlier representatives of this species were small-brained and used primitive stone tools, much like H. habilis. The brain later grew in size, and H. erectus eventually developed a more complex stone tool technology called the Acheulean. Potentially the first hominid to engage in hunting, H. erectus mastered the art of making fire. They were the first hominids to leave Africa, going on to colonise the entire Old World, and perhaps later on giving rise to Homo floresiensis. Although some recent writers suggest that H. georgicus, a H. habilis descendant, was the first and most primitive hominid to ever live outside Africa, many scientists consider H. georgicus to be an early and primitive member of the H. erectus species.

The fossil and genetic evidence shows Homo sapiens developed in East and Southern Africa by around 350,000 to 260,000 years ago and gradually migrated across the continent in waves. Between 50,000 and 60,000 years ago, their expansion out of Africa launched the colonisation of the planet by modern humans. By 10,000 BCE, Homo sapiens had spread to all corners of the world. This dispersal of the human species is suggested by linguistic, cultural and genetic evidence.

During the 11th millennium BP, pottery was independently invented in West Africa, with the earliest pottery there dating to about 9,400 BC from central Mali. It spread throughout the Sahel and southern Sahara.

After the Sahara became a desert, it did not present a totally impenetrable barrier for travellers between north and south because of the application of animal husbandry towards carrying water, food, and supplies across the desert. Prior to the introduction of the camel, the use of oxen, mule, and horses for desert crossing was common, and trade routes followed chains of oases that were strung across the desert. The trans-saharan trade was in full motion by 500 BCE with Carthage being a major economic force for its establishment. It is thought that the camel was first brought to Egypt after the Persian Empire conquered Egypt in 525 BCE, although large herds did not become common enough in North Africa for camels to be the pack animal of choice for the trans-saharan trade.

=== West Africa ===
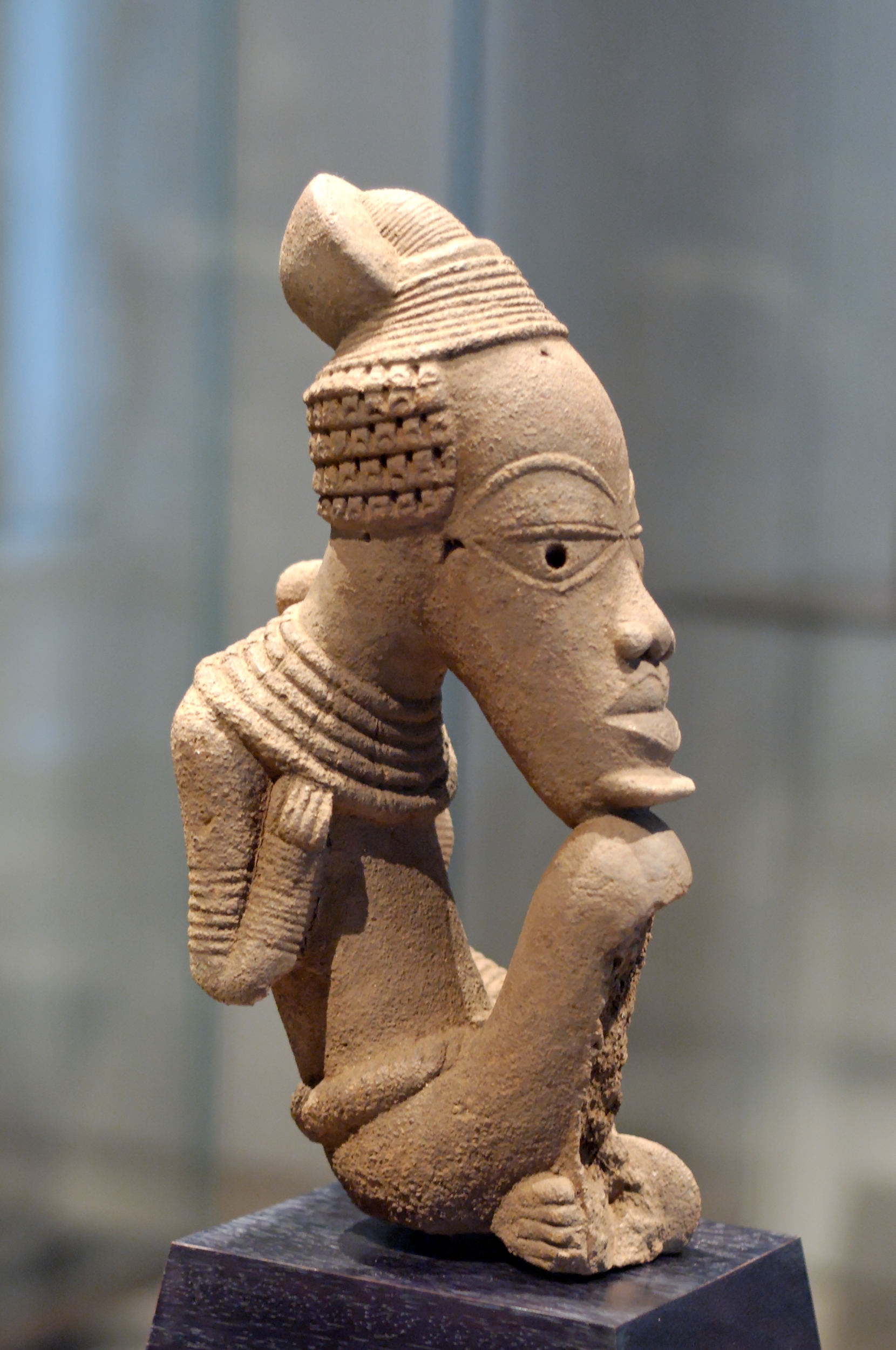
Nok sculpture, terracotta, Louvre

The Bantu expansion is a major migration movement that originated in West Central Africa (possibly around Cameroon) around 2500 BCE, reaching East and Central Africa by 1000 BCE and Southern Africa by the early centuries CE.

The Djenné-Djenno city-state flourished from 250 BCE to 900 CE and was influential to the development of the Ghana Empire. The Nok culture of Nigeria (lasting from 1,500 BCE to 200 CE) is known from a type of terracotta figure. There were a number of medieval empires of the southern Sahara and the Sahel, based on trans-Saharan trade, including the Ghana Empire and the Mali Empire, Songhai Empire, the Kanem Empire and the subsequent Bornu Empire. They built stone structures like in Tichit, but mainly constructed in adobe. The Great Mosque of Djenne is most reflective of Sahelian architecture and is the largest adobe building in the world.

In the forest zone, several states and empires such as Bono State, Akwamu and others emerged. The Ashanti Empire arose in the 18th century in modern-day Ghana. The Kingdom of Nri was established by the Igbo in the 11th century, was famous for having a priest-king who wielded no military power. Nri was a rare African state which was a haven for freed slaves and outcasts who sought refuge in their territory. Other major states included the kingdoms of Ifẹ and Oyo in the western block of Nigeria which became prominent about 700–900 and 1400 respectively, and were centres of Yoruba culture. The Yoruba built massive mud walls around their cities, the most famous being Sungbo's Eredo. Another prominent kingdom in southwestern Nigeria was the Kingdom of Benin, whose power lasted between the 15th and 19th century. Their dominance reached as far as the well-known city of Eko which was named Lagos by the Portuguese traders and other early European settlers. The Edo-speaking people of Benin are known for their famous bronze casting and rich coral, wealth, ancient science and technology and the Walls of Benin, one of the longest man-made structures on the world.

In the 18th century, the Oyo and the Aro Confederacy were responsible for most of the slaves exported from modern-day Nigeria, selling them to European slave traders. Following the Napoleonic Wars, the British expanded their influence into the Nigerian interior. In 1885, British claims to a West African sphere of influence received international recognition, and in the following year the Royal Niger Company was chartered under the leadership of Sir George Goldie. In 1900, the company's territory came under the control of the British government, which moved to consolidate its hold over the area of modern Nigeria. On 1 January 1901, Nigeria became a British protectorate as part of the British Empire, the foremost world power at the time. Nigeria was granted its independence in 1960 during the period of decolonization.

=== Central Africa ===
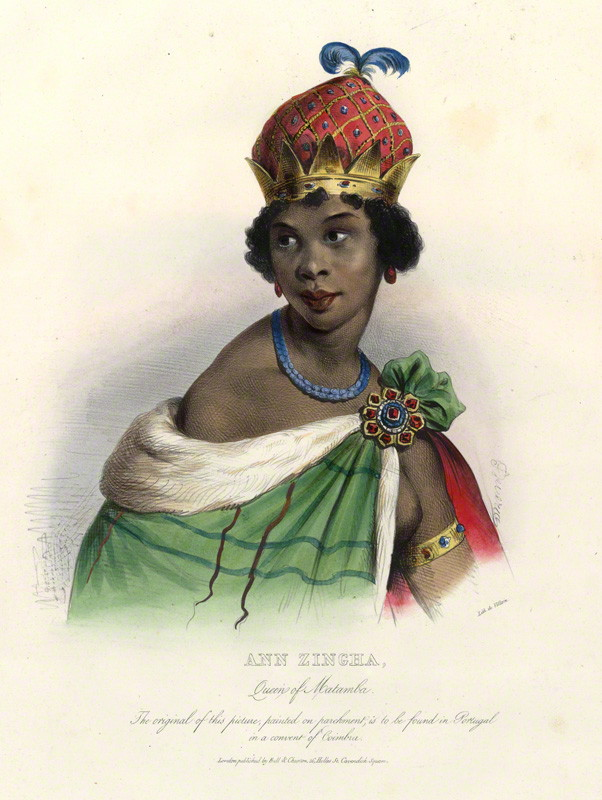
Fictionalised portrait of Nzinga, queen of the Ndongo and Matamba kingdoms

Archeological finds in Central Africa provide evidence of human settlement that may date back over 10,000 years. According to Zangato and Holl, there is evidence of iron-smelting in the Central African Republic and Cameroon that may date back to 3,000 to 2,500 BCE. Extensive walled sites and settlements have recently been found in Zilum, Chad. The area is located approximately 60 km (37 mi) southwest of Lake Chad, and has been radiocarbon dated to the first millennium BCE.

Trade and improved agricultural techniques supported more sophisticated societies, leading to the early civilisations of Sao, Kanem, Bornu, Shilluk, Baguirmi, and Wadai.

Following the Bantu Migration into Central Africa, during the 14th century, the Luba Kingdom in southeast Congo came about under a king whose political authority derived from religious, spiritual legitimacy. The kingdom controlled agriculture and regional trade of salt and iron from the north and copper from the Zambian/Congo copper belt.

Rival kingship factions which split from the Luba Kingdom later moved among the Lunda people, marrying into its elite and laying the foundation of the Lunda Empire in the 16th century. The ruling dynasty centralised authority among the Lunda under the Mwata Yamyo or Mwaant Yaav. The Mwata Yamyo's legitimacy, like that of the Luba king, came from being viewed as a spiritual religious guardian. This imperial cult or system of divine kings was spread to most of central Africa by rivals in kingship migrating and forming new states. Many new states received legitimacy by claiming descent from the Lunda dynasties.

The Kingdom of Kongo existed from the Atlantic west to the Kwango river to the east. During the 15th century, the Bakongo farming community was united with its capital at M'banza-Kongo, under the king title, Manikongo. Other significant states and peoples included the Kuba Kingdom, producers of the famous raffia cloth, the Eastern Lunda, Bemba, Burundi, Rwanda, and the Kingdom of Ndongo.

=== East Africa ===
==== Sudan ====
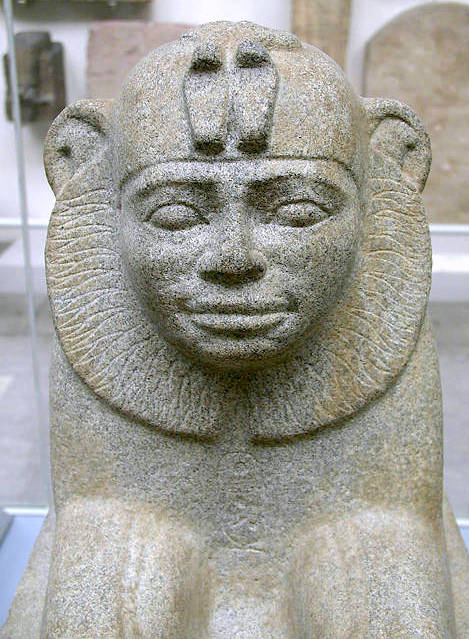
Sphinx of the Nubian Emperor Taharqa

Nubia, covered by present-day northern Sudan and southern Egypt, was referred to as "Aethiopia" ("land of the burnt face") by the Greeks. Nubia in her greatest phase is considered sub-Saharan Africa's oldest urban civilisation. Nubia was a major source of gold for the ancient world. Nubians built famous structures and numerous pyramids. Sudan, the site of ancient Nubia, has more pyramids than anywhere else in the world.

==== Horn of Africa ====
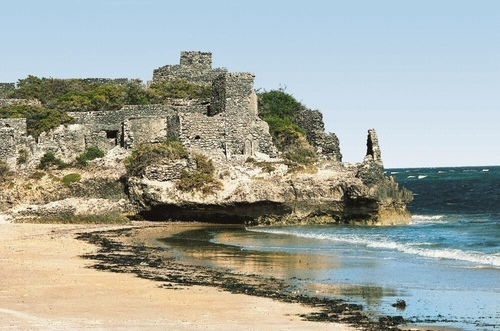
Stone city of Gondershe, Somalia

The Axumite Empire spanned the southern Sahara, south Arabia and the Sahel along the western shore of the Red Sea. Located in northern Ethiopia and Eritrea, Aksum was deeply involved in the trade network between India and the Mediterranean. Growing from the proto-Aksumite Iron Age period (c. 4th century BCE), it rose to prominence by the 1st century CE. The Aksumites constructed monolithic stelae to cover the graves of their kings, such as King Ezana's Stele. The later Zagwe dynasty, established in the 12th century, built churches out of solid rock. These rock-hewn structures include the Church of St. George at Lalibela.

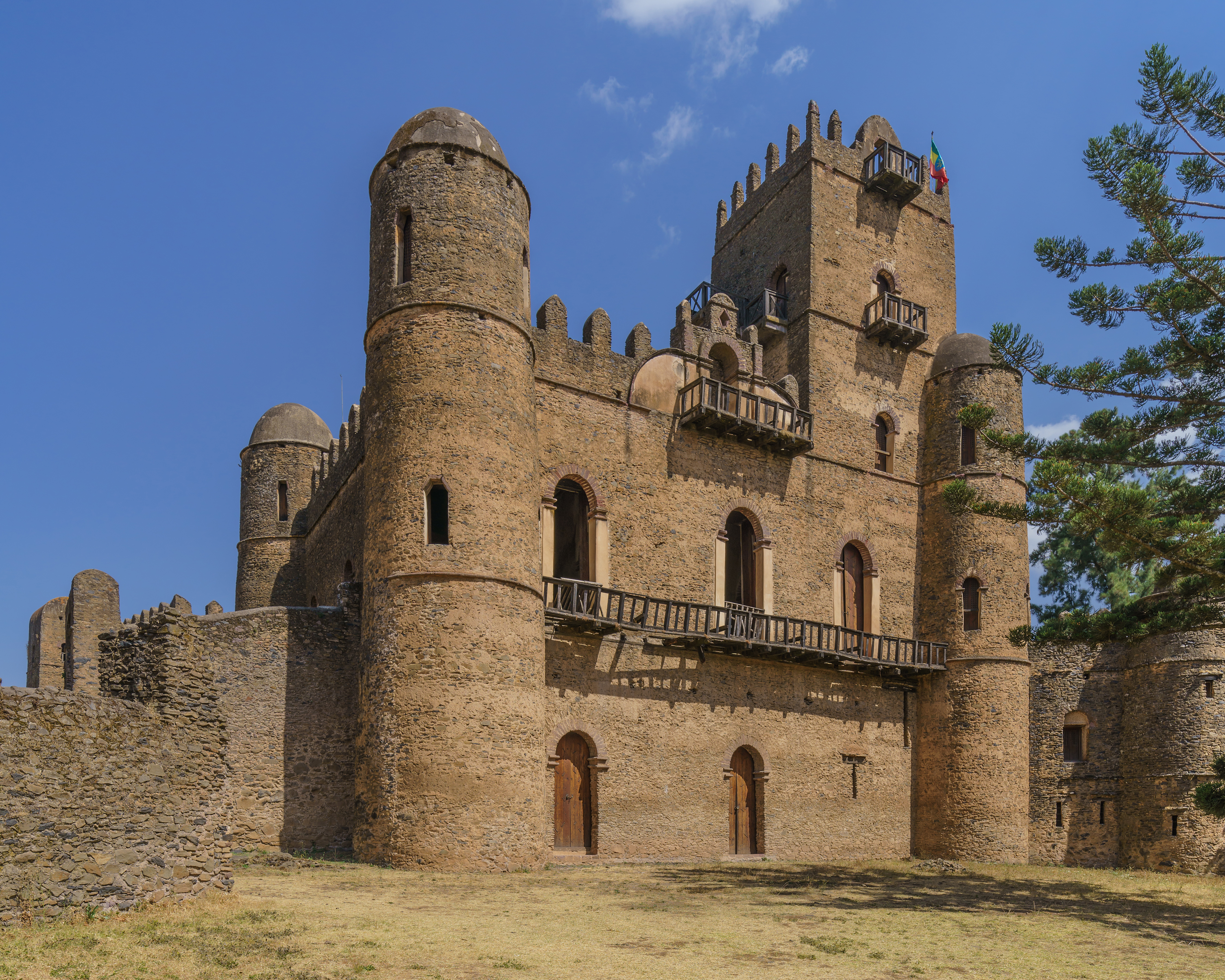
Fasilides Castle, Ethiopia

In ancient Somalia, city-states flourished such as Opone, Mosyllon and Malao that competed with the Sabaeans, Parthians and Axumites for the wealthy Indo–Greco–Roman trade.

In the Middle Ages several powerful Somali empires dominated the region's trade, including the Ajuran Sultanate, which excelled in hydraulic engineering and fortress building, the Sultanate of Adal, whose General Ahmed Gurey was the first African commander in history to use cannon warfare on the continent during Adal's conquest of the Ethiopian Empire, and the Geledi Sultanate, whose military dominance forced governors of the Omani empire north of the city of Lamu to pay tribute to the Somali Sultan Ahmed Yusuf.

==== Southeast Africa ====
According to the theory of recent African origin of modern humans, the mainstream position held within the scientific community, all humans originate from either Southeast Africa or the Horn of Africa. During the first millennium CE, Nilotic and Bantu-speaking peoples moved into the region, and the latter now account for three-quarters of Kenya's population.

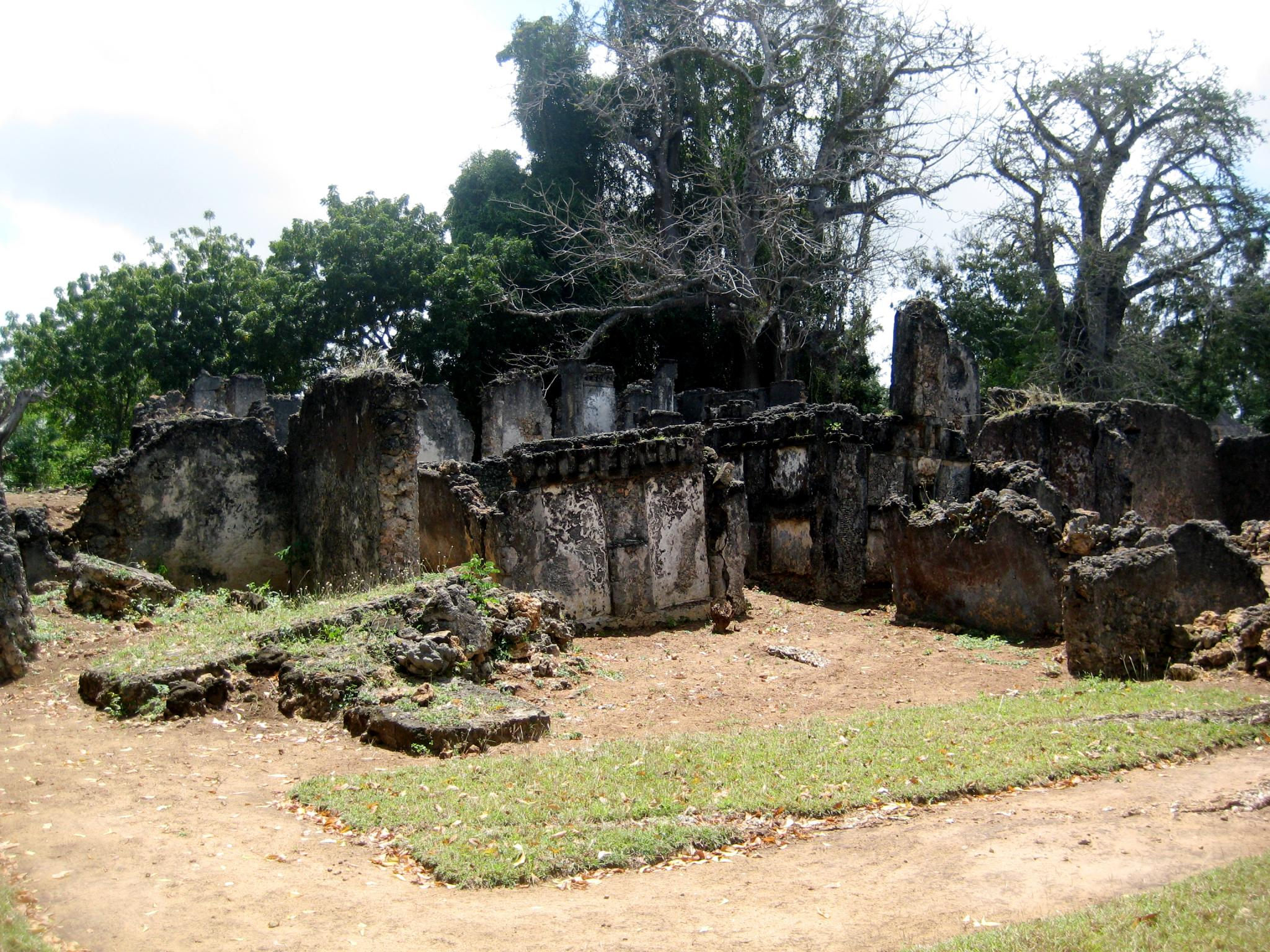
The Tongoni Ruins south of Tanga in Tanzania

On the coastal section of Southeast Africa, a mixed Bantu community developed through contact with Muslim Arab and Persian traders, leading to the development of the mixed Arab, Persian and African Swahili City States. The Swahili culture that emerged from these exchanges evinces many Arab and Islamic influences not seen in traditional Bantu culture, as do the many Afro-Arab members of the Bantu Swahili people. With its original speech community centered on the coastal parts of Tanzania (particularly Zanzibar) and Kenya – a seaboard referred to as the Swahili Coast – the Bantu Swahili language contains many Arabic loan-words as a consequence of these interactions.

The earliest Bantu inhabitants of the Southeast coast of Kenya and Tanzania encountered by these later Arab and Persian settlers have been variously identified with the trading settlements of Rhapta, Azania and Menouthias referenced in early Greek and Chinese writings from 50 CE to 500 CE. These early writings perhaps document the first wave of Bantu settlers to reach Southeast Africa during their migration.

Between the 14th and 15th centuries, large medieval Southeast African kingdoms and states emerged, such as the Buganda, Bunyoro and Karagwe kingdoms of Uganda and Tanzania.

During the early 1960s, the Southeast African nations achieved independence from colonial rule.

=== Southern Africa ===
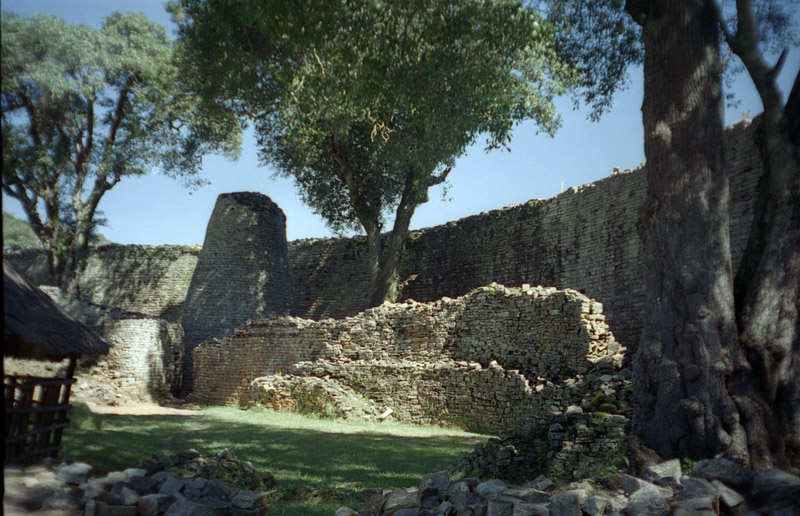
Great Zimbabwe: Tower in the Great Enclosure

Settlements of Bantu-speaking peoples, who were iron-using agriculturists and herdsmen, were already present south of the Limpopo River by the 4th or 5th century displacing and absorbing the original Khoisan speakers. They slowly moved south, and the earliest ironworks in modern-day KwaZulu-Natal Province are believed to date from around 1050. The southernmost group was the Xhosa people, whose language incorporates certain linguistic traits from the earlier Khoisan inhabitants. They reached the Fish River in today's Eastern Cape Province. Monomotapa was a medieval kingdom (c. 1250–1629), which existed between the Zambezi and Limpopo rivers of Southern Africa in the territory of modern-day Zimbabwe and Mozambique. Its old capital was located at Great Zimbabwe.

In 1487, Bartolomeu Dias became the first European to reach the southernmost tip of Africa. In 1652, a victualling station was established at the Cape of Good Hope by Jan van Riebeeck on behalf of the Dutch East India Company. For most of the 17th and 18th centuries, the slowly expanding settlement was a Dutch possession. In 1795, the Dutch colony was captured by the British during the French Revolutionary Wars. The British intended to use Cape Town as a major port on the route to Australia and India. It was later returned to the Dutch in 1803, but soon afterward the Dutch East India Company declared bankruptcy, and the Dutch (now under French control) and the British found themselves at war again. The British captured the Dutch possession yet again at the Battle of Blaauwberg, commanded by Sir David Blair. The Zulu Kingdom was a Southern African tribal state in what is now KwaZulu-Natal in southeastern South Africa. The small kingdom gained world fame during and after their defeat in the Anglo-Zulu War. During the 1950s and early 1960s, most sub-Saharan African nations achieved independence from colonial rule.

== Geography ==
=== Climate zones and ecoregions ===
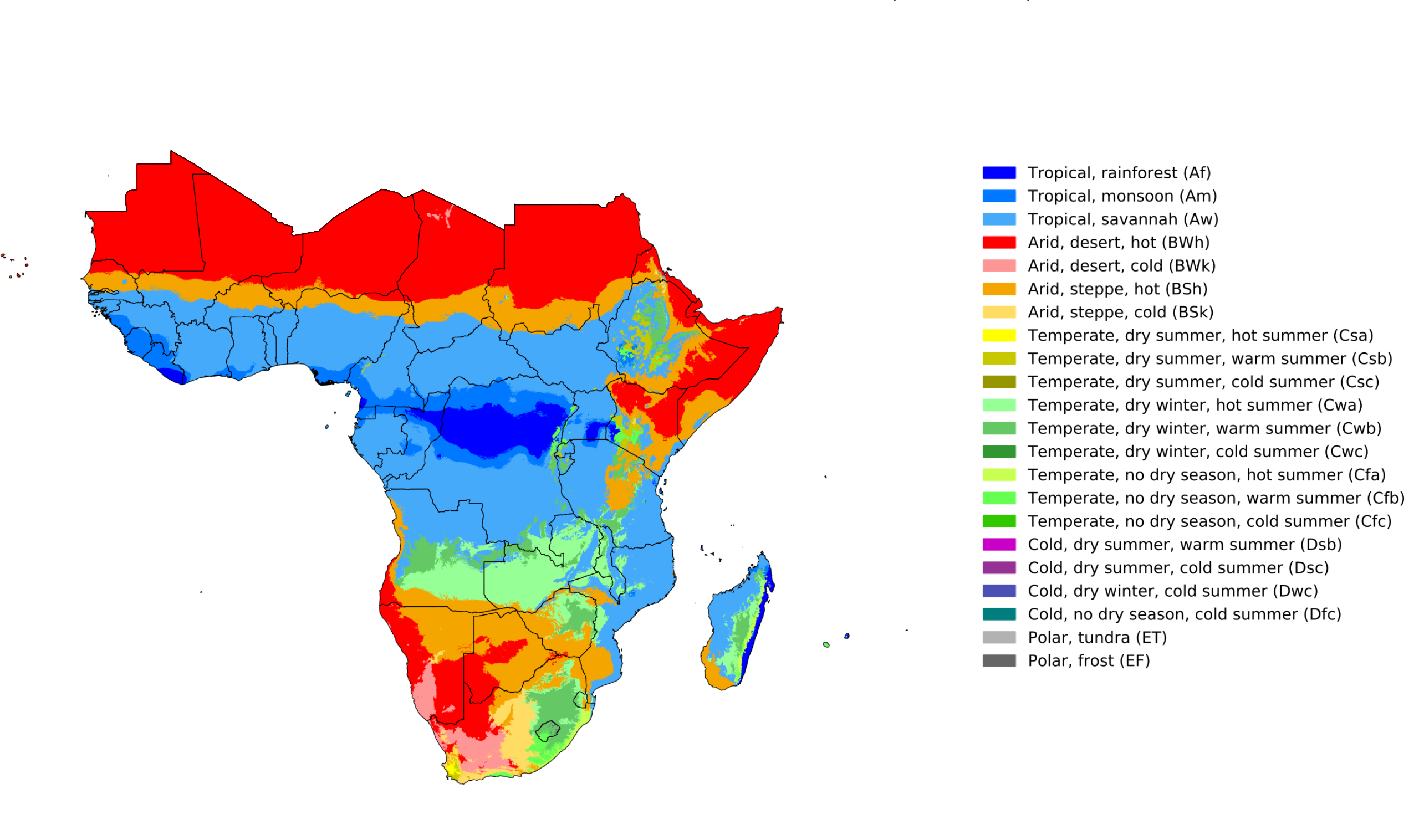
Climate zones of Africa, showing the ecological break between the hot desert climate of North Africa and the Horn of Africa (red), the hot semi-arid climate of the Sahel and areas surrounding semi-deserts (orange) and the tropical climate of Central and West Africa (blue). Southern Africa has a transition to subtropical or temperate climates (green and yellow), and more desert or semi-desert regions, centered on Namibia and Botswana.

Sub-Saharan Africa has a wide variety of climate zones or biomes. South Africa and the Democratic Republic of the Congo in particular are considered megadiverse countries. It has a dry winter season and a wet summer season.

- The Sahel extends across all of Africa at a latitude of about 10° to 15° N. Countries that include parts of the Sahara Desert proper in their northern territories and parts of the Sahel in their southern region include Mauritania, Mali, Niger, Chad, and Sudan. The Sahel has a hot semi-arid climate.
- South of the Sahel, a belt of savanna (the West and East Sudanian savannas) stretch from the Atlantic Ocean to the Ethiopian Highlands. The more humid Guinean and Northern Congolian forest–savanna mosaic lie between the savannas and the equatorial forests.
- The Horn of Africa includes hot desert climate along the coast but a hot semi-arid climate can be found much more in the interior, contrasting with savanna and moist broadleaf forests in the Ethiopian Highlands.
- Tropical Africa encompasses tropical rainforest stretching along the southern coast of West Africa and across most of Central Africa (the DR Congo) west of the African Great Lakes.
- In East Africa, woodlands, savannas, and grasslands are found in the equatorial zone, including the Serengeti ecosystem in Tanzania and Kenya.
- Distinctive Afromontane forests, grasslands, and shrublands are found in the high mountains and mountain ranges of eastern Africa, from the Ethiopian Highlands to South Africa.
- South of the equatorial forests, the Western and Southern Congolian forest–savanna mosaic are transition zones between the tropical forests and the miombo woodland belt that spans the continent from Angola to Mozambique and Tanzania.
- The Namib and Kalahari Deserts lie in Southern Africa, and are surrounded by semi-deserts including the Karoo region of South Africa. The Bushveld grasslands lie to the east of the deserts.
- The Cape Floristic Region is at Africa's southern tip, and is home to diverse subtropical and temperate forests, woodlands, grasslands, and shrublands.

== Economy ==
In the mid-2010s, private capital flew to sub-Saharan Africa – primarily from members of BRICS, private-sector investment portfolios, and remittances – began to exceed official development assistance.

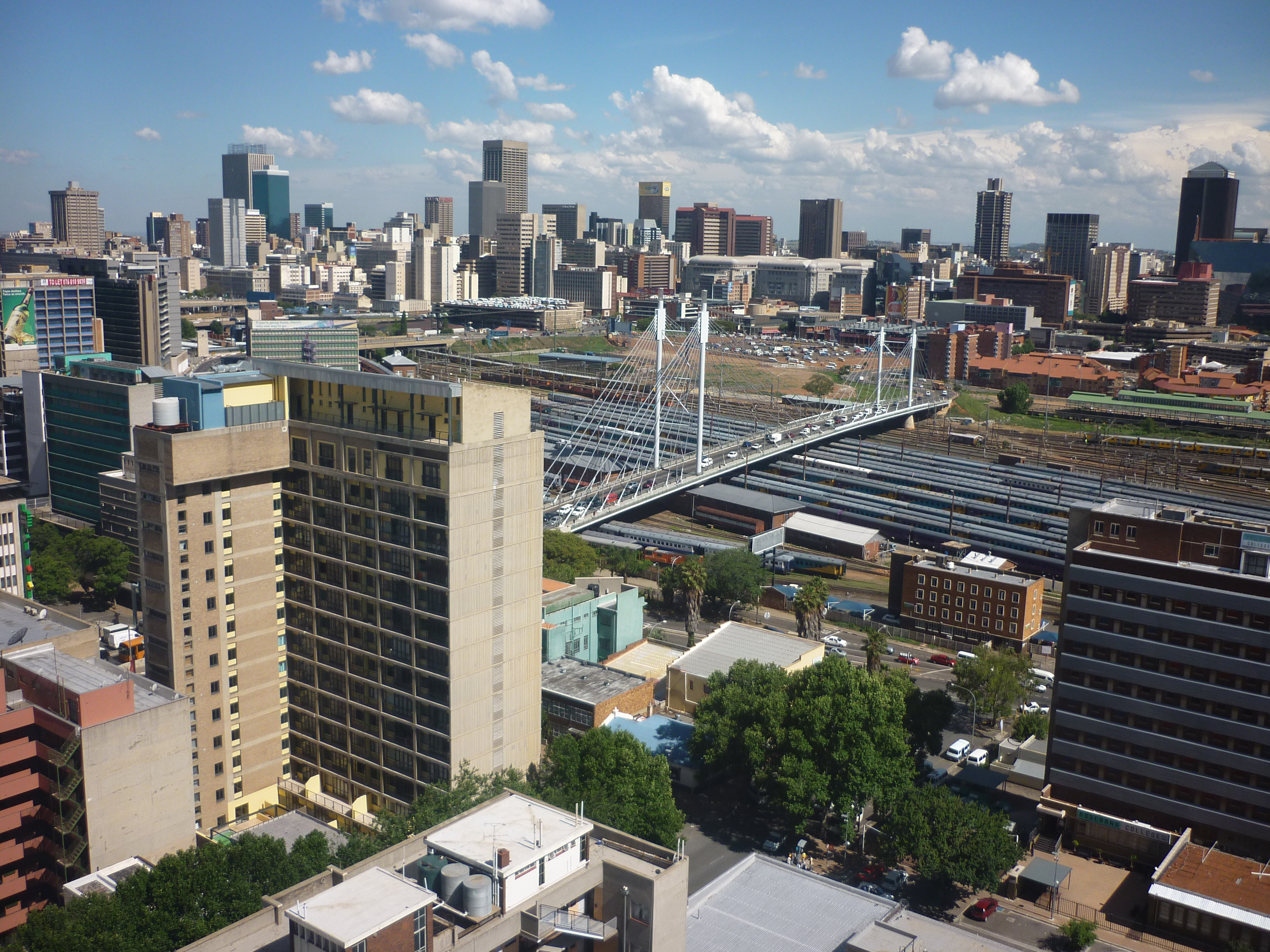
Johannesburg

As of 2011, Africa is one of the fastest developing regions in the world. Six of the world's ten fastest-growing economies over the previous decade were situated below the Sahara, with the remaining four in East and Central Asia. According to the World Bank, the economic growth rate in the region had risen to 4.7% in 2013. This continued rise was attributed to increasing investment in infrastructure and resources as well as steady expenditure per household.

In 2019, 424 million people in sub-Saharan Africa were reportedly living in severe poverty. In 2022, 460 million people—an increase of 36 million in only three years—were anticipated to be living in extreme poverty as a result of the COVID-19 pandemic and the Russian invasion of Ukraine. Sub-Saharan Africa's government debt rose from 28% of gross domestic product in 2012 to 50% of gross domestic product in 2019. The COVID-19 pandemic caused it to rise to 57% of gross domestic product in 2021.

Sub-Saharan Africa was severely harmed when government revenue declined from 22% of GDP in 2011 to 17% in 2021. 15 African nations were (or are) at significant risk of debt, and 7 were (2021) in financial crisis according to the IMF. The region went on to receive IMF Special Drawing Rights of $23 billion in 2021 to assist critical public spending.

=== Energy and power ===
Oil production by country (with other key actors of African or oil economy)
Rank	Country	Barrels/day	Year	Comparable to...
01	Eu: Russia	9,980,000	2007 est.	
02	Ar: Saudi Arabia	9,200,000	2008 est.	
04	Af: Libya	4,725,000	2008 est.	Iran
10	Af: Nigeria	2,352,000	2011 est.	Norway
15	Af: Algeria	2,173,000	2007 est.	
16	Af: Angola	1,910,000	2008 est.	
17	Af: Egypt	1,845,000	2007 est.	
27	Af: Tunisia	664,000	2007 est.	Australia
31	Af: Sudan	466,100	2007 est.	Ecuador
33	Af: Eq. Guinea	368,500	2007 est.	Vietnam
38	Af: DR Congo	261,000	2008 est.	
39	Af: Gabon	243,900	2007 est.	
40	Af: South Africa	199,100	2007 est.	
45	Af: Chad	156,000	2008 est.	Germany
53	Af: Cameroon	87,400	2008 est.	France
56	Eu: France	71,400	2007	
60	Af: Ivory Coast	54,400	2008 est.	
_	Africa (total)	10,780,400	2011	Russia
_	World (total)	85,540,000	2007 est.	
Source: CIA.gov, World Fact Book.

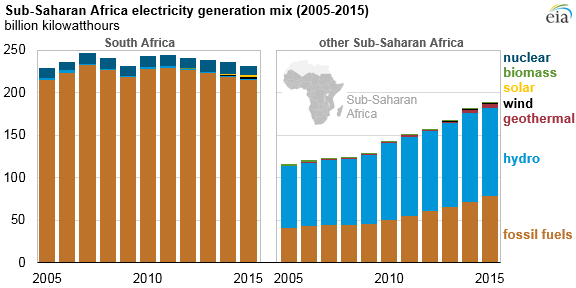
Energy sources in sub-Saharan Africa. Fossil fuels and hydroelectric power make up the largest share of sub-Saharan African electricity.

As of 2009, 50% of Africa was rural with no access to electricity. In 2021, Africa generated 889 TWh of electricity, amounting to 3.13% of the global market share. Many countries were (as of 2009) affected by power shortages.

The percentage of residences with access to electricity in sub-Saharan Africa is the lowest in the world. In some remote regions, fewer than one in every 20 households has electricity.

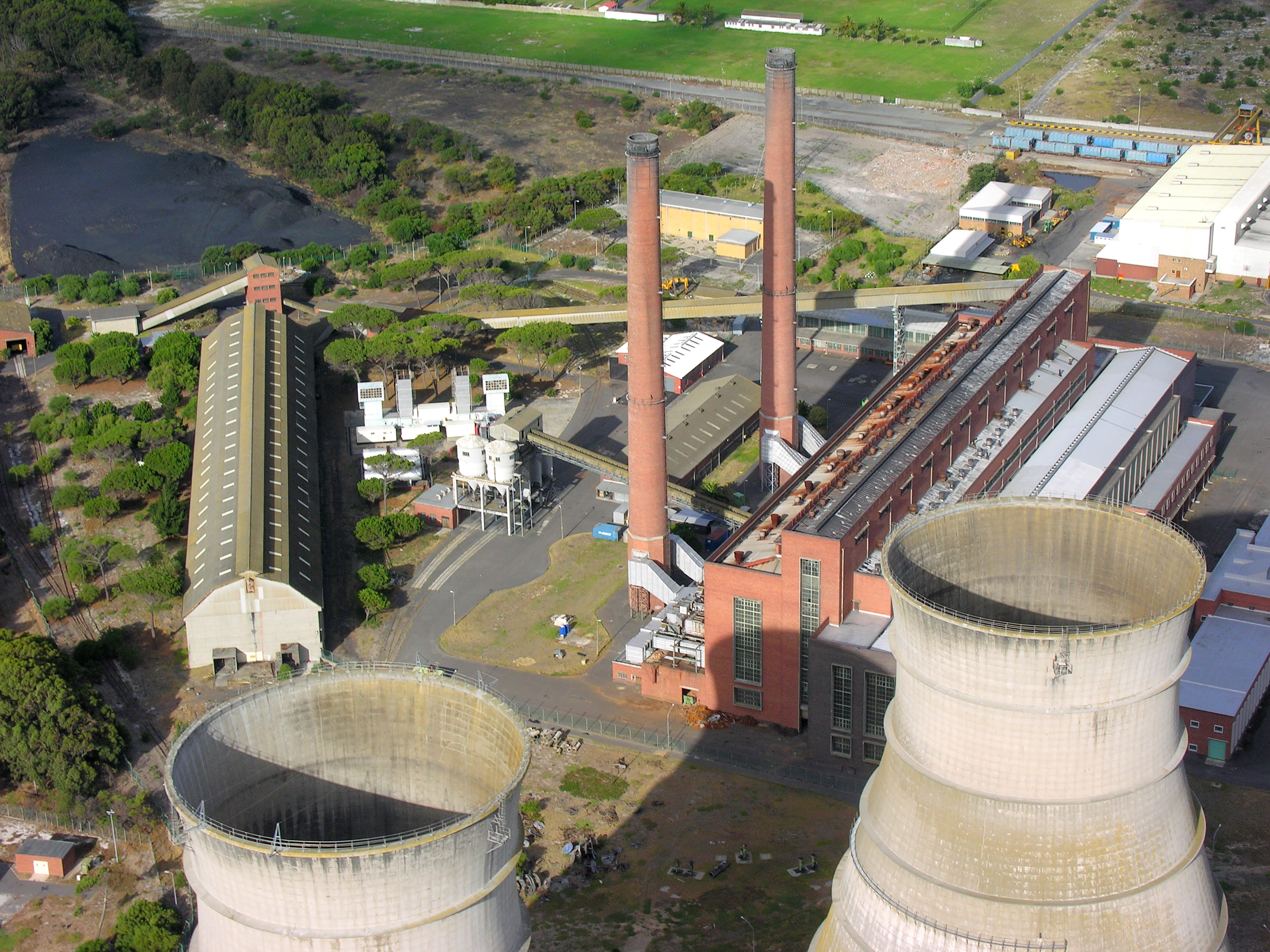
The Athlone Power Station in Cape Town, South Africa

Because of rising prices in commodities such as coal and oil, thermal sources of energy are proving to be too expensive for power generation. Sub-Saharan Africa has the potential to generate 1,750 TWh of energy, of which only 7% has been explored. The failure to exploit its full energy potential is largely due to significant underinvestment, as at least four times as much (approximately $23 billion a year) and what is currently spent is invested in operating high cost power systems and not on expanding the infrastructure.

African governments are taking advantage of the readily available water resources to broaden their energy mix. Hydro Turbine Markets in sub-Saharan Africa generated revenues of $120.0 million in 2007 and was estimated to reach $425.0 million. Asian countries, notably China, India, and Japan, are playing an active role in power projects across the African continent. The majority of these power projects are hydro-based because of China's vast experience in the construction of hydro-power projects and part of the Energy & Power Growth Partnership Services programme.

With electrification numbers, sub-Saharan Africa with access to the Sahara and being in the tropical zones has massive potential for solar photovoltaic electrical potential. Six hundred million people could be served with electricity based on its photovoltaic potential. In 2003, China promised to train 10,000 technicians from Africa and other developing countries in the use of solar energy technologies over the next five years. Training African technicians to use solar power is part of the China-Africa science and technology cooperation agreement signed by Chinese science minister Xu Guanhua and African counterparts during premier Wen Jiabao's visit to Ethiopia in December 2003.

The New Partnership for Africa's Development (NEPAD) is developing an integrated, continent-wide energy strategy. This has been funded by, amongst others, the African Development Bank (AfDB) and the EU-Africa Infrastructure Trust Fund. These projects must be sustainable, involve a cross-border dimension and/or have a regional impact, involve public and private capital, contribute to poverty alleviation and economic development, and involve at least one country in sub-Saharan Africa.

Renewable Energy Performance Platform was established by the European Investment Bank and the United Nations Environment Programme with a five-year goal of improving energy access for at least two million people in sub-Saharan Africa. It has so far invested around $45 million to renewable energy projects in 13 countries in sub-Saharan Africa. Solar power and hydropower are among the energy methods used in the projects.

=== Oil and minerals ===
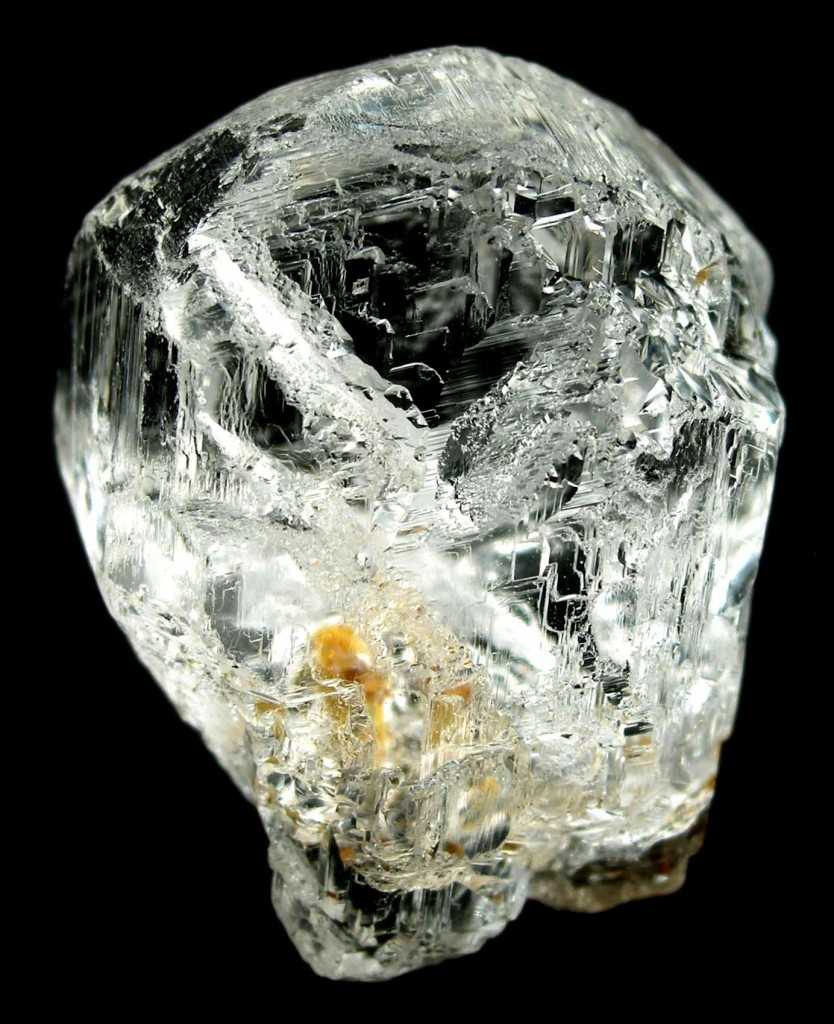
Phenakite from the Jos Plateau, Plateau State, Nigeria.

The region is a major exporter to the world of gold, uranium, chromium, vanadium, antimony, coltan, bauxite, iron ore, copper, and manganese. South Africa, along with Gabon and Ghana, collectively supplies over 60% of global manganese, and is also a major exporter of chromium. A 2001 estimate is that 42% of the world's reserves of chromium may be found in South Africa. South Africa is the largest producer of platinum, with 80% of the total world's annual mine production and 88% of the world's platinum reserve. Sub-Saharan Africa produces 33% of the world's bauxite, with Guinea as the major supplier. Zambia is a major producer of copper. The Democratic Republic of the Congo is a major source of coltan. Production from DR Congo is very small, but the country has 80% of the proven reserves in Africa, which are 80% of those worldwide. Sub-Saharan Africa is a major producer of gold, producing up to 30% of global production. Major suppliers are South Africa, Ghana, Zimbabwe, Tanzania, Guinea, and Mali. South Africa had been first in the world in terms of gold production since 1905, but in 2007 it moved to second place, according to GFMS, the precious metals consultancy. Uranium is major commodity from the region. Significant suppliers are Niger, Namibia, and South Africa. Namibia was the number one supplier from sub-Saharan Africa in 2008. The region produces 49% of the world's diamonds.

Sub-Saharan Africa has been the focus of an intense race for oil by the West, China, India, and other emerging economies, even though it holds only 10% of proven oil reserves, less than the Middle East. This race has been referred to as the second Scramble for Africa. All reasons for this global scramble come from the reserves' economic benefits. Transportation cost is low and no pipelines have to be laid as in Central Asia. Almost all reserves are offshore, so political turmoil within the host country will not directly interfere with operations. Sub-Saharan oil is viscous, with a very low sulfur content. This quickens the refining process and effectively reduces costs. New sources of oil are being located in sub-Saharan Africa more frequently than anywhere else. Of all new sources of oil, 1/3 are in sub-Saharan Africa.

Sub-Saharan Africa is a key player in the global minerals market, producing over 70% of the world's cobalt and hosting about 50% of its reserves in the Democratic Republic of the Congo (DRC). The region also harbors significant lithium deposits in Zimbabwe, DR Congo, and Mali.

=== Agriculture ===
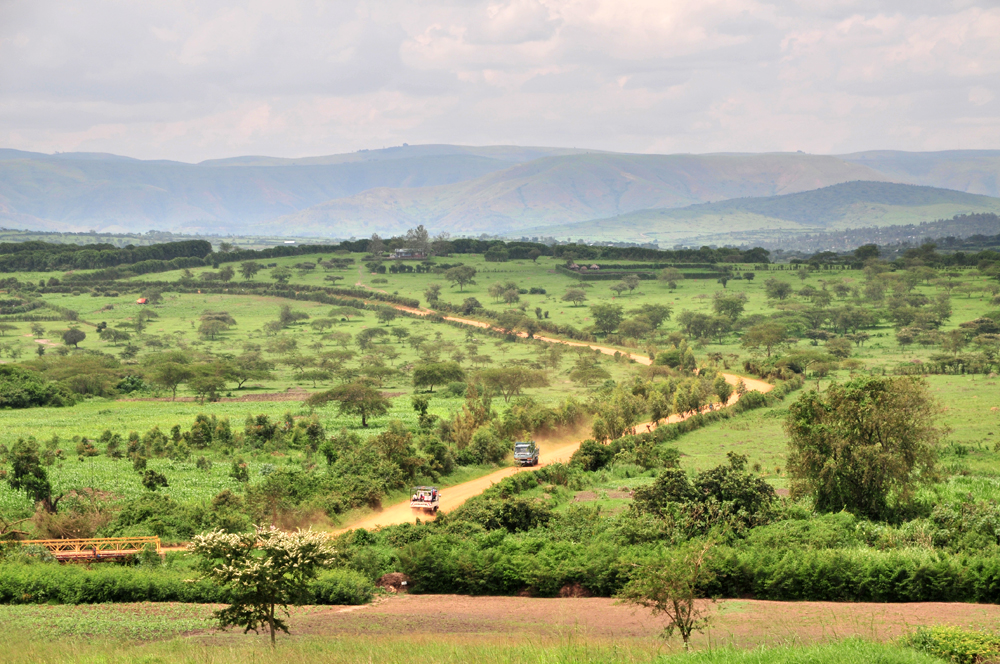
Agricultural fields in Rwanda's Eastern Province

Sub-Saharan Africa has more variety of grains than anywhere in the world. Between 13,000 and 11,000 BCE wild grains began to be collected as a source of food in the cataract region of the Nile, south of Egypt. The collecting of wild grains as source of food spread to Syria, parts of Turkey, and Iran by the eleventh millennium BCE. By the tenth and ninth millennia southwest Asians domesticated their wild grains, wheat, and barley after the notion of collecting wild grains spread from the Nile.

Numerous crops have been domesticated in the region and spread to other parts of the world. These crops included sorghum, castor beans, coffee, cotton, okra, black-eyed peas, watermelon, gourd, and pearl millet. Other domesticated crops included teff, enset, African rice, yams, kola nuts, oil palm, and raffia palm.

Domesticated animals include the guinea fowl and the donkey.

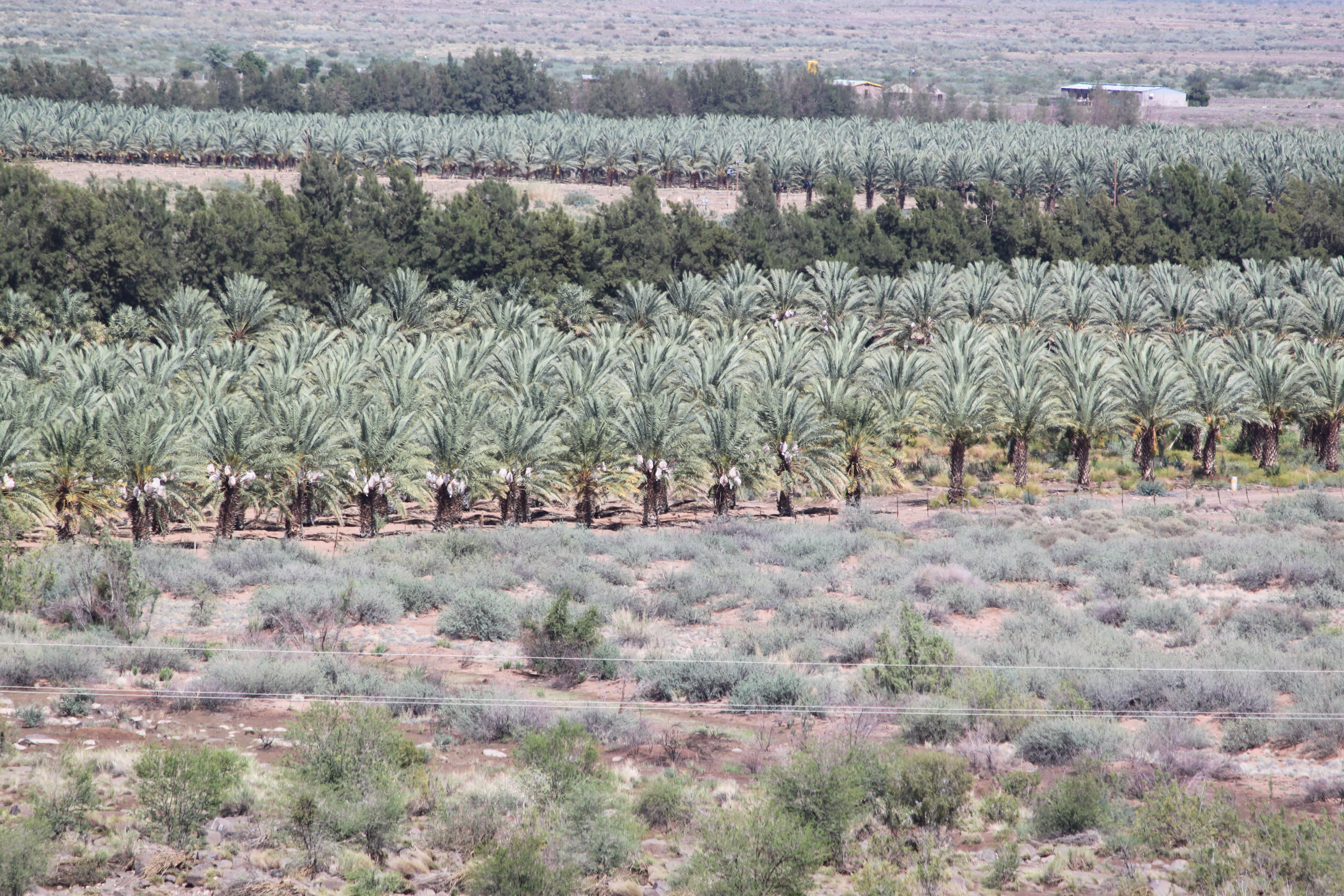
The Naute Fruit Farm at the Naute Dam outside of Keetmanshoop, Namibia

Agriculture represents 20% to 30% of GDP and 50% of exports. In some cases, 60% to 90% of the labor force are employed in agriculture. Most agricultural activity is subsistence farming. This has made agricultural activity vulnerable to climate change and global warming. As of right now Sub-Saharan Africa has degraded land covering one million square kilometres. Biotechnology has been advocated to create high yield, pest and environmentally resistant crops in the hands of small farmers. The Bill and Melinda Gates Foundation is a strong advocate and donor to this cause. Biotechnology and GM crops have met resistance both by natives and environmental groups.

Cash crops include cotton, coffee, tea, cocoa, sugar, and tobacco.

The OECD says Africa has the potential to become an agricultural superbloc if it can unlock the wealth of the savannahs by allowing farmers to use their land as collateral for credit. There is such international interest in sub-Saharan agriculture, that the World Bank increased its financing of African agricultural programs to $1.3 billion in the 2011 fiscal year. Recently, there has been a trend to purchase large tracts of land in sub-Sahara for agricultural use by developing countries. Early in 2009, George Soros highlighted a new farmland buying frenzy caused by growing population, scarce water supplies and climate change. Chinese interests bought up large swathes of Senegal to supply it with sesame. Aggressive moves by China, South Korea, and Gulf states to buy vast tracts of agricultural land in sub-Saharan Africa could soon be limited by a new global international protocol.

=== Low productivity of subsistance farmers ===
Compared to South America and Asia, Sub-Saharan Africa has experienced persistently low crop yield productivity for more than 50 years. As mentioned above, one factor influencing low productivity might be low access to credit studies. Many studies have focused on factors such as access to credit, and time preferences as key explanations for low productivity of small farmers in Sub-Saharan Africa. However, recent studies have explored an alternative mechanism: quality of agricultural inputs. Indeed, usage of high-quality inputs, such as seeds and fertiliser, would substantially increase productivity of subsistance farmers. However, there is a small take up rate of this product by farmers, despite acknowledging their benefits.

==== Structure of the agricultural market ====
First, it is important to explain the structure of the agricultural input market in countries of the Sub-Saharan Africa. The majority of seeds and fertilizers are traded informally, often of uncertain quality, either exchanged between farmers or reused from previous harvests, in the case of seeds. Only a small number of farmers purchase inputs from the formal market, which is generally considered to offer higher-quality products. We can illustrate this with the example of the Nigerian stem market. Indeed, only 1% of the stems sold in the Nigerian market are certified, while the remaining 99% are traded informally—either as recycled stems from local varieties or as uncertified stems derived from previously improved varieties.

==== Uncertainty about quality of agricultural inputs ====
Recent studies explain that farmers mistrust the quality of fertilisers and seeds sold in the formal market. The study realized in Uganda infers quality across fertilizer and hybrid seeds varies significantly due to adulteration: sellers tend to mix the fertilizer with poor soil. However, one study realized in Tanzania finds no adulteration in agricultural inputs, but do find that visual appearance of input sold in the formal market is degraded. Whether one study or the other is correct, both papers highlight uncertainty about fertilizer's quality, thus generating mistrust among farmers and consequently generates a low take-up rate.

Another factor highlighting uncertainty about quality is the presence of relatively homogenous pricing among different quality of the same inputs. While in most markets price is a good indicator of quality. the higher the quality, the higher the price- , in this case, uniform pricing prevents farmers from using price as a signal of input quality. Consequently, the inability of farmers to infer the quality, either through physical appearance or price, creates asymmetric information in the market, leading an inefficient market.

Some papers have tried to understand why sellers do not simply charge higher prices when they offer high-quality seeds and fertilizers, using a Bayesian learning model. It is challenging for a company to sell high-quality inputs at a premium price and build a reputation in the long term, meaning that farmers will trust the seller regarding the quality of its products. Indeed, as farmers are highly suspicious -due to fear of being scammed- their willingness to pay for high-quality products is very low. So even if the firm sells high-quality products, it will take too long for farmers to start trusting the firm, and for the seller to become profitable.

==== Policy recommendation ====
The literature advises to actually improve farmers perception of true quality itself, and not to improve the quality of the products which already meet the standards. This can be done by providing more information about inputs quality, how they should look like, where they come from, making firms more reliable. That would allow more companies to enter the market and sell formally higher inputs, instead of farmers using their own seed or using seed of unknown quality bought in informal markets.

=== Tourism ===
The development of tourism in this region has been identified as having the ability to create jobs and improve the economy. South Africa, Namibia, Mauritius, Botswana, Ghana, Cape Verde, Tanzania and Kenya have been identified as having well developed tourism industries. Cape Town and the surrounding area is very popular with tourists.

=== Infrastructure ===
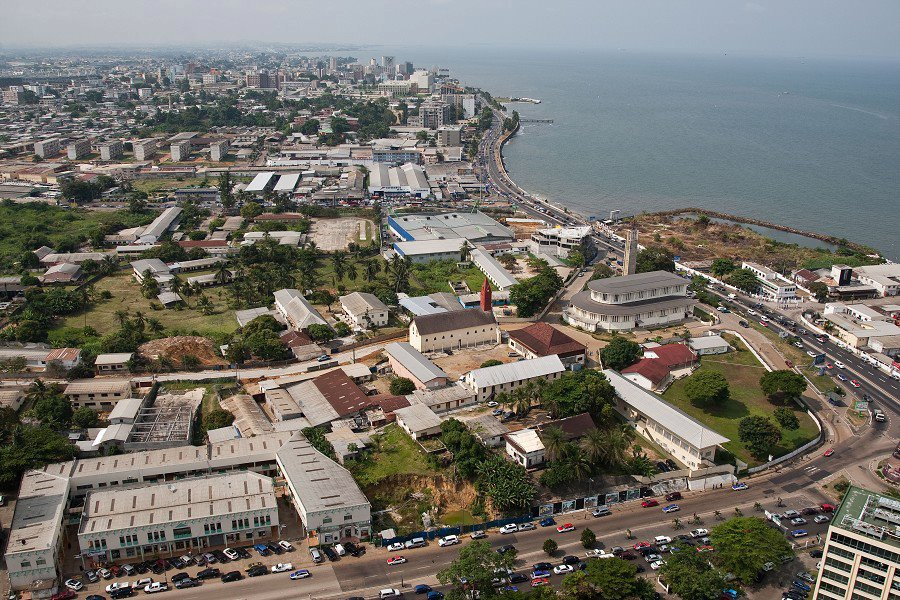
Skyline of Libreville, Gabon

According to researchers at the Overseas Development Institute, the lack of infrastructure in many developing countries represents one of the most significant limitations to economic growth and achievement of the Millennium Development Goals (MDGs). Infrastructure investments and maintenance can be very expensive, especially in such as areas as landlocked, rural and sparsely populated countries in Africa.

Infrastructure investments contributed to Africa's growth, and increased investment is necessary to maintain growth and tackle poverty. The returns to investment in infrastructure are very significant, with on average 30–40% returns for telecommunications (ICT) investments, over 40% for electricity generation and 80% for roads.

In Africa, it is argued that in order to meet the MDGs, infrastructure investments would need to reach about 15% of GDP (around $93 billion a year). Currently, the source of financing varies significantly across sectors. Some sectors are dominated by state spending, others by overseas development aid (ODA) and yet others by private investors. In sub-Saharan Africa, the state spends around $9.4 billion out of a total of $24.9 billion. In irrigation, SSA states represent almost all spending; in transport and energy a majority of investment is state spending; in ICT and water supply and sanitation, the private sector represents the majority of capital expenditure. Overall, aid, the private sector and non-OECD financiers between them exceed state spending. The private sector spending alone equals state capital expenditure, though the majority is focused on ICT infrastructure investments. External financing increased from $7 billion (2002) to $27 billion (2009). China, in particular, has emerged as an important investor.

==== Transport ====
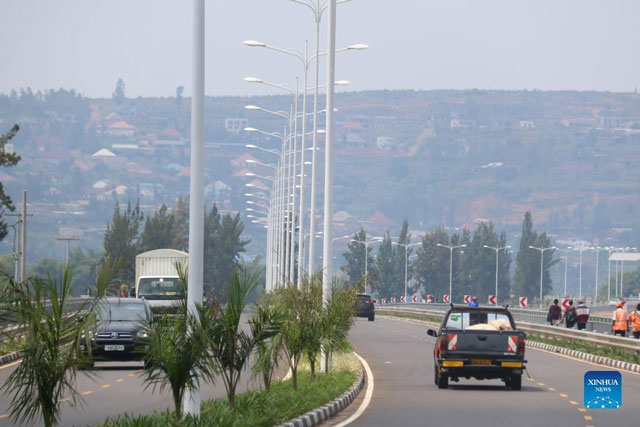
Road in Rwanda

Less than 40% of rural Africans live within two kilometers of an all-season road, the lowest level of rural accessibility in the developing world. Spending on roads averages just below 2% of GDP with varying degree among countries. This compares with 1% of GDP that is typical in industrialised countries, and 2–3% of GDP found in fast-growing emerging economies. Although the level of expenditure is high relative to the size of Africa's economies, it remains small in absolute terms, with low-income countries spending an average of about US$7 per capita per year.

== Demographics ==
=== Major cities ===
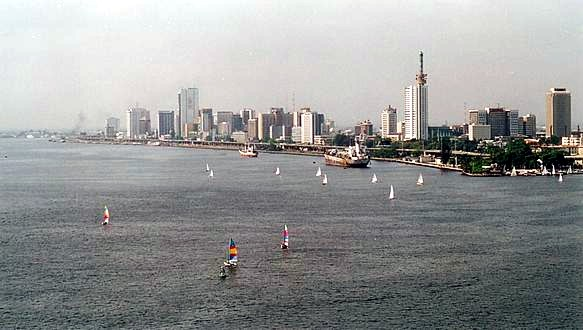
Lagos

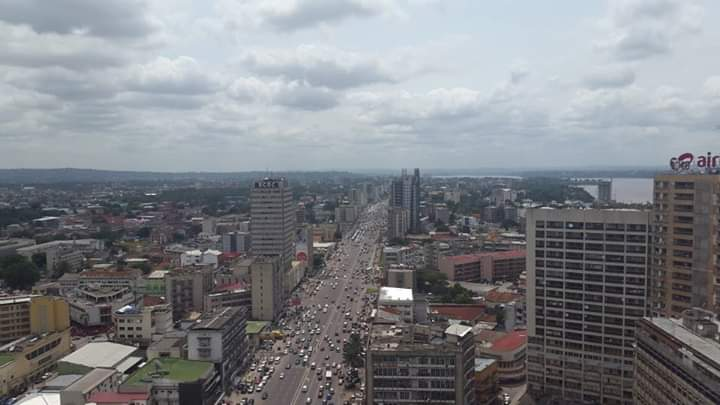
Kinshasa

Sub-Saharan Africa has several large cities. Lagos is a city in the Nigerian state of Lagos. The city, with its adjoining conurbation, is the most populous in Nigeria, and the second-most populous in Africa after Cairo, Egypt. It is one of the fastest-growing cities in the world, and also one of the most populous urban agglomerations. Lagos is a major financial centre in Africa; this megacity has the highest GDP, and also houses Apapa, one of the largest and busiest ports on the continent.

Dar es Salaam is the former capital of, as well as the most populous city in, Tanzania; it is a regionally important economic centre. It is located on the Swahili coast.

Johannesburg is the largest city in South Africa. It is the provincial capital and largest city in Gauteng, which is the wealthiest province in South Africa. While Johannesburg is not one of South Africa's three capital cities, it is the seat of the Constitutional Court. The city is located in the mineral-rich Witwatersrand range of hills, and is the centre of a large-scale gold and diamond trade.

Nairobi is the capital and the largest city of Kenya. The name comes from the Maasai phrase Enkare Nyrobi, which translates to "cool water", a reference to the Nairobi River which flows through the city. The city is popularly referred to as the Green City in the Sun.

Other major cities in sub-Saharan Africa include Abidjan, Cape Town, Kinshasa, Luanda, Mogadishu and Addis Ababa.

Largest cities or towns in Sub Saharan Africa worldpopulationreview.com 2022 City Population estimates.
Rank		Pop.	Rank		Pop.
1	Lagos	21,320,000	11	Yaounde	4,336,670
2	Kinshasa	17,071,000	12	Kano	4,219,209
3	Johannesburg	11,061,878	13	Douala	3,926,645
4	Luanda	8,952,496	14	Ibadan	3,756,445
5	Dar es Salaam	7,404,689	15	Antananarivo	3,669,900
6	Khartoum	6,160,327	16	Abuja	3,652,029
7	Abidjan	5,515,794	17	Kampala	3,651,919
8	Addis Ababa	5,227,794	18	Kumasi	3,630,326
9	Nairobi	5,118,844	19	Dakar	3,326,001
10	Cape Town	4,800,954	20	Port Harcourt	3,324,694

=== Population ===
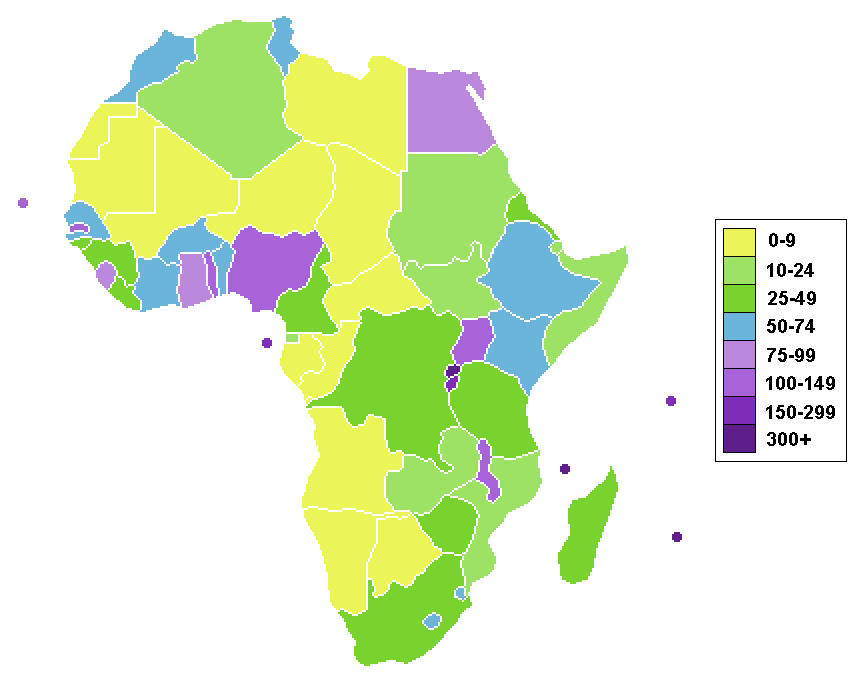
Population density in Africa, 2006

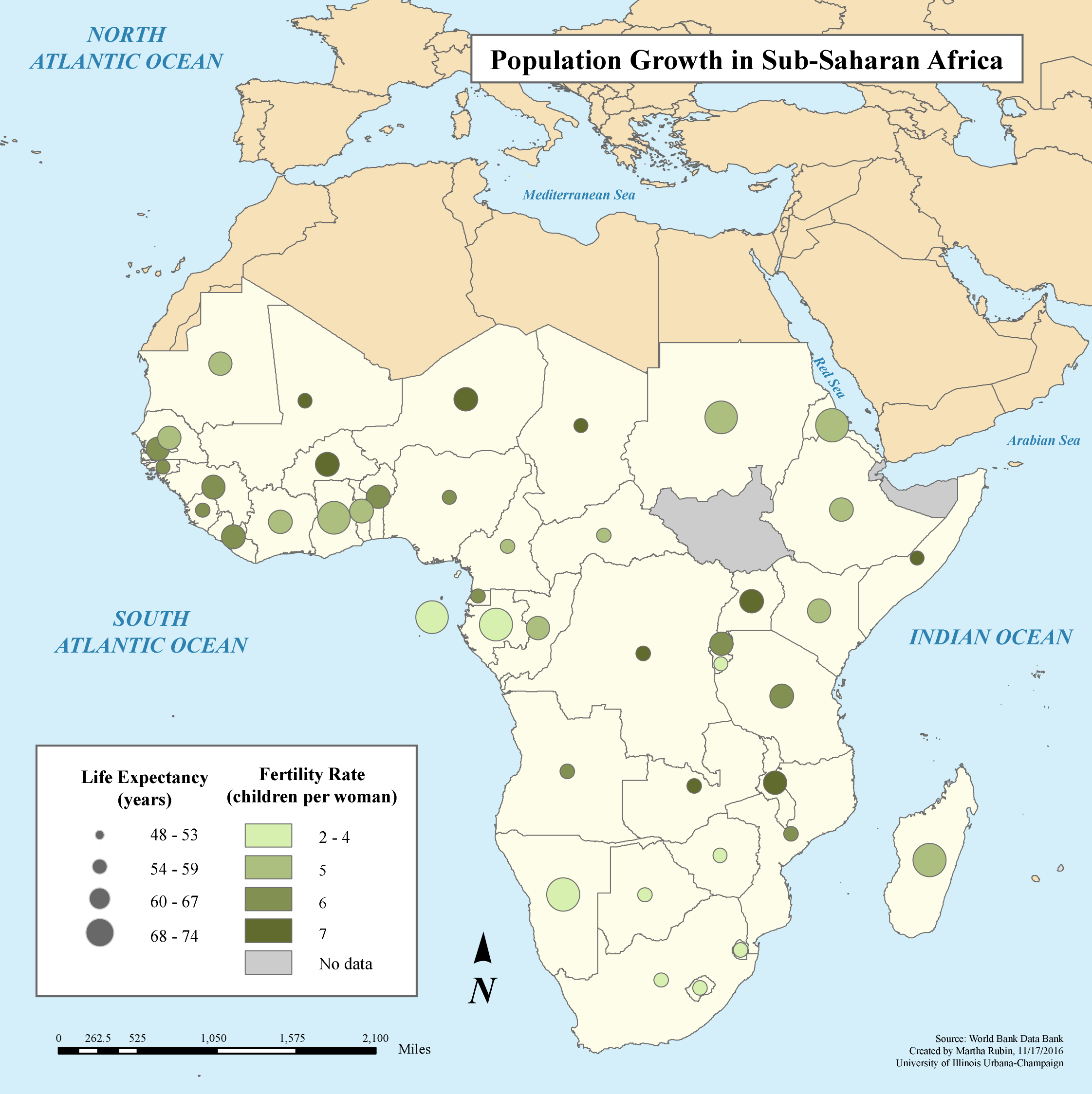
Fertility rates and life expectancy in sub-Saharan Africa

According to the 2022 revision of the World Population Prospects, the population of sub-Saharan Africa was 1.1 billion in 2019. The current growth rate is 2.3%. The UN predicts for the region a population between 2 and 2.5 billion by 2050 with a population density of 80 per km^{2} compared to 170 for Western Europe, 140 for Asia and 30 for the Americas.

Sub-Saharan African countries top the list of countries and territories by fertility rate with 40 of the highest 50, all with TFR greater than 4 in 2008. All are above the world average except South Africa and Seychelles. More than 40% of the population in sub-Saharan countries is younger than 15 years old, as well as in Sudan, with the exception of South Africa.

Country	Population	Area (km^{2})	Literacy (M/F)	GDP per Capita (PPP)	Transparency (Rank/Score)	Life Exp.	HDI	EODBR/SAB	PFI (RANK/MARK)
Angola	18,498,000	1,246,700	82.9%/54.2%	6,800	168/2	42.4	0.486	172/171	132/58,43
Burundi	8,988,091	27,830	67.3%/52.2%	700	168/1.8	49	0.316	176/130	103/29,00
Democratic Republic of the Congo	68,692,542	2,345,410	80.9%/54.1%	800	162/11.9	46.1	0.286	182/152	146/53,50
Cameroon	18,879,301	475,440	77%/59.8%	3,700	146/2.2	50.3	0.482	171/174	109/30,50
Central African Republic	4,511,488	622,984	64.8%/33.5%	700	158/2.8	44.4	0.343	183/159	80/17,75
Chad	10,329,208	1,284,000	40.8%/12.8%	2,300	175/1.6	50.6	0.328	178/182	132/44,50
Republic of the Congo	3,700,000	342,000	90.5%/79.0%	800	162/1.9	54.8	0.533	N/A	116/34,25
Equatorial Guinea	1,110,000	28,051	93.4%/80.3%	37,400	168/1.8	51.1	0.537	170/178	158/65,50
Gabon	1,514,993	267,667	88.5%/79.7%	18,100	106/2.9	56.7	0.674	158/152	129/43,50
Kenya	39,002,772	582,650	77.7%/70.2%	3,500	146/2.2	57.8	0.519	95/124	96/25,00
Nigeria	174,507,539	923,768	84.4%/72.7%	5,900	136/2.7	57	0.504	131/120	112/34,24
Rwanda	10,473,282	26,338	71.4%/59.8%	2,100	89/3.3	46.8	0.429	67/11	157/64,67
São Tomé and Príncipe	212,679	1,001	92.2%/77.9%	3,200	111/2.8	65.2	0.509	180/140	NA
Tanzania	44,928,923	945,087	77.5%/62.2%	3,200	126/2.6	51.9	0.466	131/120	NA/15,50
Uganda	32,369,558	236,040	76.8%/57.7%	2,400	130/2.5	50.7	0.446	112/129	86/21,50
Sudan	31,894,000	1,886,068	79.6%/60.8%	4,300	176/1.5	62.57	0.408	154/118	148/54,00
South Sudan	8,260,490	619,745		1,600					
Djibouti	516,055	23,000	N/A	3,600	111/2.8	54.5	0.430	163/177	110/31,00
Eritrea	5,647,168	121,320	N/A	1,600	126/2.6	57.3	0.349	175/181	175/115,50
Ethiopia	85,237,338	1,127,127	50%/28.8%	2,200	120/2.7	52.5	0.363	107/93	140/49,00
Somalia	9,832,017	637,657	N/A	N/A	180/1.1	47.7	N/A	N/A	164/77,50
Botswana	1,990,876	600,370	80.4%/81.8%	17,000	37/5.6	49.8	0.633	45/83	62/15,50
Comoros	752,438	2,170	N/A	1,600	143/2.3	63.2	0.433	162/168	82/19,00
Lesotho	2,130,819	30,355	73.7%/90.3%	3,300	89/3.3	42.9	0.450	130/131	99/27,50
Madagascar	19,625,000	587,041	76.5%/65.3%	1,600	99/3.0	59	0.480	134/12	134/45,83
Malawi	14,268,711	118,480	N/A	1,200	89/3.3	47.6	0.400	132/128	62/15,50
Mauritius	1,284,264	2,040	88.2%/80.5%	22,300	42/5.4	73.2	0.728	17/10	51/14,00
Mozambique	21,669,278	801,590	N/A	1,300	130/2.5	42.5	0.322	135/96	82/19,00
Namibia	2,108,665	825,418	86.8%/83.6%	11,200	56/4.5	52.5	0.625	66/123	35/9,00
Seychelles	87,476	455	91.4%/92.3%	29,300	54/4.8	72.2	0.773	111/81	72/16,00
South Africa	59,899,991	1,219,912	N/A	13,600	55/4.7	50.7	0.619	34/67	33/8,50
Eswatini	1,123,913	17,363	80.9%/78.3%	11,089	79/3.6	40.8	0.608	115/158	144/52,50
Zambia	11,862,740	752,614	N/A	4,000	99/3.0	41.7	0.430	90/94	97/26,75
Zimbabwe	11,392,629	390,580	92.7%/86.2%	2,300	146/2.2	42.7	0.376	159/155	136/46,50
Benin	8,791,832	112,620	47.9%/42.3%	2,300	106/2.9	56.2	0.427	172/155	97/26,75
Mali	12,666,987	1,240,000	32.7%/15.9%	2,200	111/2.8	53.8	0.359	156/139	38/8,00
Burkina Faso	15,730,977	274,200	25.3%	1,900	79/3.6	51	0.331	150/116	N/A
Cape Verde	499,000	322,462		7,000					
Ivory Coast	20,617,068	322,463		3,900					
Gambia	1,782,893	11,295		2,600					
Ghana	24,200,000	238,535		4,700					
Guinea	10,057,975	245,857		2,200					
Guinea-Bissau	1,647,000	36,125		1,900					
Liberia	4,128,572	111,369		1,300					
Mauritania	3,359,185	1,030,700		4,500					
Niger	17,129,076	1,267,000		1,200					
Senegal	12,855,153	196,712		3,500					
Sierra Leone	6,190,280	71,740		1,600					
Togo	7,154,237	56,785		1,700					

GDP per Capita (PPP) (2016, 2017 (PPP, US$)), Life Exp. (Life Expectancy 2006), Literacy (Male/Female 2006), Trans (Transparency 2009), HDI (Human Development Index), EODBR (Ease of Doing Business Rank June 2008 through May 2009), SAB (Starting a Business June 2008 through May 2009), PFI (Press Freedom Index 2009)

=== Languages and ethnic groups ===
Map showing the traditional language families spoken in Africa

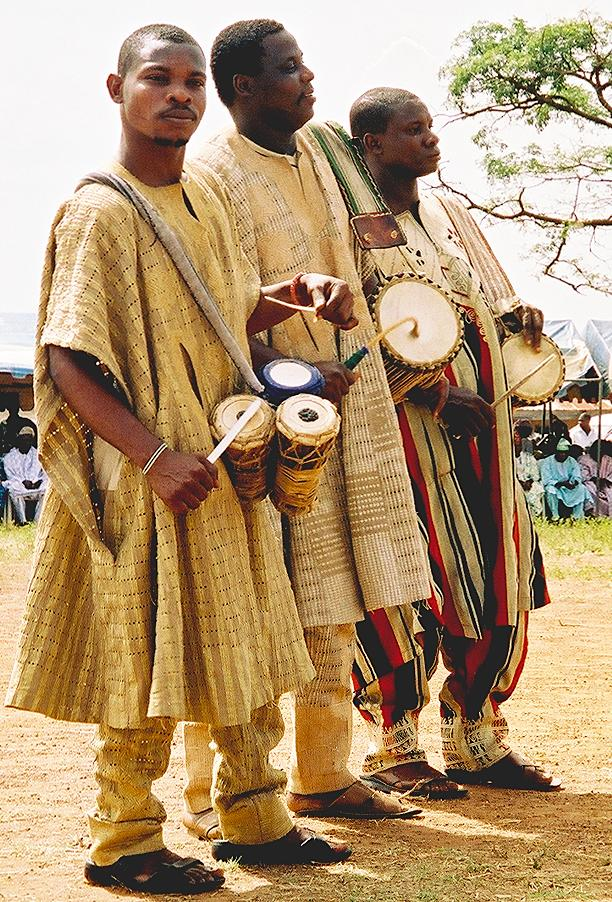
Yoruba drummers (Niger-Congo)

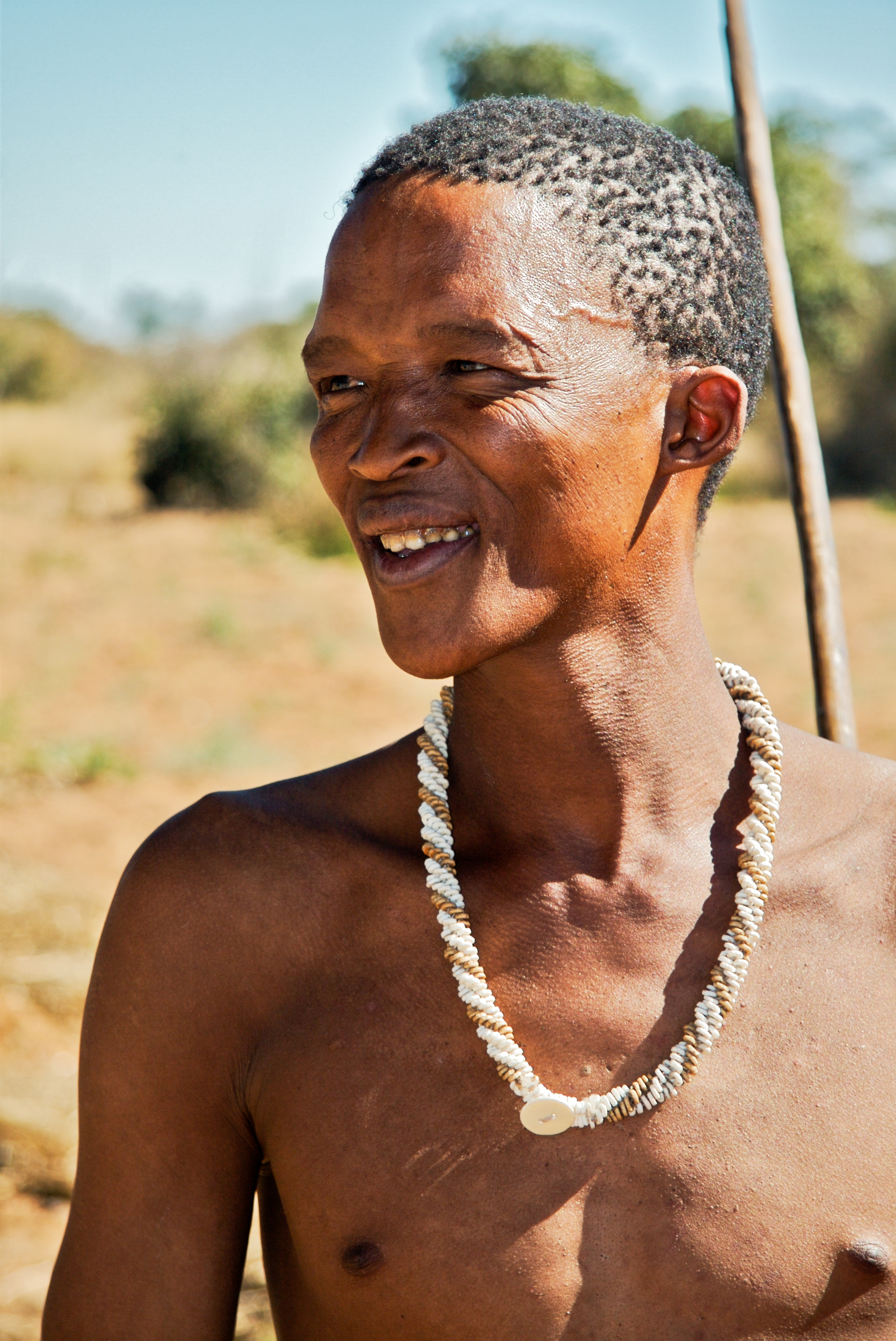
A San man (Khoisan)

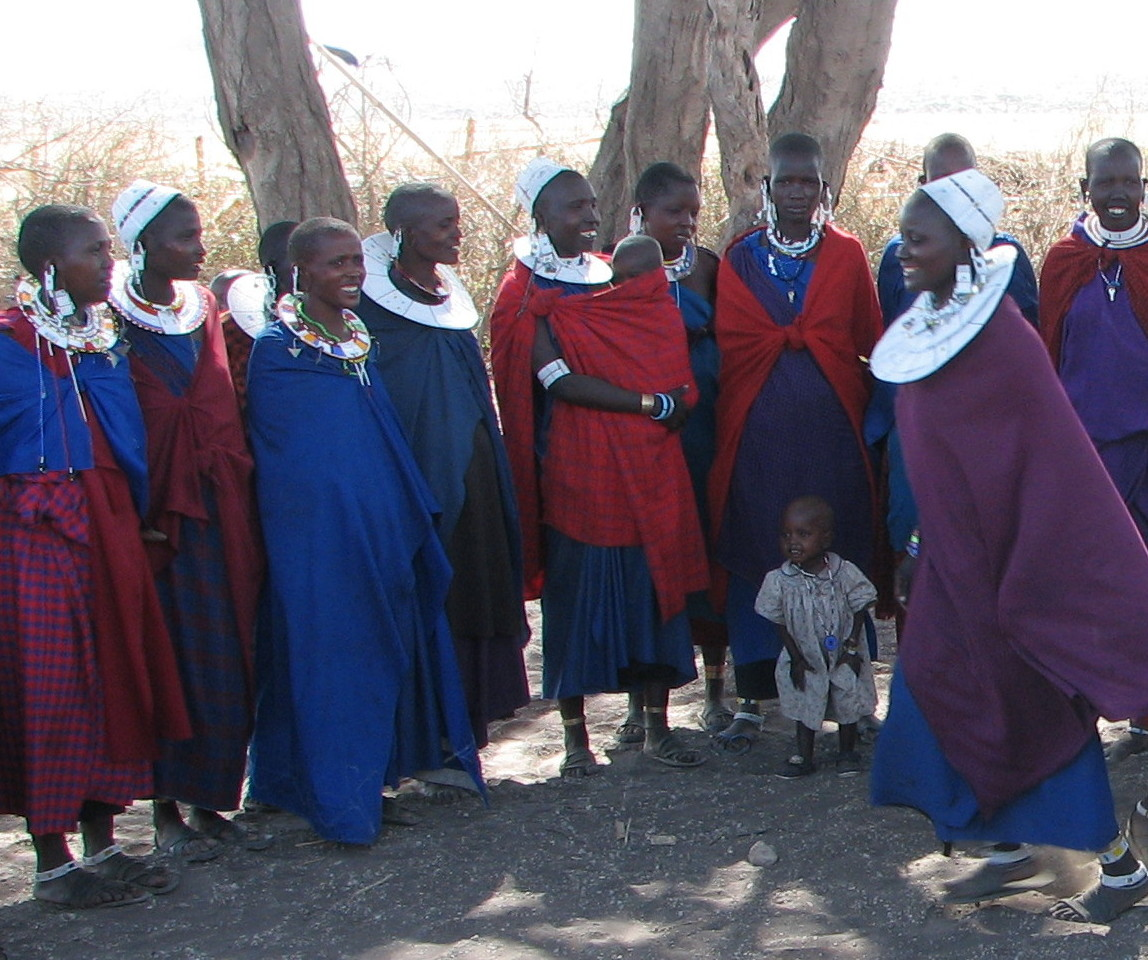
Maasai women and children (Nilo-Saharan)

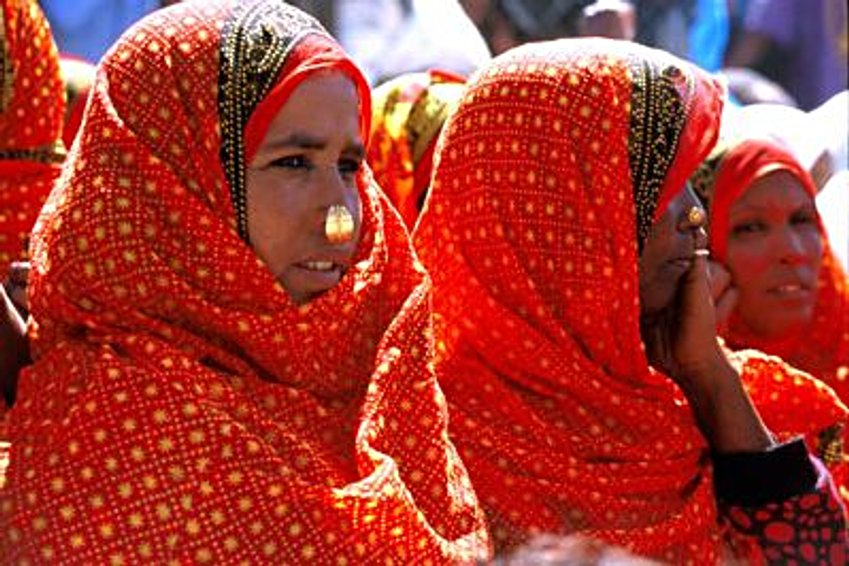
Saho women (Afroasiatic)

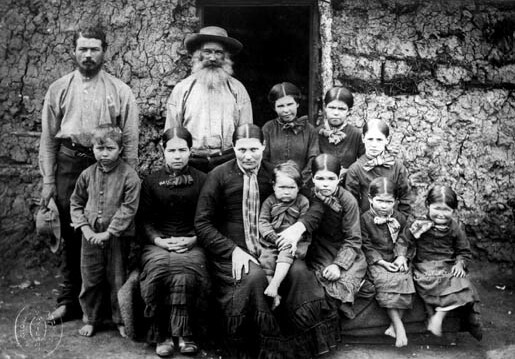
A Boer European African family (Indo-European)

Sub-Saharan Africa contains over 1,500 languages.

==== Afroasiatic ====
With the exception of the extinct Sumerian (a language isolate) of Mesopotamia, Afroasiatic has the oldest documented history of any language family in the world. Egyptian was recorded as early as 3200 BCE. The Semitic branch was recorded as early as 2900 BCE in the form of the Akkadian language of Mesopotamia (Assyria and Babylonia) and circa 2500 BCE in the form of the Eblaite language of northeastern Syria.

The distribution of the Afroasiatic languages within Africa is principally concentrated in North Africa and the Horn of Africa. Languages belonging to the family's Berber branch are mainly spoken in the north, with its speech area extending into the Sahel (northern Mauritania, northern Mali, northern Niger). The Cushitic branch of Afroasiatic is centered in the Horn, and is also spoken in the Nile Valley and parts of the African Great Lakes region. Additionally, the Semitic branch of the family, in the form of Arabic, is widely spoken in the parts of Africa that are within the Arab world. South Semitic languages are also spoken in parts of the Horn of Africa (Ethiopia, Eritrea). The Chadic branch is distributed in Central and West Africa. Hausa, its most widely spoken language, serves as a lingua franca in West Africa (Niger, Ghana, Togo, Benin, Cameroon, and Chad).

==== Khoisan ====
Several languages included under the term Khoi-San are indigenous to Southern Africa and Tanzania, although the Khoi languages appear to have moved to their current locations not long before the Bantu expansion. In Southern Africa, their speakers are the Khoikhoi and San (Bushmen), in Southeast Africa, the Sandawe and Hadza.

==== Niger–Congo ====
The Niger–Congo family is the largest in the world in terms of the number of languages (1,436) it contains. The vast majority of languages of this family are tonal, such as Yoruba and Igbo. However, others such as Fulani, Wolof and Kiswahili are not. A major branch of the Niger–Congo languages is Bantu, which covers a greater geographic area than the rest of the family. Bantu speakers represent the majority of inhabitants in southern, central and southeastern Africa, though San, Pygmy, and Nilotic groups, respectively, can also be found in those regions. Bantu-speakers can also be found in parts of Central Africa such as Gabon, Equatorial Guinea, and southern Cameroon. Swahili, a Bantu language with many Arabic, Persian, and other Middle Eastern and South Asian loan words, developed as a lingua franca for trade between the different peoples in southeastern Africa. In the Kalahari Desert of Southern Africa, the distinct people known as Bushmen (also "San", closely related to, but distinct from "Hottentots") have long been present. The San evince unique physical traits, and are the indigenous people of southern Africa. Pygmies are the pre-Bantu indigenous peoples of Central Africa.

==== Nilo-Saharan ====
The Nilo-Saharan languages are concentrated in the upper parts of the Chari and Nile rivers of Central Africa and Southeast Africa. They are principally spoken by Nilotic peoples and are also spoken in Sudan among the Fur, Masalit, Nubian, and Zaghawa peoples and in West and Central Africa among the Songhai, Zarma, and Kanuri. The Old Nubian language is also a member of this family.

Major languages of Africa by region, family and number of primary language speakers in millions:

Central Africa: Niger–Congo, Bantu; Lingala; Kinyarwanda: 12; Kongo: 5+; Tshiluba; Kirundi; Nilo-Saharan; Nubian: 5+; Fur: 5+; Zaghawa; Masalit; Niger–Congo; Kordofanian languages; Nuba	Horn of Africa: Afro-Asiatic; Semitic; Amharic: 20+; Tigrinya: 5; Cushitic; Somali: 10–15; Oromo: 30–35; Nilo-Saharan: <1; Gumuz; Anuak; Kunama; Nara; Niger–Congo: <1; Zigula; Swahili (Bravanese and Bajuni dialects)	Southeast Africa: Niger–Congo, Bantu: Swahili: 5–10; Gikuyu: 9; Ganda: 20; Luhya: 6; Austronesian; Malagasy: 20+; Niger-Congo, Ubangian; Gbaya: 2; Banda: 1–2; Zande; Nilo-Saharan; Kanuri: 10; Luo: 5; Sara: 3–4; Kalenjin: 5; Dinka; Nuer; Shilluk; Maasai: 1–2	Southern Africa: Niger–Congo, Bantu; Zulu: 10; Xhosa: 8; Shona: 21; Sotho: 5; Tswana: 4; Umbundu: 4; Northern Sotho: 4; Chichewa: 8; Makua: 8; Indo-European; Germanic; Afrikaans: 7–10; Romance; Portuguese: 14	West Africa: Niger–Congo; Benue–Congo; Ibibio (Nigeria): 7; Volta–Niger; Igbo (Nigeria): 30–35; Yoruba: 40; Kwa: Akan (Ghana, Ivory Coast): 20–25; Gur; More: 5; Senegambian; Fula (West Africa): 40; Wolof: 8; Afro-Asiatic; Chadic; Hausa: 50; Nilo-Saharan; Saharan; Kanuri: 10; Songhai: 5; Zarma: 5

=== Religion ===
Religion in Sub Saharan Africa (2020, Pew Research Center)
1. Christianity (62.0%)
2. Islam (32.8%)
3. No religion (2.60%)
4. Others (2.50%)
5. Hinduism (0.10%)

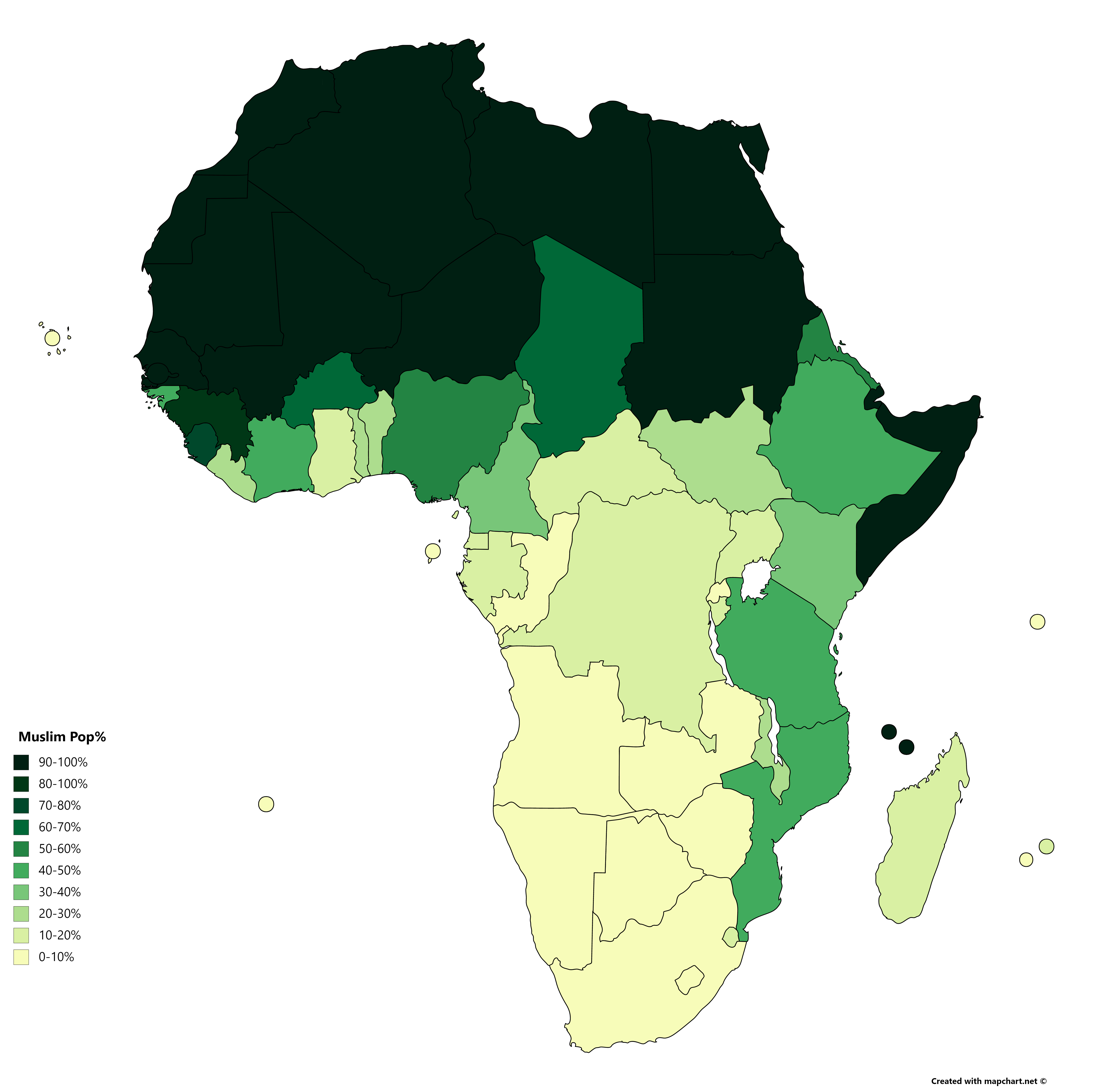
Distribution of Islam in Africa by country

The principal religions of Sub-Saharan Africa are Christianity, Islam and traditional African religions, with Christianity being the largest religion, and religious syncretism being also common. African countries below the Sahara are largely Christian, while those above the Sahara, in North Africa, are predominantly Islamic. There are also Muslim majorities in parts of the Horn of Africa (Djibouti and Somalia) and in the Sahel and Sudan regions (the Gambia, Sierra Leone, Guinea, Mali, Niger, Senegal, Burkina Faso and Chad), as well as significant Muslim communities in Ethiopia and Eritrea, and on the Swahili Coast (Tanzania, Mozambique and Kenya). West Africa is the only subregion of sub-Saharan Africa which has a Muslim majority population, and Nigeria has the largest Muslim population in sub-Saharan Africa.

Mauritius is the only country in Africa to have a Hindu majority. In 2012, sub-Saharan Africa constituted in absolute terms the world's third largest Christian population, after Europe and Latin America respectively. In 2012, sub-Saharan Africa also constituted in absolute terms the world's third largest Muslim population, after Asia and the Middle East and North Africa respectively.

Traditional African religions are also commonly practiced across sub-Saharan Africa, with these religions being especially common in South Sudan, Guinea Bissau, Mozambique, and Cameroon. Traditional African religions can be broken down into linguistic cultural groups, with common themes. Among Niger–Congo-speakers is a belief in a creator god or higher deity, along with ancestor spirits, territorial spirits, evil caused by human ill will and neglecting ancestor spirits, and priests of territorial spirits. New world religions such as Santería, Vodun, and Candomblé, would be derived from this world. Among Nilo-Saharan speakers is the belief in Divinity; evil is caused by divine judgement and retribution; prophets as middlemen between Divinity and man. Among Afro-Asiatic-speakers is henotheism, the belief in one's own gods but accepting the existence of other gods; evil here is caused by malevolent spirits. The Semitic Abrahamic religion of Judaism is comparable to the latter world view. San religion is non-theistic but a belief in a Spirit or Power of existence which can be tapped in a trance-dance; trance-healers.

Generally, traditional African religions are united by an ancient complex animism and ancestor worship.

Traditional religions in sub-Saharan Africa often display complex ontology, cosmology and metaphysics. Mythologies, for example, demonstrated the difficulty fathers of creation had in bringing about order from chaos. Order is what is right and natural and any deviation is chaos. Cosmology and ontology is also neither simple or linear. It defines duality, the material and immaterial, male and female, heaven and earth. Common principles of being and becoming are widespread: Among the Dogon, the principle of Amma (being) and Nummo (becoming), and among the Bambara, Pemba (being) and Faro (becoming).

Ifá divination and its four digit binary code

West Africa

- Akan mythology
- Ashanti mythology (Ghana)
- Dahomey (Fon) mythology
- Efik mythology (Nigeria, Cameroon)
- Igbo mythology (Nigeria)
- Serer religion and Serer creation myth (Senegal, Gambia and Mauritania)
- Yoruba mythology (Nigeria, Benin)

Central Africa

- Dinka mythology (South Sudan)
- Lotuko mythology (South Sudan)
- Bushongo mythology (Congo)
- Bambuti (Pygmy) mythology (Congo)
- Lugbara mythology (Congo)

Southeast Africa

- Akamba mythology (eastern Kenya)
- Masai mythology (Kenya, Tanzania)

Southern Africa

- Khoisan religion
- Lozi mythology (Zambia)
- Tumbuka mythology (Malawi)
- Zulu mythology (South Africa)

Sub-Saharan traditional divination systems display great sophistication. For example, the bamana sand divination uses well established symbolic codes that can be reproduced using four bits or marks. A binary system of one or two marks are combined. Random outcomes are generated using a fractal recursive process. It is analogous to a digital circuit but can be reproduced on any surface with one or two marks. This system is widespread in sub-Saharan Africa.

=== Education ===
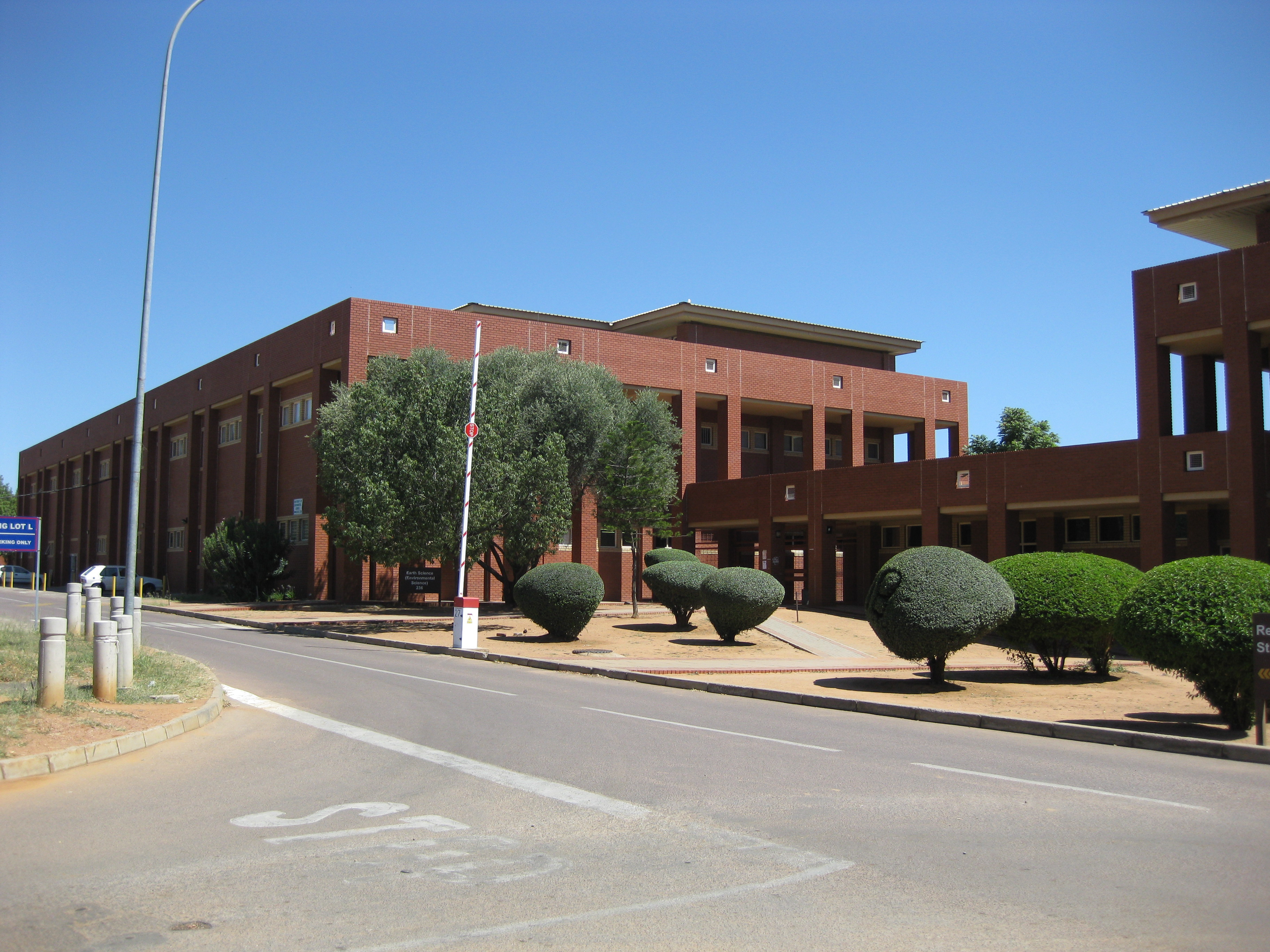
The University of Botswana's Earth Science building in Gaborone, Botswana

Forty per cent of African scientists live in OECD countries, predominantly in Europe, the United States and Canada. This has been described as an African brain drain. Despite this, sub-Saharan African universities tripled between 1991 and 2005, expanding at an annual rate of 8.7%, which is one of the highest regional growth rates in the world. In the last 10 to 15 years interest in pursuing university-level degrees abroad has increased.

According to the CIA, low global literacy rates are concentrated in sub-Saharan Africa, West Asia and South Asia. However, literacy rates in sub-Saharan Africa vary significantly between countries. The highest registered literacy rate in the region is in Zimbabwe (90.7%; 2003 est.), while the lowest literacy rate is in South Sudan (27%).

Research on human capital formation was able to determine, that the numeracy levels of sub-Saharan Africa and Africa, in general, were higher than numeracy levels in South Asia. In the 1940s more than 75% of the population of sub-Saharan Africa was numerate. The numeracy of the West African countries, Benin and Ghana, was even higher with more than 80% of the population being numerate. In contrast, numeracy in South Asia was only around 50%.

Higher diversity in Sub-Saharan African countries has been found to lead to a poorer economy. Researchers have argued that this is because of ethnic favouritism in their politics. Sub-Saharan leaders are more likely to provide better resources to their coethnic groups when in power. A study found that, on average, children of the favoured ethnic group are 2.25% more likely to attend primary school and 1.80% more likely to complete primary school. A 1% increase in GDP is associated with a 1.5% increase in the ethnic favouritism effect on primary school attendance.

Sub-Saharan African countries spent an average of 0.3% of their GDP on science and technology in 2007. This represents an increase from US$1.8 billion in 2002 to US$2.8 billion in 2007, a 50% increase in spending.

==== Major progress in access to education ====
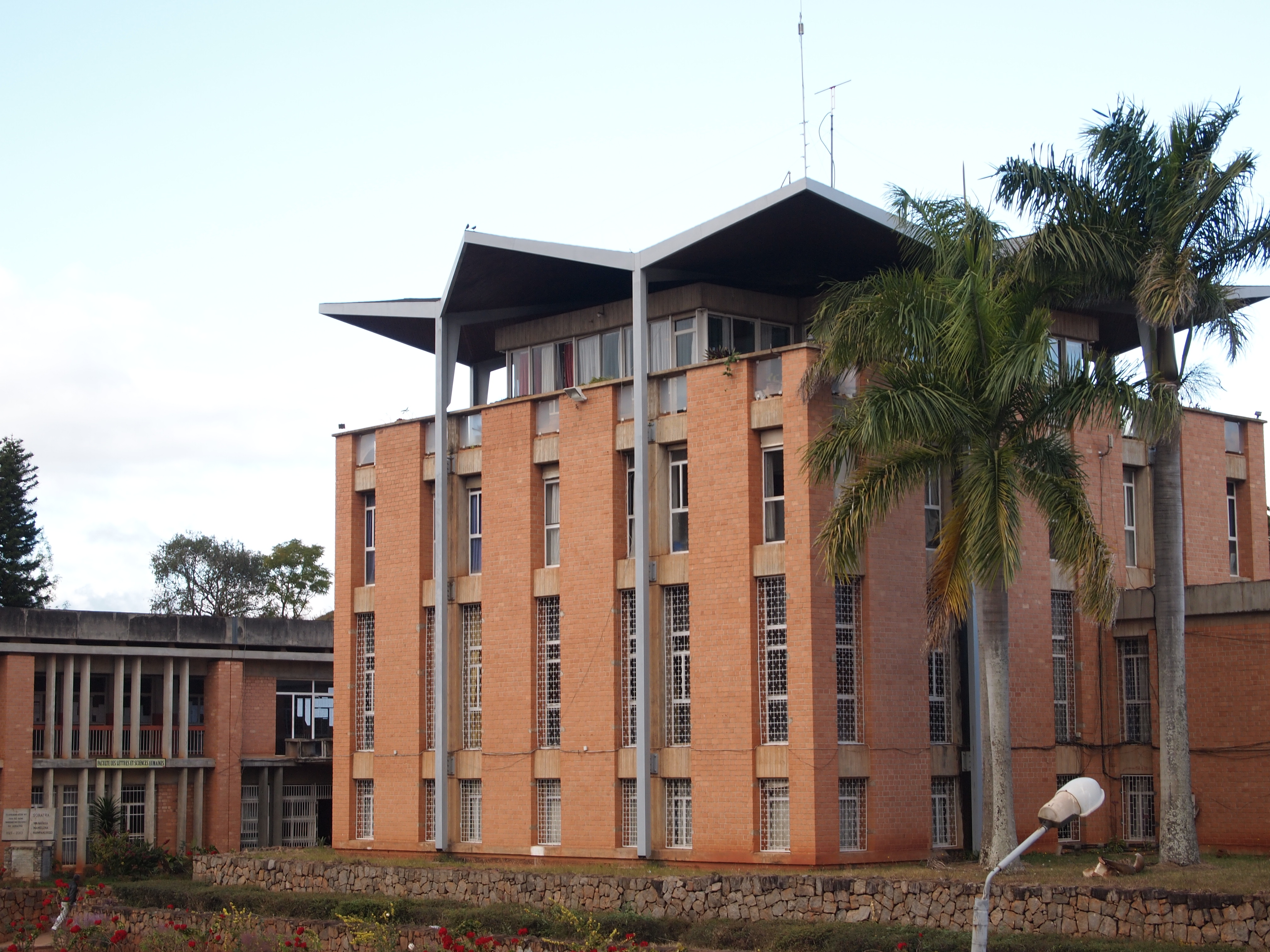
The University of Antananarivo in Antananarivo, Madagascar

At the World Conference held in Jomtien, Thailand in 1990, delegates from 155 countries and representatives of some 150 organisations gathered with the goal to promote universal primary education and the radical reduction of illiteracy before the end of the decade. The World Education Forum, held ten years later in Dakar, Senegal, provided the opportunity to reiterate and reinforce these goals. This initiative contributed to having education made a priority of the Millennium Development Goals in 2000, with the aim of achieving universal schooling (MDG2) and eliminating gender disparities, especially in primary and secondary education (MDG3). Since the World Education Forum in Dakar, considerable efforts have been made to respond to these demographic challenges in terms of education. The amount of funds raised has been decisive. Between 1999 and 2010, public spending on education as a percentage of gross national product (GNP) increased by 5% per year in sub-Saharan Africa, with major variations between countries, with percentages varying from 1.8% in Cameroon to over 6% in Burundi. As of 2015, governments in sub-Saharan Africa spend on average 18% of their total budget on education, against 15% in the rest of the world.

In the years immediately after the Dakar Forum, the efforts made by the African States towards achieving EFA produced multiple results in sub-Saharan Africa. The greatest advance was in access to primary education, which governments had made their absolute priority. The number of children in a primary school in sub-Saharan Africa thus rose from 82 million in 1999 to 136.4 million in 2011. In Niger, for example, the number of children entering school increased by more than three-and-a-half times between 1999 and 2011. In Ethiopia, over the same period, over 8.5 million more children were admitted to primary school. The net rate of first-year access in sub-Saharan Africa has thus risen by 19 points in 12 years, from 58% in 1999 to 77% in 2011. Despite the considerable efforts, the latest available data from the UNESCO Institute for Statistics estimates that, for 2012, there were still 57.8 million children who were not in school. Of these, 29.6 million were in sub-Saharan Africa alone, a figure which has not changed for several years. Many sub-Saharan countries have notably included the first year of secondary school in basic education. In Rwanda, the first year of secondary school was attached to primary education in 2009, which significantly increased the number of pupils enrolled at this level of education. In 2012, the primary completion rate (PCR) – which measures the proportion of children reaching the final year of primary school – was 70%, meaning that more than three out of ten children entering primary school do not reach the final primary year.

Literacy rates have gone up in sub-Saharan Africa, and internet access has improved considerably. At least 39 countries in sub-Saharan Africa have some large-scale school feeding programs, which can improve access to education. In aggregate, 16% of school-age children (and 25% of primary school-age children) in the region benefit from school meal programs, and about 82% of the funding for these programs is provided by governments. Nonetheless, a lot must yet happen for this region to catch up. The statistics show that the literacy rate for sub-Saharan Africa was 65% in 2017. In other words, one-third of the people aged 15 and above were unable to read and write. The comparative figure for 1984 was an illiteracy rate of 49%. In 2017, only about 22% of Africans were internet users at all, according to the International Telecommunication Union (ITU).

=== Health ===
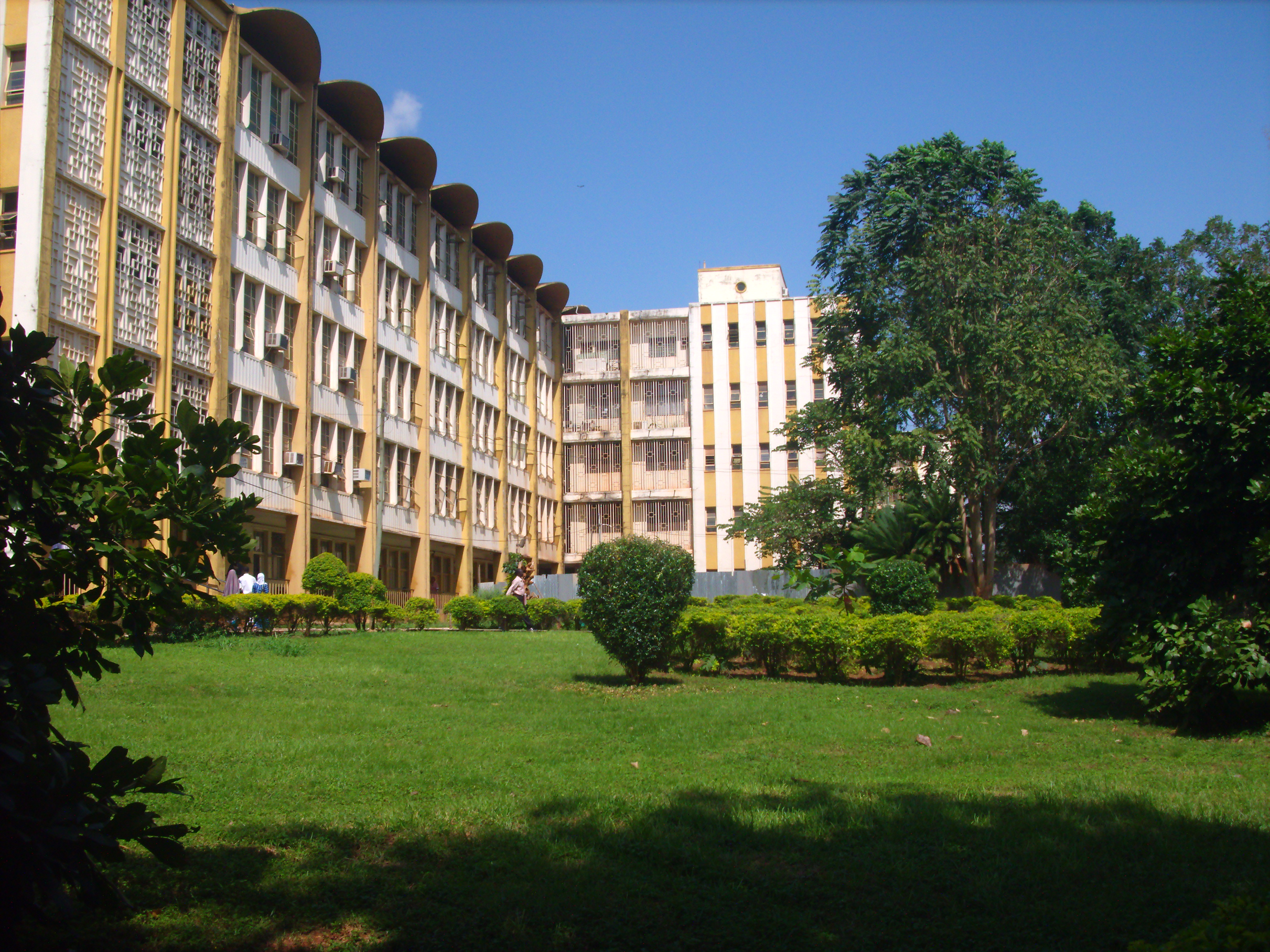
The Komfo Anokye Hospital in Kumasi, Ghana

Health challenges in Sub-Saharan Africa include HIV/AIDS in Africa, malaria, neglected tropical diseases, tuberculosis, onchocerciasis, maternal mortality and infant mortality.

In 1987, the Bamako Initiative conference organized by the World Health Organization was held in Bamako, the capital of Mali, and helped reshape the health policy of sub-Saharan Africa. The new strategy dramatically increased accessibility through community-based healthcare reform, resulting in more efficient and equitable provision of services. A comprehensive approach strategy was extended to all areas of health care, with subsequent improvement in the health care indicators and improvement in health care efficiency and cost.

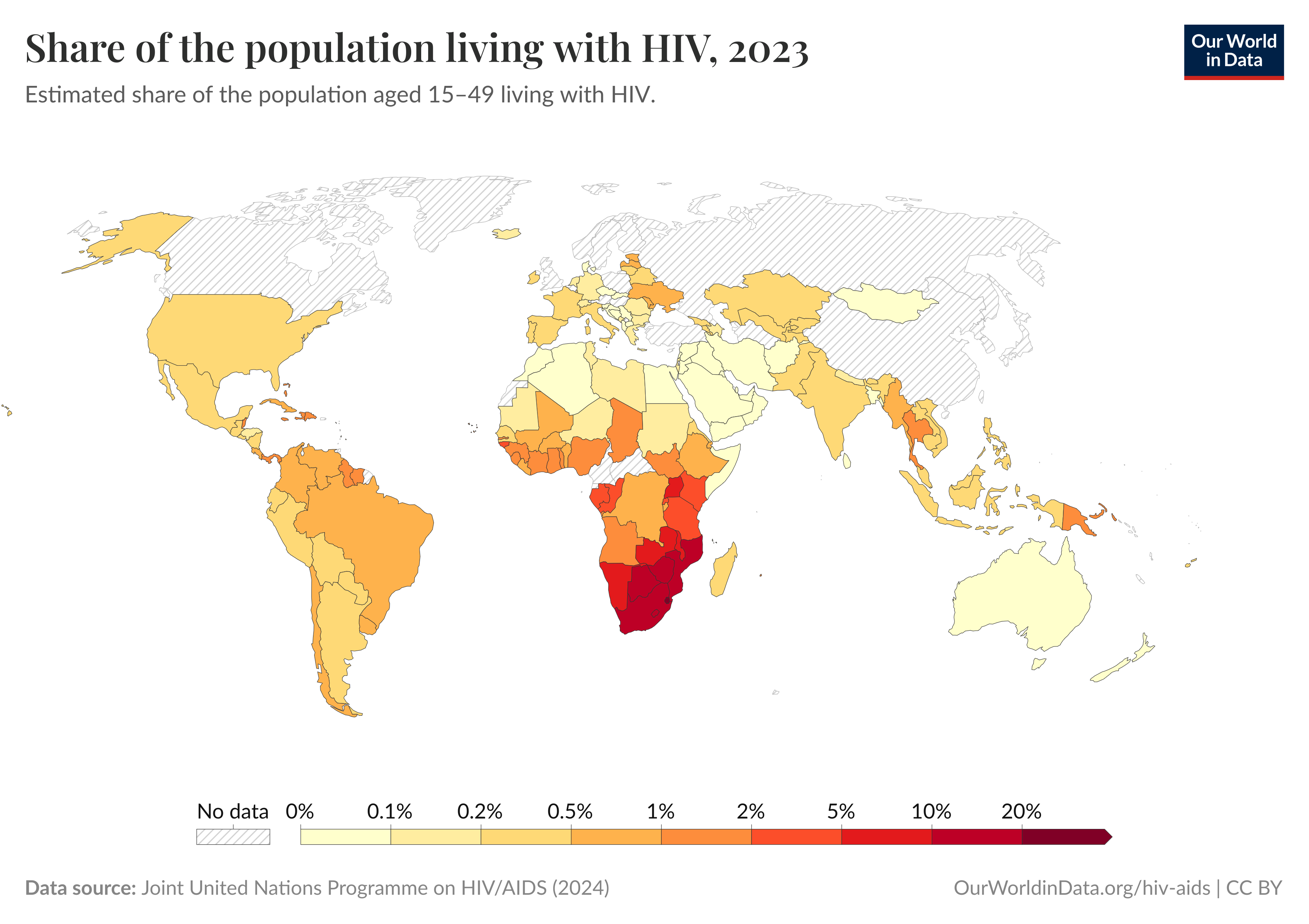
A world map illustrating the proportion of population aged 15–49 infected with HIV in 2023. HIV is endemic especially in Southern Africa.

In 2011, sub-Saharan Africa was home to 69% of all people living with HIV/AIDS worldwide. In response, a number of initiatives have been launched to educate the public on HIV/AIDS. Among these are combination prevention programmes, considered to be the most effective initiative, the abstinence, be faithful, use a condom campaign, and the Desmond Tutu HIV Foundation's outreach programs. According to a 2013 special report issued by the Joint United Nations Programme on HIV/AIDS (UNAIDS), the number of HIV positive people in Africa receiving anti-retro viral treatment in 2012 was over seven times the number receiving treatment in 2005, with an almost 1 million added in the last year alone. The number of AIDS-related deaths in sub-Saharan Africa in 2011 was 33 per cent less than the number in 2005. The number of new HIV infections in sub-Saharan Africa in 2011 was 25 per cent less than the number in 2001.

Life expectancy at birth in sub-Saharan Africa increased from 40 years in 1960 to 61 years in 2017.

Malaria is an endemic illness in sub-Saharan Africa, where the majority of malaria cases and deaths worldwide occur. Routine immunisation has been introduced in order to prevent measles. Onchocerciasis ("river blindness"), a common cause of blindness, is also endemic to parts of the region. More than 99% of people affected by the illness worldwide live in 31 countries therein. In response, the African Programme for Onchocerciasis Control (APOC) was launched in 1995 with the aim of controlling the disease. Maternal mortality is another challenge, with more than half of maternal deaths in the world occurring in sub-Saharan Africa. However, there has generally been progress here as well, as a number of countries in the region have halved their levels of maternal mortality since 1990. Additionally, the African Union in July 2003 ratified the Maputo Protocol, which pledges to prohibit female genital mutilation (FGM). Somalia, Guinea, Djibouti, Sierra Leone and Mali have the highest prevalence of FGM in the world. Infibulation, the most extreme form of FGM, is concentrated primarily in Northeast Africa.

National health systems vary between countries. In Ghana, most health care is provided by the government and largely administered by the Ministry of Health and Ghana Health Services. The healthcare system has five levels of providers: health posts which are first-level primary care for rural areas, health centers and clinics, district hospitals, regional hospitals, and tertiary hospitals. These programs are funded by the government of Ghana, financial credits, Internally Generated Fund (IGF), and Donors-pooled Health Fund. Ebola virus disease, which was first identified in 1976, occasionally occurs in outbreaks in tropical regions of Sub-Saharan Africa. The 2013–2016 Western African Ebola virus epidemic originated in Guinea, later spreading to neighbouring Liberia and Sierra Leone.

== Culture ==
Sub-Saharan Africa is diverse, with many communities, villages, and cities, each with their own beliefs and traditions. Traditional African Societies are communal, they believe that the needs of the many far outweigh an individual's needs and achievements. Essentially, an individual's keep must be shared with other extended family members. Extended families are made up of various individuals and families who have shared responsibilities within the community. This extended family is one of the core aspects of every African community. "An African will refer to an older person as auntie or uncle. Siblings of parents will be called father or mother rather than uncle and aunt. Cousins will be called brother or sister". This system can be very difficult for outsiders to understand; however, it is no less important. "Also reflecting their communal ethic, Africans are reluctant to stand out in a crowd or to appear different from their neighbours or colleagues, a result of social pressure to avoid offense to group standards and traditions." Women also have a very important role in African culture because they take care of the house and children. Traditionally, in many cultures "men do the heavy work of clearing and ploughing the land, women sow the seeds, tend the fields, harvest the crops, haul the water, and bear the major burden for growing the family's food". Despite their work in the fields, women are expected to be subservient to men in some African cultures. "When young women migrate to cities, this imbalance between the sexes, as well as financial need, often causes young women of lower economic status, who lack education and job training, to have sexual relationships with older men who are established in their work or profession and can afford to support a girlfriend or two".

=== Art ===
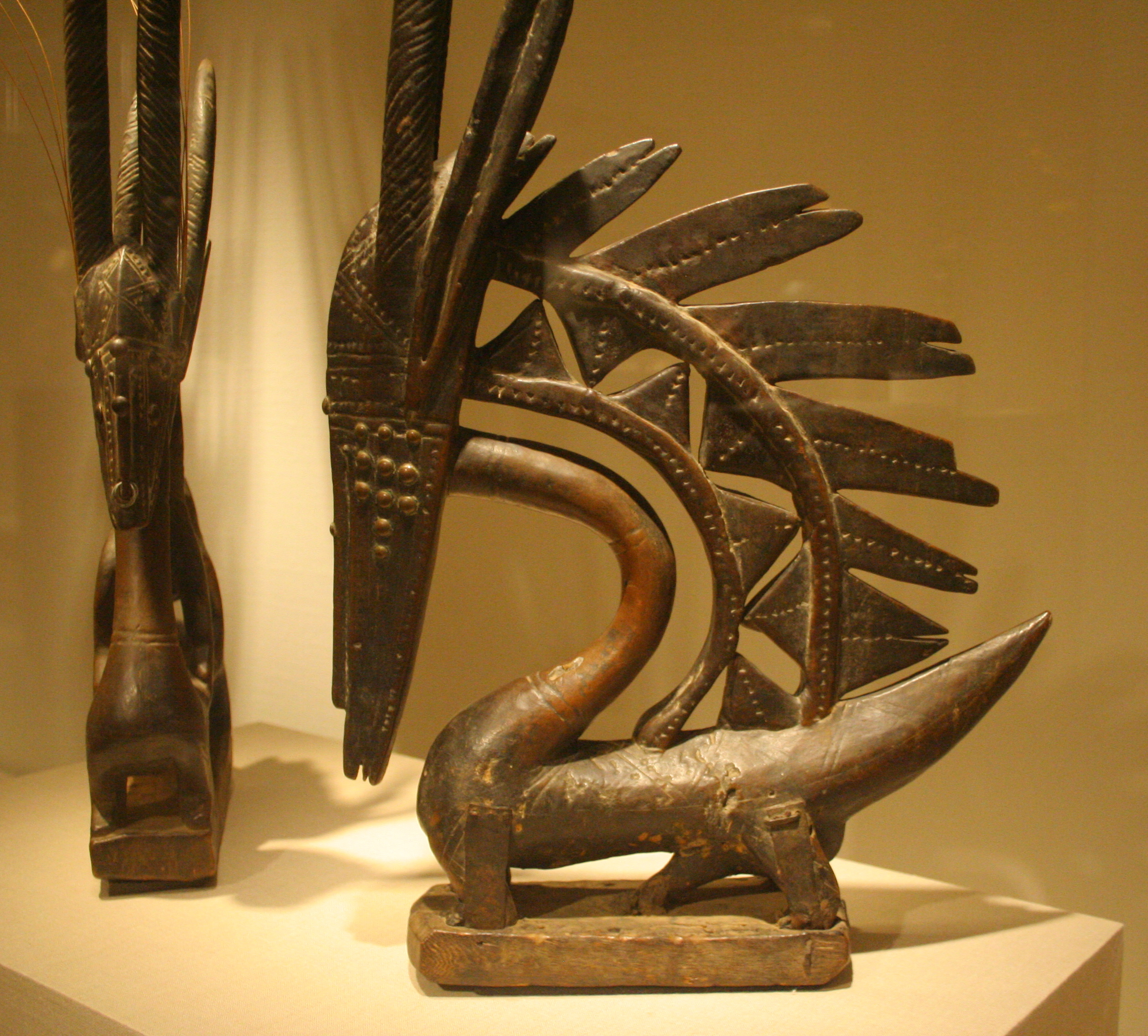
Two Bambara Chiwara c. late 19th / early 20th centuries. Female (left) and male Vertical styles.

The oldest abstract art in the world is a shell necklace, dated to 82,000 years, in the Cave of Pigeons in Taforalt, eastern Morocco. The second-oldest abstract form of art, and the oldest rock art, is found in the Blombos Cave at the Cape in South Africa, dated 77,000 years. Sub-Saharan Africa has some of the oldest and most varied style of rock art in the world.

Although sub-Saharan African art is very diverse, there are some common themes. One is the use of the human figure. Second, there is a preference for sculpture. Sub-Saharan African art is meant to be experienced in three dimensions, not two. A house is meant to be experienced from all angles. Third, art is meant to be performed. Sub-Saharan Africans have a specific name for masks. The name incorporates the sculpture, the dance, and the spirit that incorporates the mask. The name denotes all three elements. Fourth, art that serves a practical function. The artist and craftsman are not separate. A sculpture shaped like a hand can be used as a stool. Fifth, the use of fractals or non-linear scaling. The shape of the whole is the shape of the parts at different scales. Before the discovery of fractal geometry, Leopold Sedar Senghor, Senegal's first president, referred to this as "dynamic symmetry". William Fagg, a British art historian, has compared it to the logarithmic mapping of natural growth by biologist D'Arcy Thompson. Lastly, sub-Saharan African art is visually abstract, instead of naturalistic. Sub-Saharan African art represents spiritual notions, social norms, ideas, values, etc. An artist might exaggerate the head of a sculpture in relation to the body not because he does not know anatomy but because he wants to illustrate that the head is the seat of knowledge and wisdom.

The visual abstraction of African art was very influential in the works of modernist artists like Pablo Picasso, Henri Matisse, and Jacques Lipchitz.

=== Music ===
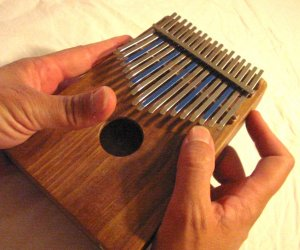
A traditional polyrhythmic kalimba

Traditional sub-Saharan African music is as diverse as the region's various populations. The common perception of sub-Saharan African music is that it is rhythmic music centered around the drums. This is partially true. A large part of sub-Saharan music, mainly among speakers of Niger–Congo and Nilo-Saharan languages, is rhythmic and centered around the drum. Sub-Saharan music is polyrhythmic, usually consisting of multiple rhythms in one composition. Dance involves moving multiple body parts. These aspects of sub-Saharan music has been transferred to the new world by enslaved sub-Saharan Africans and can be seen in its influence on music forms as samba, jazz, rhythm and blues, rock and roll, salsa, reggae and rap music.

Some forms of sub-Saharan African music use strings, horns, and very little poly-rhythms. Music from the eastern Sahel and along the Nile, among the Nilo-Saharan, made extensive use of strings and horns in ancient times. Among the Afro-Asiatics of Northeast Africa, there is extensive use of string instruments and the pentatonic scale. Dancing involves swaying body movements and footwork. Among the San is extensive use of string instruments with emphasis on footwork.

Modern sub-Saharan African music has been influenced by music from the New World (Jazz, Salsa, Rhythm and Blues etc.) vice versa being influenced by enslaved sub-Saharan Africans. Popular styles are Mbalax in Senegal and Gambia, Highlife in Ghana, Zoblazo in Ivory Coast, Makossa in Cameroon, Soukous in the Democratic Republic of the Congo, Kizomba in Angola, and Mbaqanga in South Africa. New World styles like Salsa, R&B/Rap, Reggae, and Zouk also have widespread popularity.

=== Clothing ===
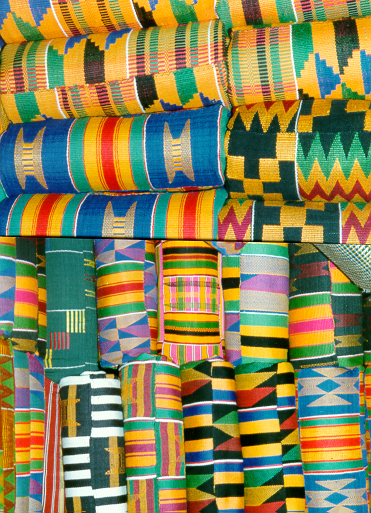
The Akan Kente cloth patterns

Like most of the world, sub-Saharan Africans have adopted Western-style clothing. In some countries like Zambia, used Western clothing has flooded markets, causing great angst in the retail community. Sub-Saharan Africa boasts its own traditional clothing style. Cotton seems to be the dominant material.

In East Africa, one finds extensive use of cotton clothing. Shemma, shama, and kuta are types of Ethiopian clothing. Kanga are Swahili cloth that comes in rectangular shapes, made of pure cotton, and put together to make clothing. Kitenges are similar to kangas and kikoy, but are of a thicker cloth, and have an edging only on a long side. Kenya, Uganda, Tanzania, and South Sudan are some of the African countries where kitenge is worn. In Malawi, Namibia and Zambia, kitenge is known as Chitenge. One of the unique materials, which is not a fiber and is used to make clothing is barkcloth, an innovation of the Baganda people of Uganda. It came from the Mutuba tree (Ficus natalensis). In Madagascar a type of draped cloth called lamba is worn.

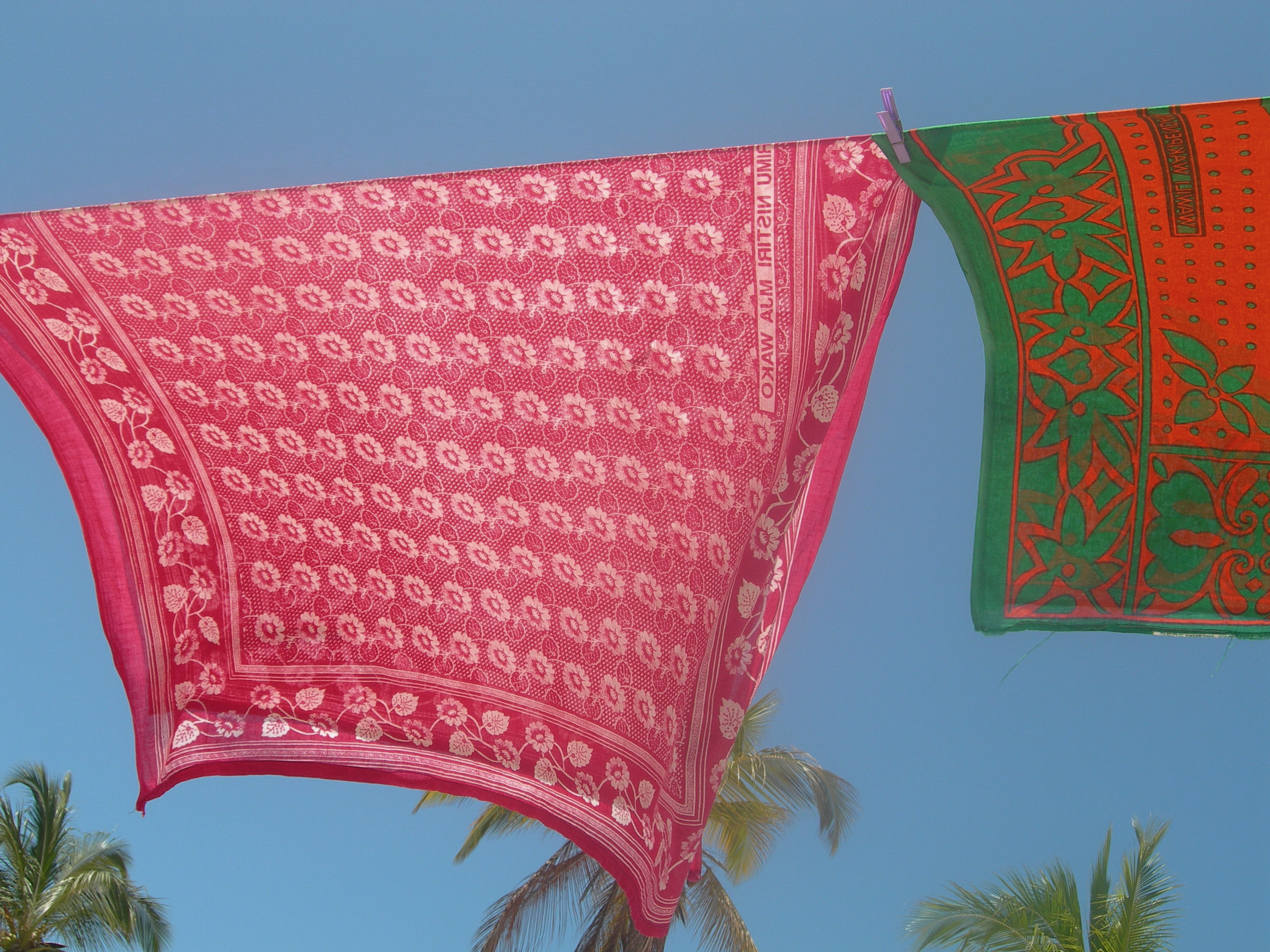
Kangas

In West Africa, again cotton is the material of choice. In the Sahel and other parts of West Africa the boubou and kaftan style of clothing are featured. Kente cloth is created by the Akan people of Ghana and Ivory Coast, from silk of the various moth species in West Africa. Kente comes from the Akan twi word kenten which means basket. It is sometimes used to make dashiki and kufi. Adire is a type of Yoruba cloth that is starch resistant. Raffia cloth and barkcloth are also utilised in the region.

In Central Africa, the Kuba people developed raffia cloth from the raffia plant fibers. It was widely used in the region. Barkcloth was also extensively used.

In Southern Africa, one finds numerous uses of animal hide and skins for clothing. The Ndau in central Mozambique and the Shona mix hide with barkcloth and cotton cloth. Cotton cloth is referred to as machira. Xhosa, Tswana, Sotho, and Swazi also made extensive use of hides. Hides come from cattle, sheep, goat, and elephant. Leopard skins were coveted and were a symbol of kingship in Zulu society. Skins were tanned to form leather, dyed, and embedded with beads.

=== Media ===
In 2007, radio was the major source of information in sub-Saharan Africa. Average coverage stands at more than a third of the population. Countries such as Gabon, Seychelles, and South Africa boast almost 100% penetration. Only five countries—Burundi, Djibouti, Eritrea, Ethiopia, and Somalia—still have a penetration of less than 10%. Broadband penetration outside of South Africa has been limited where it is exorbitantly expensive. Access to the internet via cell phones is on the rise.

Television is the second major source of information. Because of power shortages, the spread of television viewing has been limited. Eight per cent have television, a total of 62 million. Those in the television industry view the region as an untapped green market. Digital television and pay for service are on the rise.

=== Cuisine ===
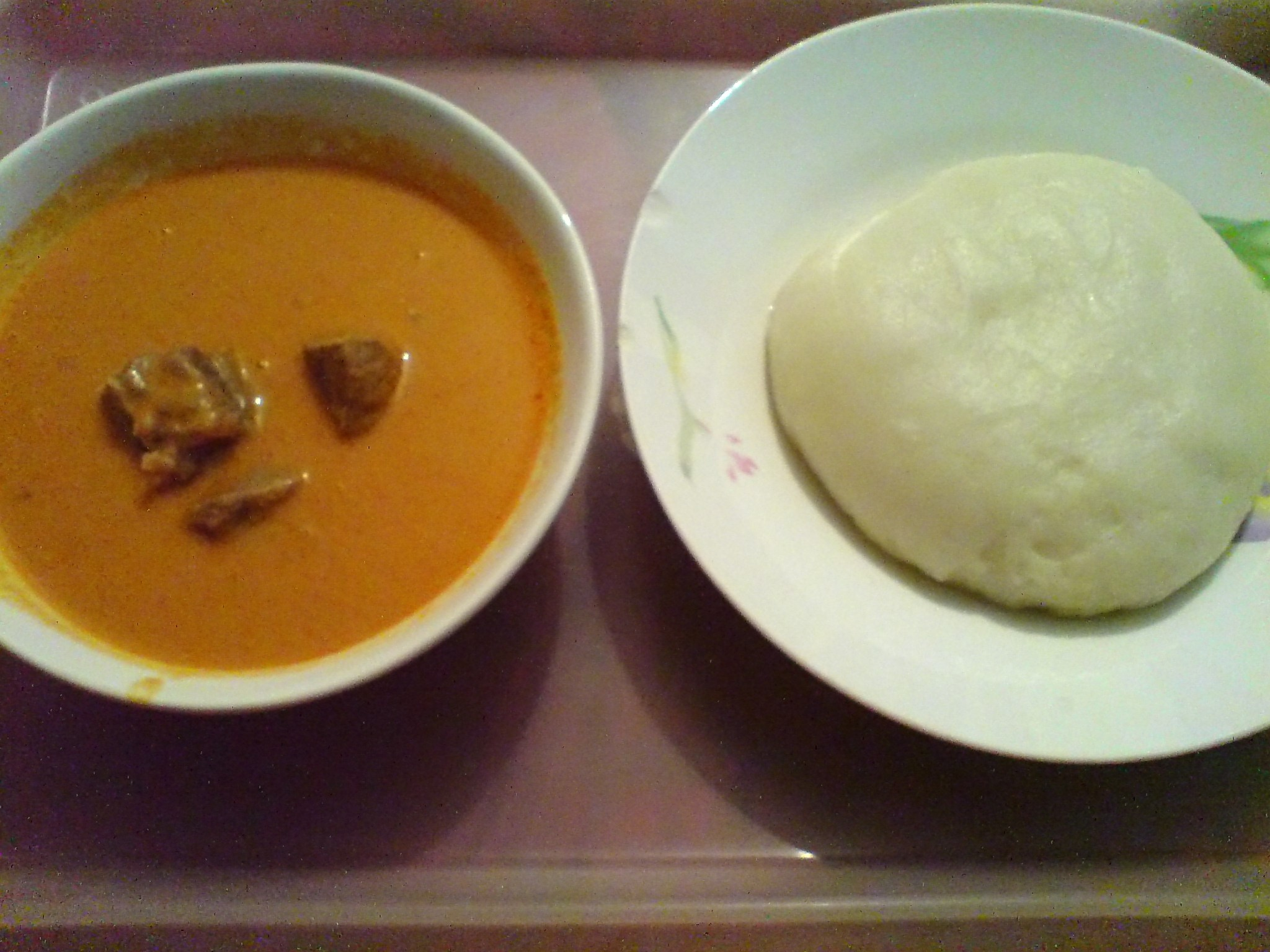
A plate of fufu accompanied with peanut soup

Sub-Saharan African cuisine is very diverse. A lot of regional overlapping occurs, but there are dominant elements region by region.

West African cuisine can be described as starchy, flavorfully spicey. Dishes include fufu, kenkey, couscous, garri, foutou, and banku. Ingredients are of native starchy tubers, yams, cocoyams, and cassava. Grains include millet, sorghum, and rice, usually in the Sahel. Oils include palm oil and shea butter (Sahel). One finds recipes that mix fish and meat. Beverages are palm wine (sweet or sour) and millet beer. Roasting, baking, boiling, frying, mashing, and spicing are all cooking techniques.

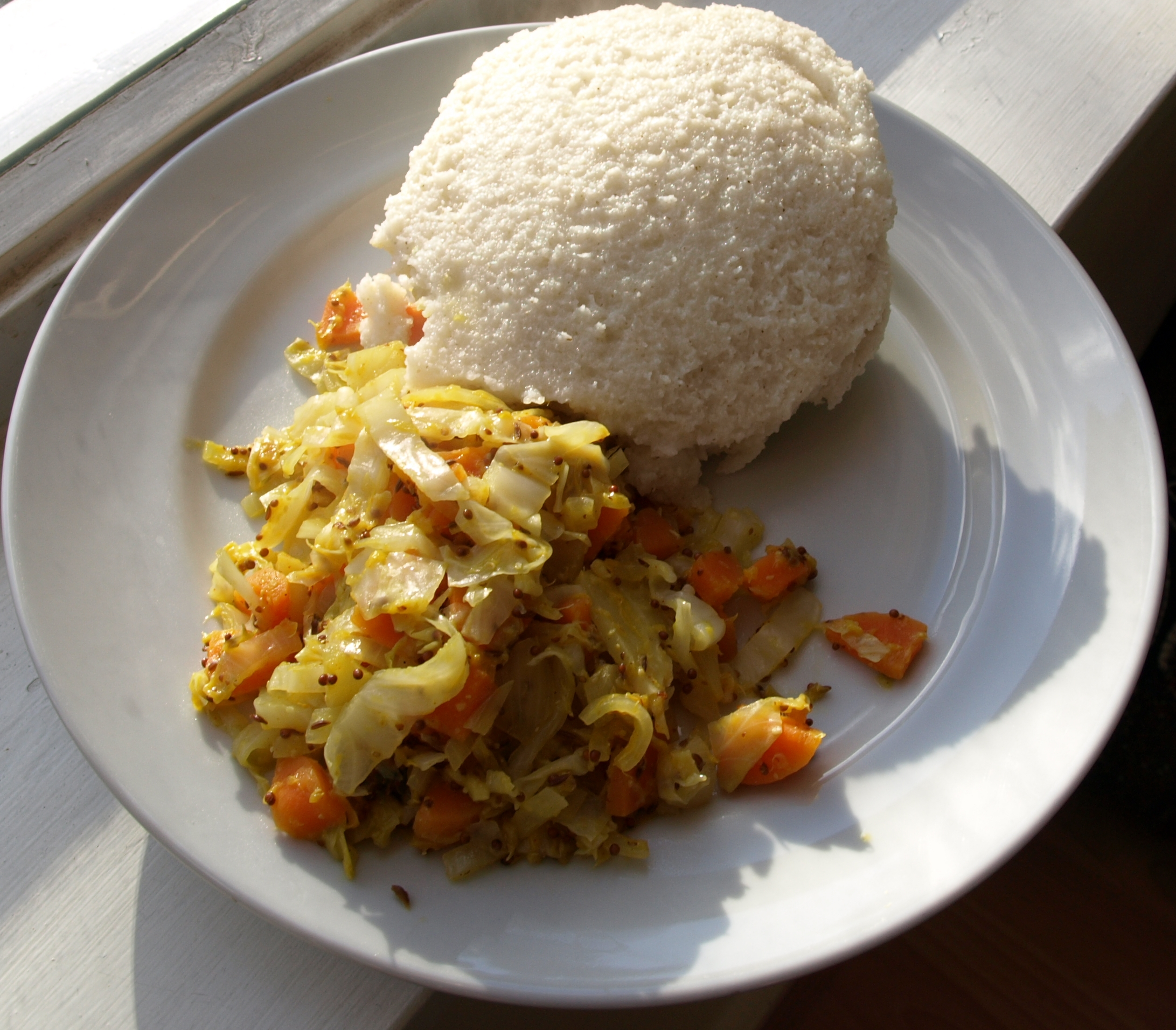
Ugali and cabbage

Southeast African cuisine, especially those of the Swahili people, reflects its Islamic, geographical Indian Ocean cultural links. Dishes include ugali, sukuma wiki, and halva. Spices such as curry, saffron, cloves, cinnamon, pomegranate juice, cardamon, ghee, and sage are used, especially among Muslims. Meat includes cattle, sheep, and goats, but is rarely eaten since meat is viewed as a luxury.

In the Horn of Africa, pork and non-fish seafood are avoided by Christians and Muslims. Dairy products and all meats are avoided during lent by Ethiopians. Maize (corn) is a major staple. Cornmeal is used to make ugali, a popular dish with different names. Teff is used to make injera or canjeero (Somali) bread. Other important foods include enset, noog, lentils, rice, banana, leafy greens, chili peppers, coconut milk, and tomatoes. Beverages are coffee (domesticated in Ethiopia), chai tea, fermented beer from banana or millet. Cooking techniques include roasting and marinating.

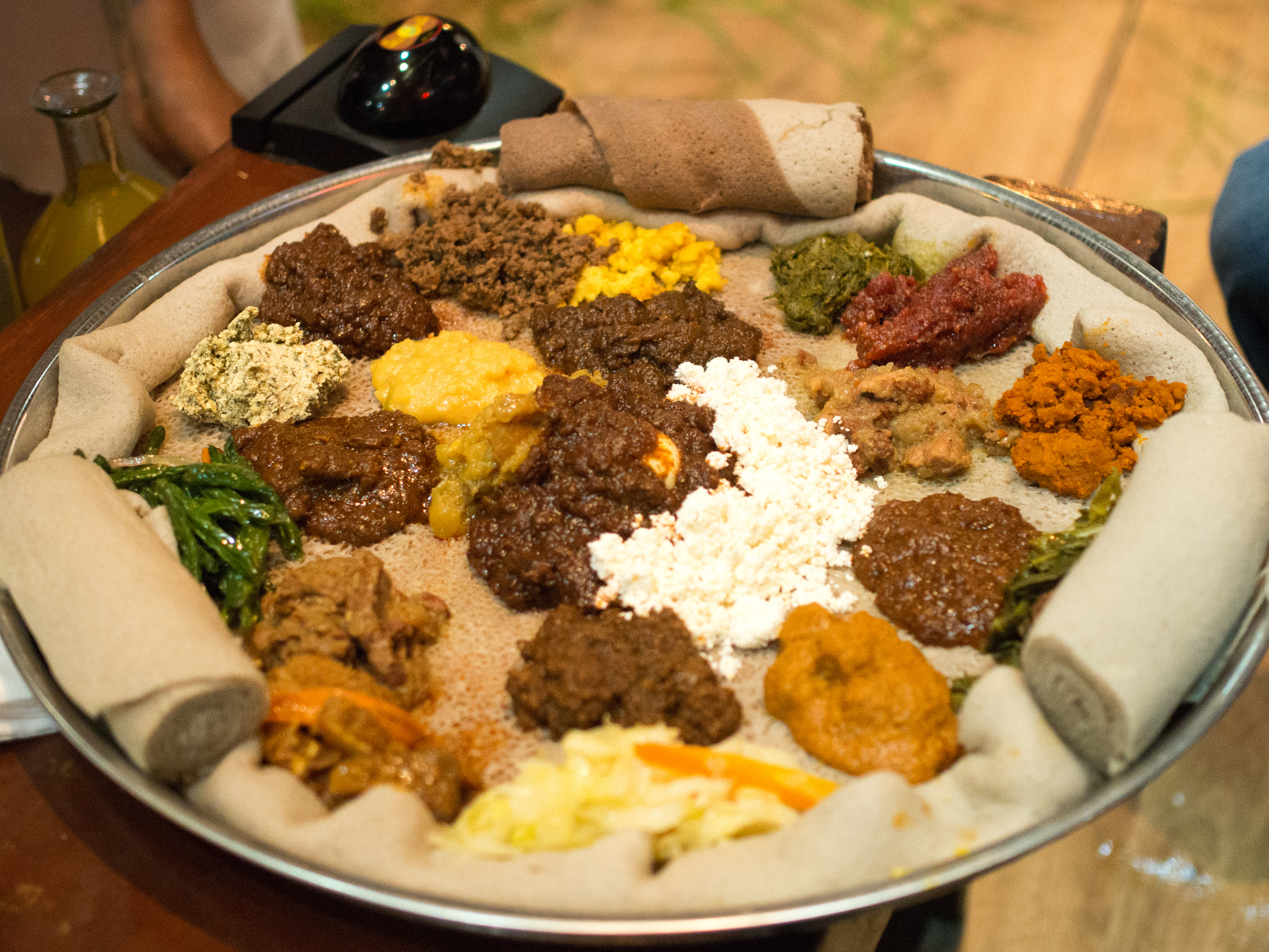
This meal, consisting of injera and several kinds of wat (stew), is typical of Ethiopian and Eritrean cuisine.

Central African cuisine connects with all major regions of sub-Saharan Africa: Its cuisine reflects that. Ugali and fufu are eaten in the region. Central African cuisine is very starchy and spicy hot. Dominant crops include plantains, cassava, peanuts, chillis, and okra. Meats include beef, chicken, and sometimes exotic meats called bushmeat (antelope, warthog, crocodile). Widespread spicy hot fish cuisine is one of the differentiating aspects. Mushroom is sometimes used as a meat substitute.

Traditional Southern African cuisine surrounds meat. Traditional society typically focused on raising sheep, goats, and especially cattle. Dishes include braai (barbecue meat), sadza, bogobe, pap (fermented cornmeal), milk products (buttermilk, yoghurt). Crops utilised are sorghum, maize (corn), pumpkin beans, leafy greens, and cabbage. Beverages include ting (fermented sorghum or maize), milk, chibuku (milky beer). Influences from the Indian and Malay communities can be seen in its use of curries, sambals, pickled fish, fish stews, chutney, and samosa. European influences can be seen in cuisines like biltong (dried beef strips), potjies (stews of maize, onions, tomatoes), French wines, and crueler or koeksister (sugar syrup cookie).

=== Sports ===
Football (soccer) is the most popular sport in sub-Saharan Africa. Sub-Saharan men are its main patrons. Major competitions include the African Champions League, a competition for the best clubs on the continent and the Confederation Cup, a competition primarily for the national cup winner of each African country. The Africa Cup of Nations is a competition of 16 national teams from various African countries held every two years. South Africa hosted the 2010 FIFA World Cup, a first for a sub-Saharan country. In 2010, Cameroon played in the World Cup for the sixth time, which is the current record for a sub-Saharan team. In 1996 Nigeria won the Olympic gold for football. In 2000 Cameroon maintained the continent's supremacy by winning the title too. Momentous achievements for sub-Saharan African football. Famous sub-Saharan football stars include Abedi Pele, Emmanuel Adebayor, George Weah, Michael Essien, Didier Drogba, Roger Milla, Nwankwo Kanu, Jay-Jay Okocha, Bruce Grobbelaar, Samuel Eto'o, Kolo Touré, Yaya Touré, Sadio Mané and Pierre-Emerick Aubameyang. The most talented sub-Saharan African football players find themselves courted and sought after by European leagues. There are currently more than 1000 Africans playing for European clubs. Sub-Saharan Africans have found themselves the target of racism by European fans. FIFA has been trying hard to crack down on racist outburst during games.

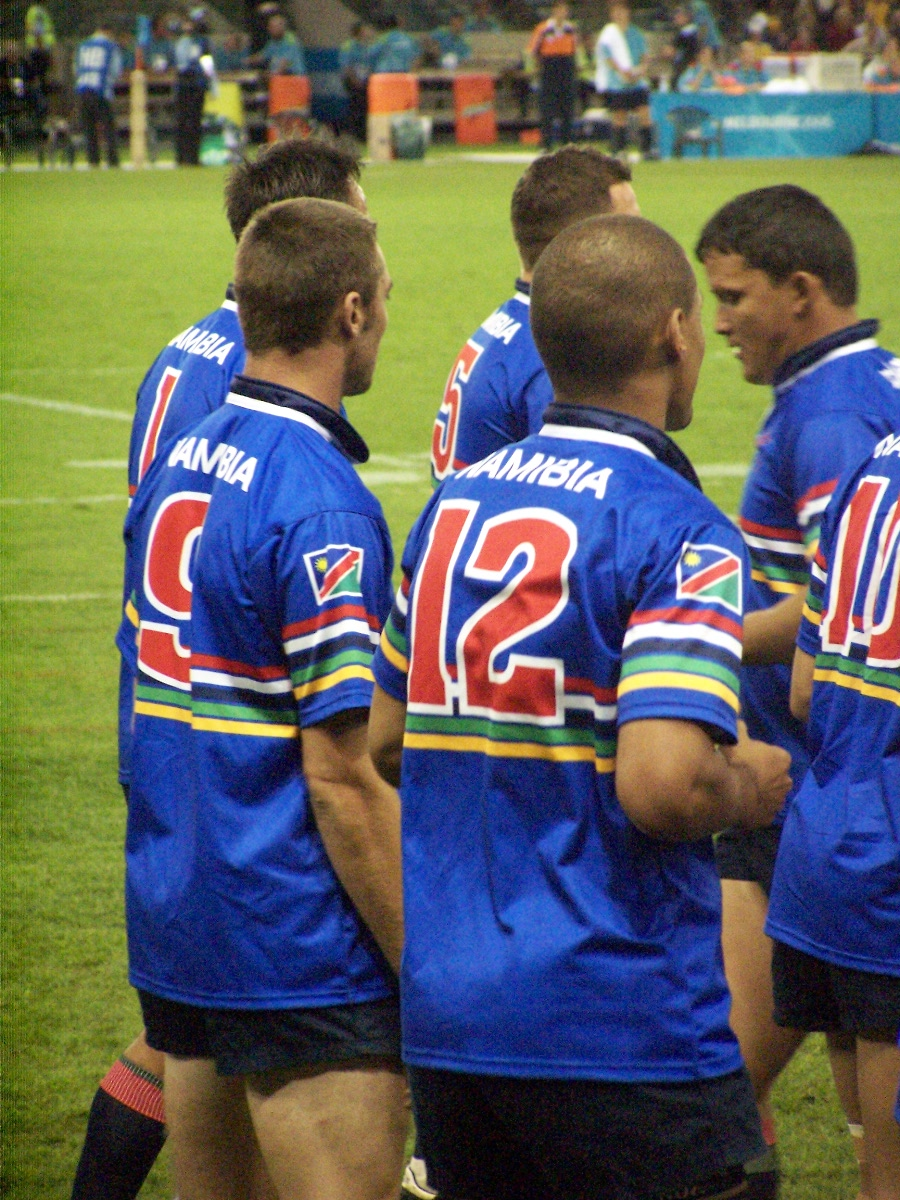
The Namibia rugby team

Rugby is popular in sub-Saharan Africa. The Confederation of African Rugby governs rugby games in the region. South Africa is a major force in the game and won the Rugby World Cup in 1995, 2007, 2019 and 2023. Africa is also allotted one guaranteed qualifying place in the Rugby World Cup.

Boxing is a popular sport. Battling Siki is the first world champion to come out of sub-Saharan Africa. Countries such as Nigeria, Ghana and South Africa have produced numerous professional world champions such as Dick Tiger, Hogan Bassey, Gerrie Coetzee, Samuel Peter, Azumah Nelson and Jake Matlala.

Cricket has a following. The African Cricket Association is an international body which oversees cricket in African countries. South Africa and Zimbabwe have their own governing bodies. In 2003 the Cricket World Cup was held in South Africa, first time it was held in sub-Saharan Africa.

Over the years, Ethiopia and Kenya have produced many notable long-distance athletes. Each country has federations that identify and cultivate top talent. Athletes from Ethiopia and Kenya hold, save for two exceptions, all the men's outdoor records for Olympic distance events from 800m to the marathon. Famous runners include Haile Gebrselassie, Kenenisa Bekele, Paul Tergat, and John Cheruiyot Korir.

== See also ==
- Aethiopia
- African diaspora
- Black people
- Geography of Africa
- History of Africa
