= Dinka Malual =

Nilotic ethnic group native to South Sudan

Jiɛ̈ɛ̈ŋ Malualgiërnyaŋ
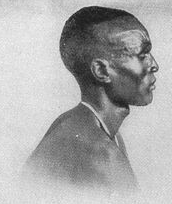
- Portrait of Dinka man

Total population
- 1,023,383 (Northern Bahr el Ghazal, 2017 estimate)

Regions with significant populations
- Northern Bahr el Ghazal, South Sudan

Languages
- Dinka Malual dialect

Religion
- Christianity, Indigenous beliefs

Related ethnic groups
- Dinka Rek, Other Dinka sub-groups

The Dinka Malual, also known as the Dinka Aweil, or Malual Tueng (Dinka: malual tueŋ), or just Malualjeernyang (Dinka: Malualgiɛrnyaŋ) are the largest subgroup of the Dinka people. They reside primarily in the Northern Bahr el Ghazal region of South Sudan, particularly around Aweil. They are part of the larger Nilotic ethnic group and are known for their pastoralist lifestyle, rich cultural heritage, and historical resilience.

== History ==
The Dinka Malual have traditionally lived in the floodplains of Bahr el Ghazal, characterized by seasonal rivers and pastures suitable for cattle grazing. They faced many challenges, including displacement during the Second Sudanese Civil War and conflicts with neighboring groups such as the Baqqara Arabs.

The Dinka Malual have faced significant challenges, including the Malual Dinka-Baqqara border conflict, which impacted national integration and local stability. Climate change, cattle raids, and displacement due to civil war affected their traditional way of life.

== Culture ==
Dinka Malual society is organized into clans and lineages. Elders play a significant role in governance and conflict resolution.

They speak a dialect of the Dinka language, part of the Nilotic language family.

Their traditional beliefs include the worship of a high god, Nhialic, alongside more recent Christianity.

== Economy ==
The Dinka Malual's economy is primarily based on animal husbandry, agriculture, and fishing. Aweil Dinka cattle are notable for their smaller, finer build compared to other Dinka breeds.

== Peace efforts ==
Peace initiatives, such as the Misseriya-Dinka Malual Peace Conference, supported by the United Nations Missions in South Sudan, aimed to foster dialogue and reconciliation, addressing long-standing conflicts and promoting peaceful coexistence.
