= Mathiang =

Mathiang (brown in Dinka) may refer to:

- Mathiang, South Sudan, a boma in Jonglei State, South Sudan
- Mathiang Anyoor (Brown caterpillar), a Dinka-affiliated militia group in South Sudan

== People ==
- Mangok Mathiang (born 1992), Australian-Sudanese basketball player for Hapoel Eilat of the Israeli Basketball Premier League
- Mathiang Yak Anek (fl. 19th century), female Dinka chief and escaped slave
- Mathiang Mathiang (born 1994), South Sudanese footballer
- Mathiang Muo (born 1987), Australian-Sudanese basketball player
