= Nilotic peoples =

Collection of ethnic groups indigenous to Nile Valley in East Africa

Nilotes
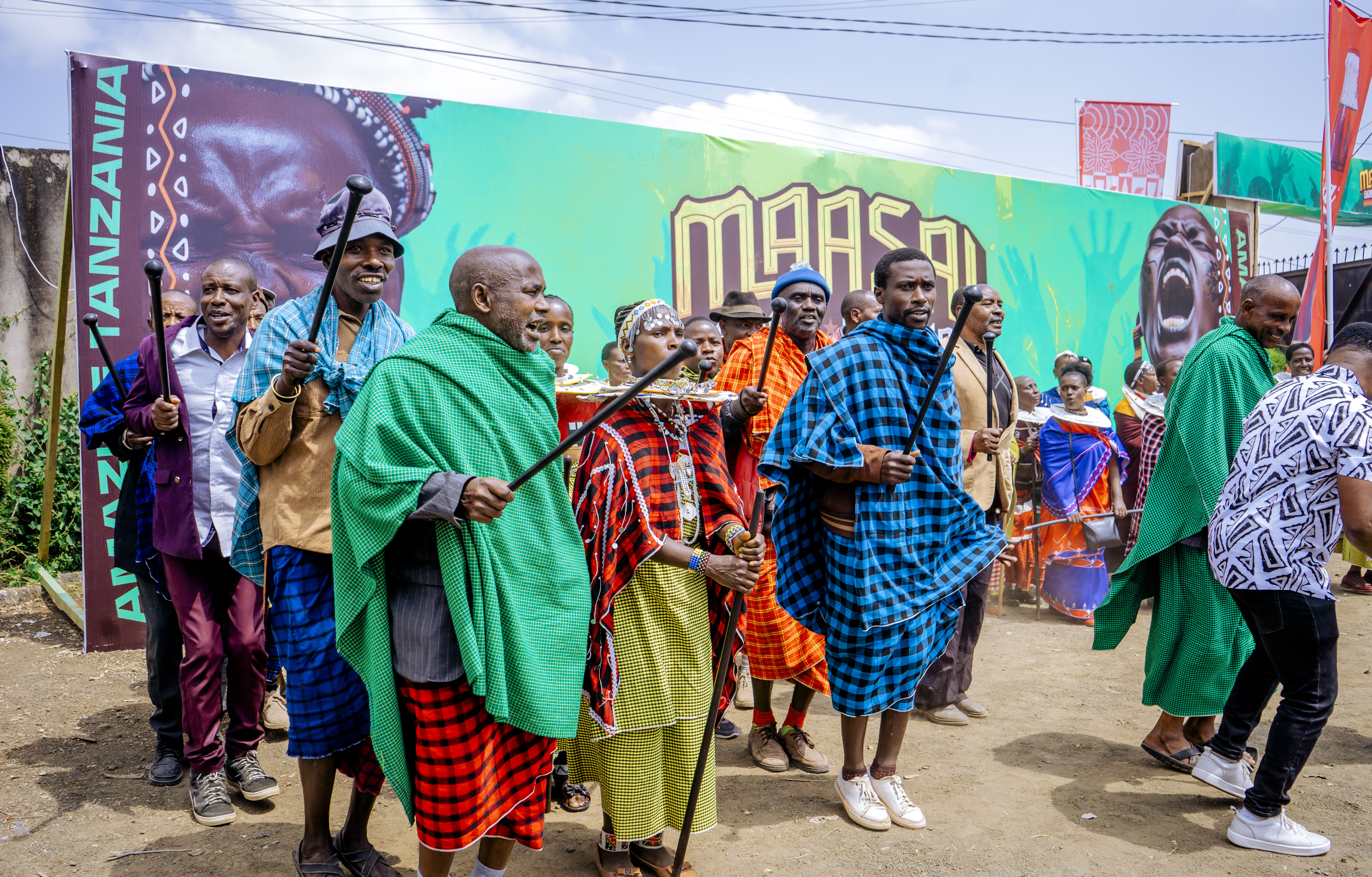
- Traditional Maasai dance at a Maasai global Festival, Tanzania

Regions with significant populations
- Kenya: 14.4 million (2019)
- Uganda: 10.9 million (2025)
- South Sudan: c. 7 - 9.6 million
- Tanzania: c. 3.2 million
- DRC: c. 2.2 million
- Ethiopia: c. 1 million
- Sudan: Unknown

Languages
- Nilotic languages

Religion
- Christianity, Traditional faiths, Kalenjin folklore, Dinka religion, Islam

Related ethnic groups
- other Nilo-Saharan-speaking peoples, Cushitic peoples

The Nilotic people are people indigenous to South Sudan and the Nile Valley who speak Nilotic languages. They inhabit South Sudan and the Gambela Region of Ethiopia, while also being a large minority in Kenya, Uganda, the northern area of Democratic Republic of the Congo, and Tanzania. The Nilotic people consist of the Dinka, the Nuer, the Shilluk, the Luo peoples, the Alur, the Anuak, the Ateker peoples, the Kalenjin people and the Karamojong people also known as the Karamojong or Karimojong, Ngasa people, Datooga, and the Maa-speaking peoples. Each of the ethnic groups mentioned have distinct languages, ethnic origins, and migration history, so the grouping under the name Nilotic or Nilotes is anthropologically contentious.

The Nilotes constitute the majority of the population in South Sudan while constituting a substantial minority in the countries of Uganda, Tanzania and Kenya. They make up a notable part of the population of North eastern Democratic Republic of Congo as well. Nilotic people are believed to number 50 million in the 21st century.

Physically, Nilotes are noted for their typically very dark skin color and lean, and occasionally tall bodies. They often possess exceptionally long limbs, particularly their distal segments (forearms, lower legs).

The Nilotic people primarily adhere to Christianity and traditional beliefs, with the majority of them being Christians. A small minority of Nilotes practice the religion of Islam.

== Name ==
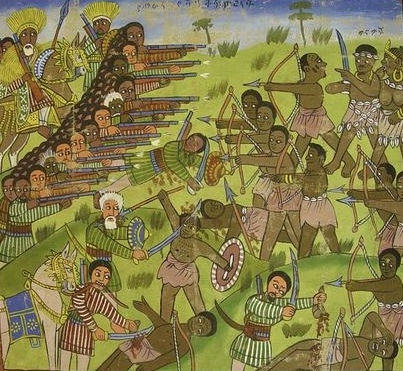
Ethiopian painting on cotton cloth depicting a battle between the "Amhara and the Shanqella," British Museum, 1920

The term Nilotic was used by a Church of England's clergyman named Thomas Gataker in mid to late 1600s.

The terms "Nilotic" and "Nilote"' were previously used as racial subclassifications, based on anthropological observations of the supposed distinct body morphology of many Nilotic speakers. Twentieth-century social scientists have largely discarded such efforts to classify peoples according to physical characteristics, in favor of using linguistic studies to distinguish among peoples. They formed ethnicities and cultures based on a shared language. Since the late 20th century, however, social and physical scientists are making use of data from population genetics.

Nilotic and Nilote are now mainly used to refer to the various disparate people who speak languages in the same Nilotic language family. Etymologically, the terms Nilotic and Nilote (singular nilot) derive from the Nile Valley; specifically, the Upper Nile and its tributaries, where most Sudanese Nilo-Saharan-speaking people live.

== Ethnic and linguistic divisions ==
=== Languages ===
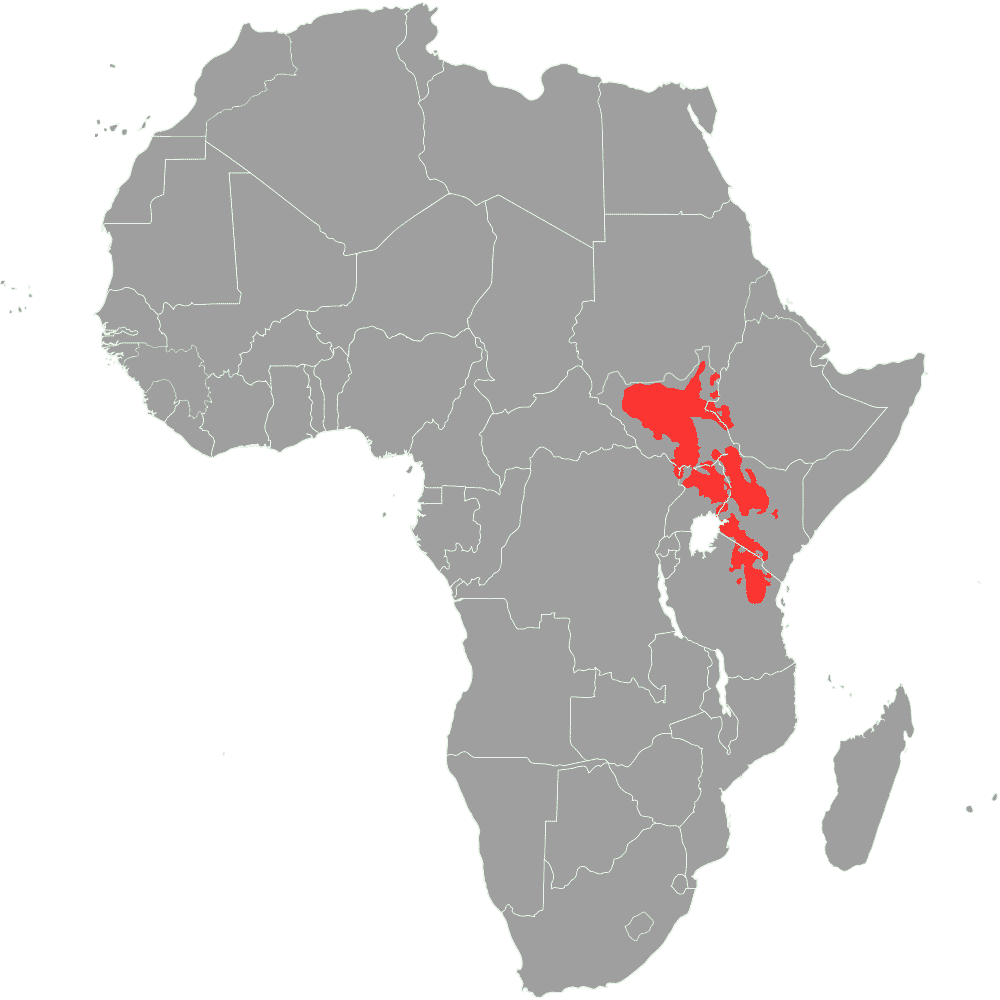
Areas where Nilotic languages are spoken

Linguistically, Nilotic is divided into three subgroups:

- Eastern Nilotic – Spoken by Nilotic populations in southwestern Ethiopia, eastern South Sudan, northeastern Uganda, western Kenya, and northern Tanzania, it includes languages such as Turkana and Maasai.
  - Bari-Kuku-Kakwa-Pojulu-Mundari-Nyangwara-Nyepo and others
  - Teso–Lotuko–Maa
- Southern Nilotic – Spoken by Nilotic populations in western Kenya, northern Tanzania, and eastern Uganda, it includes Kalenjin and Datog.
  - Kalenjin
  - Omotik-Datooga
- Western Nilotic – Spoken by Nilotic populations in South Sudan, Sudan, northeastern Congo (DRC), northern Uganda, southwestern Kenya, northern Tanzania, and southwestern Ethiopia, it includes the Dinka-Nuer languages, Luo languages, and the Burun languages.
  - Dinka–Nuer-Atwot
  - Luo languages
  - Burun languages

=== Ethnic groups ===
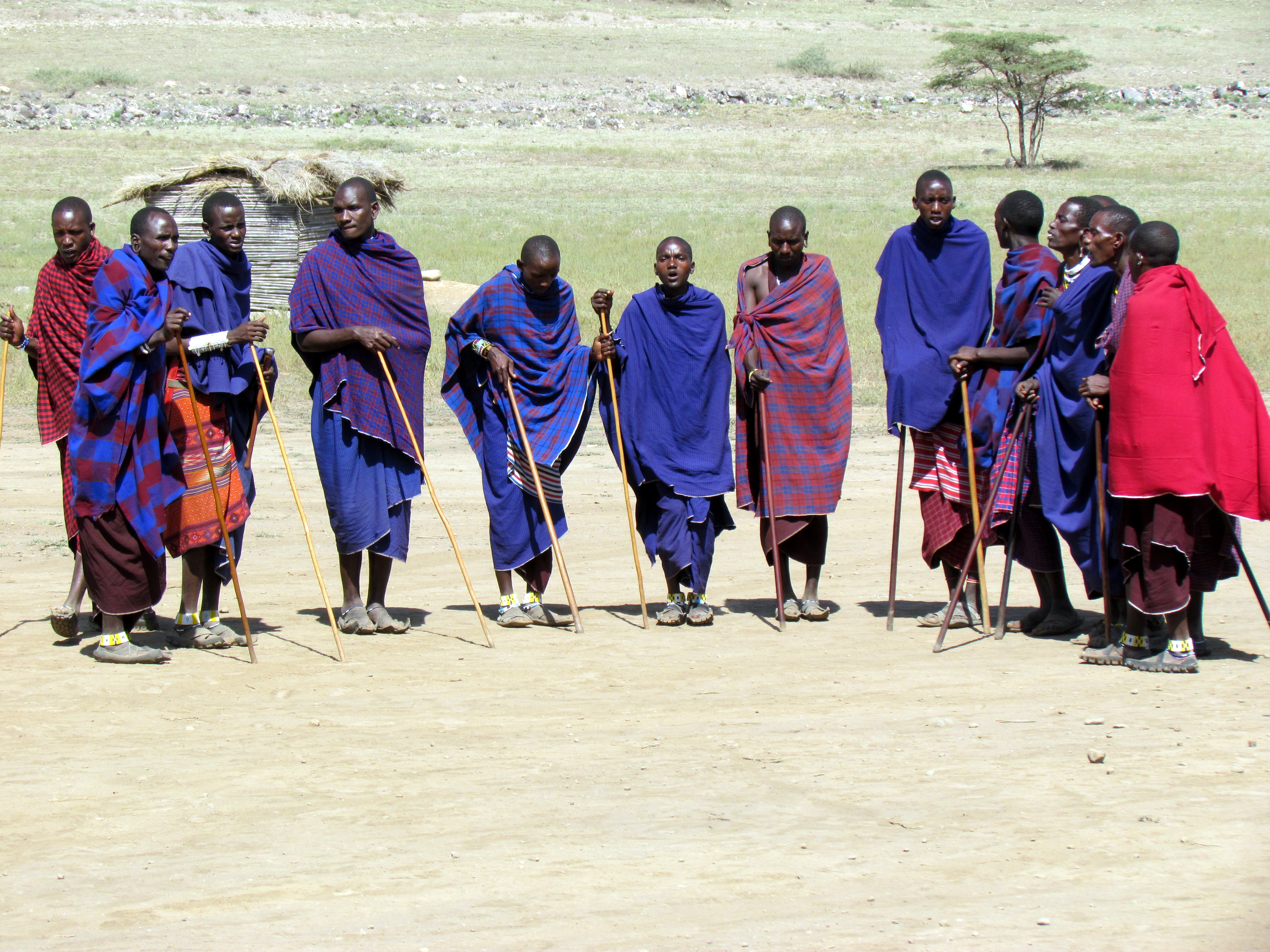
Maasai men in Ngorongoro, Tanzania

Nilotic people constitute the bulk of the population of South Sudan. The largest of the South Sudanese Nilotic peoples are the Dinka, who have as many as 25 ethnic subdivisions. The next-largest groups are the Nuer, followed by the Shilluk.

Nilotic people in Uganda includes the Luo peoples (Acholi, Alur, Adhola), the Ateker peoples (Iteso, Kumam, Karamojong, Lango people who despite speaking a mixture of Luo words, have Atekere origins, Sebei, and Kakwa).

In East Africa, the Nilotes are often subdivided into three general groups:

- The Plain Nilotes speak Maa languages and include the Maasai, Samburu, and Turkana peoples
- The River Lake Nilotes include the Joluo (Kenyan Luo), who are part of the larger Luo group
- The Highland Nilotes are subdivided into two groups, the Kalenjin and the Datog.
  - Kalenjin: Elgeyo, Kipsigis, Marakwet, Nandi, Pokot, Sabaot, Lembus, Terik and Tugen [Keiyo]
  - Datog: represented mainly by the Barabaig and small clusters of other Datog speakers

== History ==
=== Origins ===
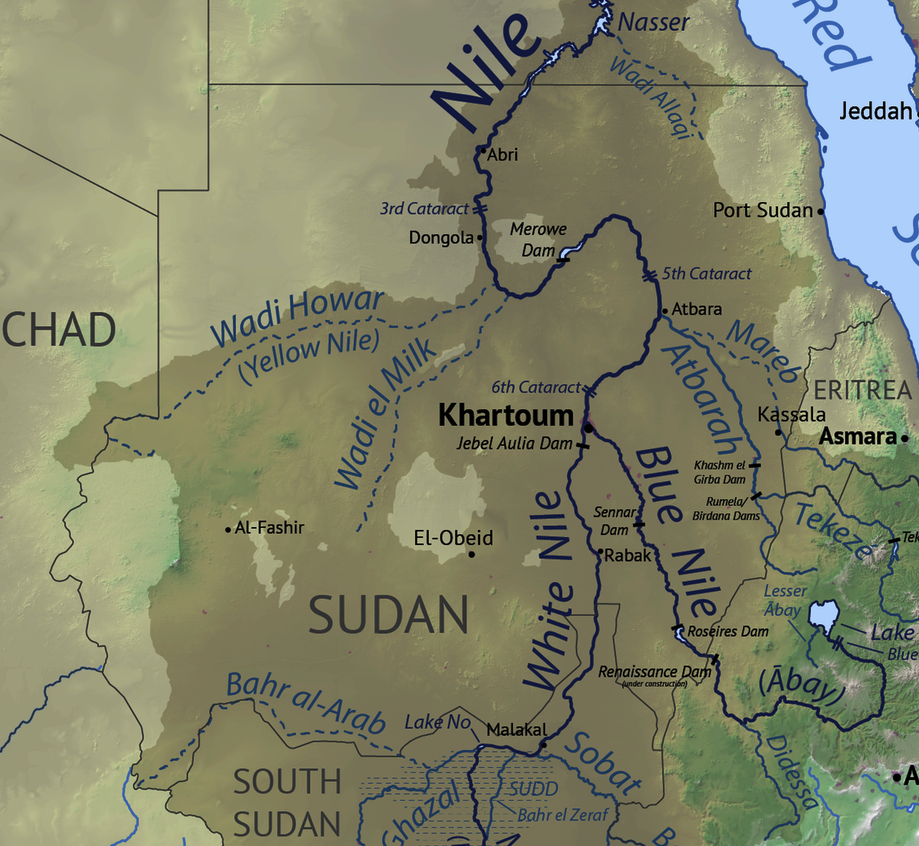
Map of Nile tributaries in modern Sudan

Archaeological evidence from the Lower Wadi Howar—a now-extinct river system that once flowed west of the Nile—points to the presence of mobile pastoralist communities during the Mid-Holocene (c. 6000–4000 BCE). These groups practiced cattle herding, fishing, and limited agriculture, and exhibited strong cultural links with pre-Kerma societies of the Nubian Nile Valley. Artifacts such as herringbone-incised pottery, cattle burials, and signs of long-distance trade suggest their integration into a broader Eastern Sudanic cultural sphere. As the Sahara underwent increasing aridification after 4000 BCE, these populations gradually migrated eastward and southward into the Nile Valley and White Nile basin, laying early demographic and cultural foundations for what would become the Nilotic-speaking peoples.

=== Proto-Nilotic ===
Contemporaneous with pre-dynastic Egyptian developments down the Nile, the formation of a proto-Nilotic identity—distinct from an earlier, broader Eastern Sudanic unity—is thought to have emerged by the third millennium BCE, likely in connection with the rise of pastoralism. Linguistic models propose that this unity occurred east of the Nile, in what is now South Sudan. However, this is complicated by archaeological evidence placing culturally Nilotic populations firmly within the Nile Valley—from Kadero to Meroë—by the early third millennium BCE, suggesting a wider and more integrated presence.

Composed of varied distinct identities, they were commonly collectively referred to as the Nehesy (southerners) by the ancient Egyptians, Aethiopians by the Greeks and Cushi (Cushites or Kushites) by the Israelites, a term that possibly derived from their own name for themselves.

These communities likely contributed to the development of major civilizations such as the Kingdom of Kush—including Kerma, Napata, and Meroë—and the later Christian kingdoms of Makuria, Nobatia, and Alodia. Genetic and archaeological studies indicate that Nubians were originally a population closely related to Nilotic groups, who later received gene flow from Middle Eastern and East African populations.

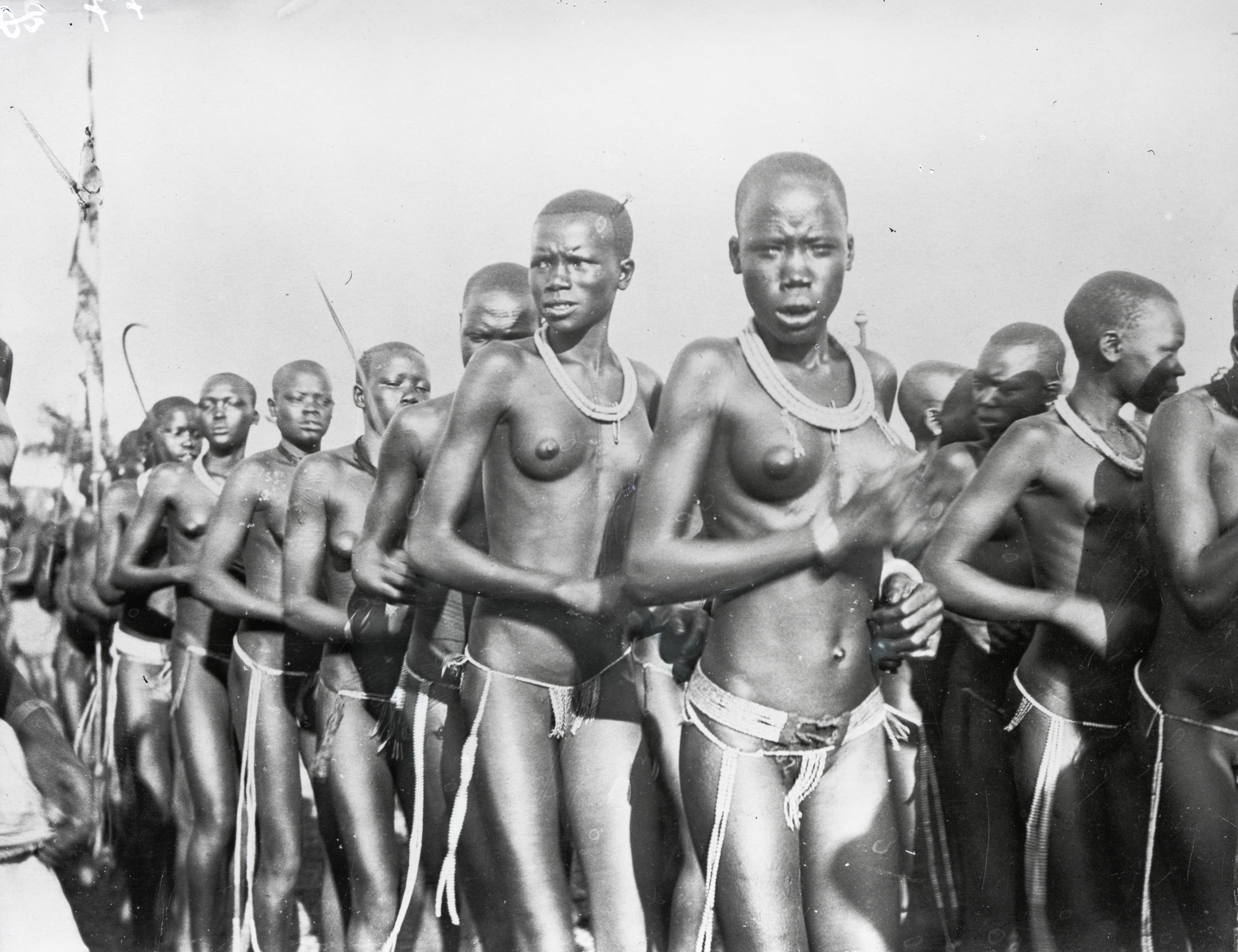
Nuer women in Sudan, 1930

One of the earliest known archaeological sites associated with a pastoralist culture bearing Nilotic characteristics is Kadero, located about 48 km north of modern Khartoum, on the east bank of the Nile just upstream from the confluence with the Blue Nile. Dating to around 3000 BCE, Kadero reveals a cattle-herding society that also practiced seed cultivation and fishing. The site contains burial remains with distinct sub-Saharan African features and evidence of long-distance trade, artistry, and mixed subsistence strategies—an economic pattern still observed among later Nilotic groups.

=== Antiquity ===
By the 2nd century, descriptions in Ptolemy's Geography (c. 150 CE), situates a group called the Memnones between the Nile and the Blue Nile (Astapos), near the region of Meroë. Classical authors often associated this area with mythic "Ethiopians" or descendants of Memnon—a Homeric figure representing powerful peoples of the Upper Nile. The term Ethiopians (historically denoting dark skinned Africans) and their geographic placement in the text overlaps with the historical peoples and heartland of early Nilotic-speaking populations. The Nubei (or Nuba) at this time appear only on the periphery of this world, contrasting with the more central Memnones, a group bearing the name of Memnon, the mythic Ethiopian king of Trojan War fame. Their prominence—both mythological and geographic—suggests that they may reflect a residual Kushite aristocracy, remembered or mythologized in the Greco-Roman imagination. Though speculative, the group Ptolemy names the Sapaei, situated south of the Memnones between the Nile and the Astapos (Blue Nile), may correspond to early Nilotic populations ancestral to the southern Nilotes. Their described location—likely within modern South Sudan—lies approximately 700–800 km north of Mount Elgon, in a south-southwesterly direction. Ethnographic accounts consistently identify the Mount Elgon region (Tulwet ab Kony) as a pivotal ancestral waypoint in the migration of Southern Nilotic-speaking peoples into Kenya. Among the Kalenjin, Mount Elgon and its residents is sometimes referred to as Kapkugo, meaning "grandparents' place," reflecting its status in cultural memory as an ancestral homeland. The Kalenjin communities living around Elgon—particularly the Sabaot—have historically been grouped under the term Sebei, used in both Ugandan and Kenyan contexts to refer to the Nilotic highland peoples of the area. Similarly, a recurring myth among Tatoga sub-tribes describes a homeland on a high mountain—Endabesht—overlooking two great lakes, widely interpreted as Lake Victoria and Lake Turkana. The memory captured in the name of the town - Endebess, one of the towns nearest to Mount Elgon in Kenya.

=== Expansion out of central Sudan ===
Between the 5th and 11th centuries CE, Nilotic-speaking groups began expanding southward from central Sudanese regions such as the Gezira into what is now South Sudan. This movement took place during a time of major political and cultural shifts across the Nile Valley. Even as late as the 4th century, the ancient Kushite kingdom still exerted influence in Lower Nubia, as seen in a joint embassy of Ethiopians (Kushites) and Blemmyes (Beja) to Emperor Constantine around AD 336. But by the 5th century, Kushite political structures had collapsed, creating a power vacuum in the region.

The Nilotic migrations gained momentum in the 11th century, coinciding with the arrival of Arab traders in central Sudan. Although these later migrations significantly predate the collapse of the Christian Nubian kingdoms of Makuria and Alodia (around 1500 CE), they occur after early contact with Arabs (c.9-10 century), a contact that may have introduced new cultural and technological elements, such as humpless cattle breeds.

According to archaeologist Roland Oliver, this same period also marks the emergence of the Iron Age among Nilotic groups. The combination of declining older polities, incoming lifeways and technologies, and internal cultural developments may have created the conditions that allowed or perhaps coerced Nilotic-speaking peoples to expand and adapt to regions further south.

=== Expansion into East Africa ===
Following their expansion across South Sudan during the first millennium CE, Nilotic-speaking pastoralists began settling further east into the highlands and Rift Valley of what is now Kenya and northern Tanzania. This movement, which accelerated from the 13th century onward, corresponds with the emergence of the Pastoral Iron Age in East Africa—a transformative period marked by new forms of livestock management, iron technology, and territorial consolidation.

Genetic studies of ancient remains from Kenya and Tanzania show that Pastoral Iron Age communities were distinct from their earlier Pastoral Neolithic predecessors. The latter were composed of approximately 40% Nilotic-related ancestry (similar to the Dinka), 40% ancestry from northeastern Africa (likely from the Horn or Levant), and 20% from indigenous foragers. By contrast, Pastoral Iron Age individuals show up to 60% Nilotic-related ancestry, indicating a renewed demographic and cultural expansion by Nilotic-speaking groups during this period.

These developments are reflected archaeologically in the rise of the Sirikwa culture (c.1200 to 1800 CE), a widespread agropastoral tradition centered on the Uasin Gishu plateau and surrounding western highlands. The Sirikwa economy emphasized dairying and seasonal herd mobility, supported by fortified settlements featuring distinctive cattle enclosures ("Sirikwa holes"), defensive gate systems, and irrigation features—pointing to a highly organized and sedentary pastoral society.

=== Shilluk ===
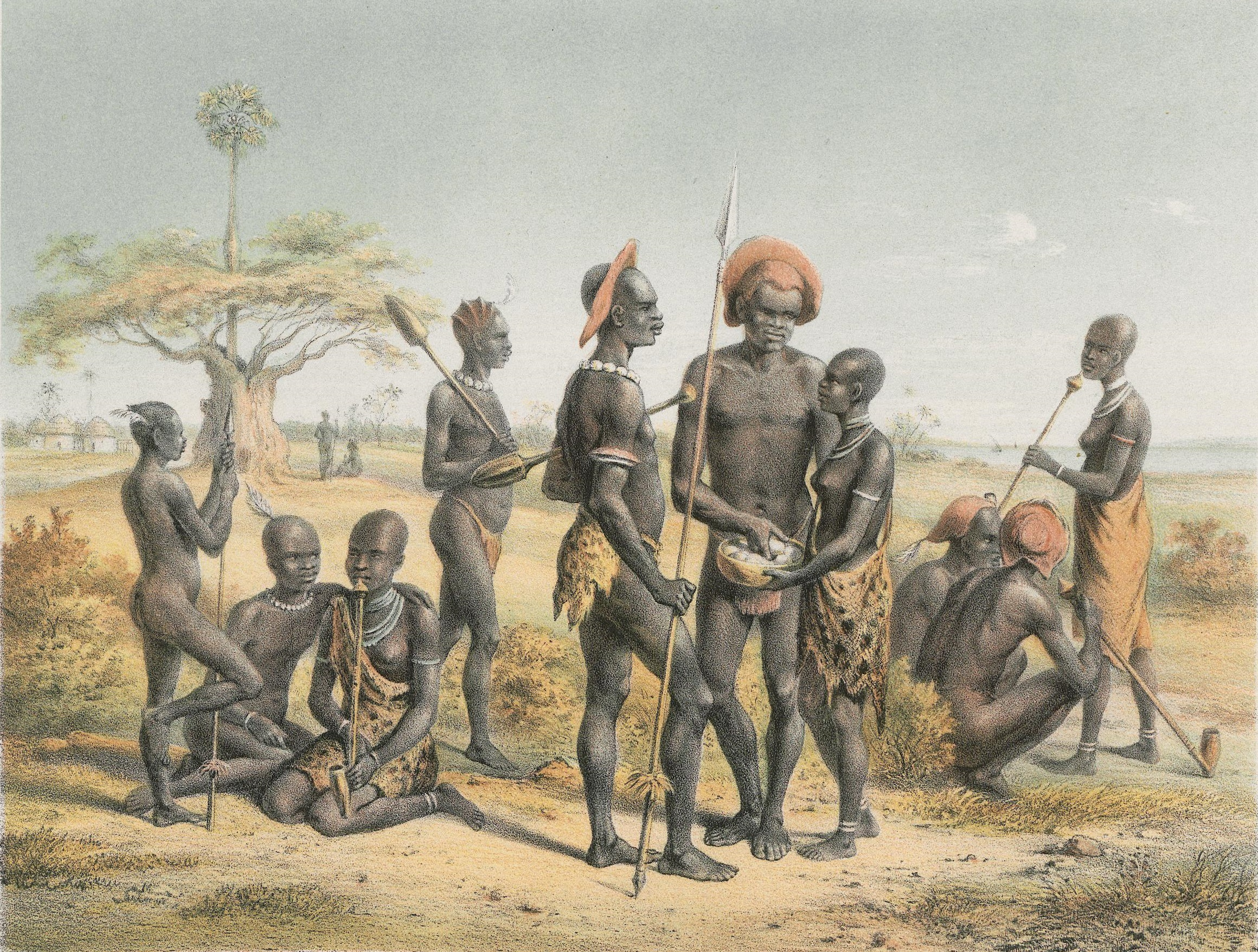
A group of Shilluk in around 1860

By the 16th century, the most powerful group among the Nilotic speakers were the Cøllø, called Shilluk by Arabs and Europeans, who spread east to the banks of the white Nile under the legendary leadership of Nyikang, who is said to have ruled Läg Cøllø c from around 1490 to 1517. The Cøllø gained control of the west bank of the river as far north as Kosti in Sudan. There they established an economy based on cattle raising, cereal farming, and fishing, with small villages located along the length of the river. The Cøllø developed an intensive system of agriculture. The Cøllø lands in the 17th century had a population density similar to that of the Egyptian Nile lands.

One theory is that pressure from the Cøllø drove the Funj people north, who would establish the Sultanate of Sennar. The Dinka remained in the Sudd area, maintaining their transhumance economy.

While the Dinka were protected and isolated from their neighbours, the Cøllø were more involved in international affairs. The Cøllø controlled the west bank of the White Nile, but the other side was controlled by the Funj sultanate, with regular conflict between the two. The Cøllø had the ability to quickly raid outside areas by war canoe, and had control of the waters of the Nile. The Funj had a standing army of armoured cavalry, and this force allowed them to dominate the plains of the sahel.

Cøllø traditions tell of Rädh Odak Ocollo who ruled around 1630 and led them in a three-decade war with Sennar over control of the White Nile trade routes. The Cøllø allied with the Sultanate of Darfur and the Kingdom of Takali against the Funj, but the capitulation of Takali ended the war in the Funj's favour. In the later 17th century, the Cøllø and Funj allied against the Dinka, who rose to power in the border area between the Funj and Cøllø.

The Cøllø political structure gradually centralized under the a king or reth. The most important is Rädh Tugø (son of Rädh Dhøköödhø) who ruled from circa 1690 to 1710 and established the Cøllø capital of Fashoda. The same period had the gradual collapse of the Funj sultanate, leaving the Cøllø in complete control of the White Nile and its trade routes. The Cøllø military power was based on control of the river.

Geographical barriers protected the southerners from Islam's advance, enabling them to retain their social and cultural heritage and their political and religious institutions. The Dinka people were especially secure in the Sudd marshlands, which protected them from outside interference, and allowed them to remain secure without a large armed forces. The Shilluk, Azande, and Bari people had more regular conflicts with neighbouring states.

=== Western Nilotic settlement in East Africa ===
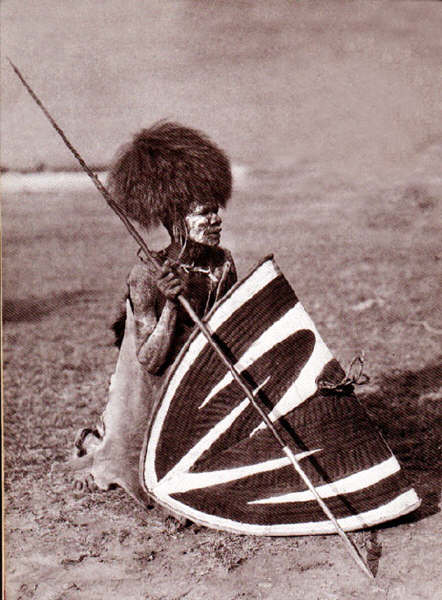
Luo warrior in Kenya, c. 1902

For various reasons, slow and multigenerational migrations of Nilotic Luo peoples occurred from South Sudan into Uganda and western Kenya from at least 1000 AD, and continuing until the early 20th century.

Oral history and genealogical evidence have been used to estimate timelines of Luo expansion into and within Kenya and Tanzania. Four major waves of migrations into the former Nyanza province in Kenya are discernible starting with the people of Jok (Joka Jok), which is estimated to have begun around 1490–1517.

Joka Jok were the first and largest wave of migrants into northern Nyanza. These migrants settled at a place called Ramogi Hill, then expanded around northern Nyanza. The people of Owiny' (Jok'Owiny) and the people of Omolo (Jok'Omolo) followed soon after (1598–1625).

A miscellaneous group composed of the Suba, Sakwa, Asembo, Uyoma, and Kano then followed. The Suba originally were Bantu-speaking people who assimilated into Luo culture. They fled from the Buganda Kingdom in Uganda after the civil strife that followed the murder of the 24th Kabaka of Buganda in the mid-18th century and settled in South Nyanza, especially at Rusinga and Mfangano islands. Luo speakers crossed Winam Gulf of Lake Victoria from northern Nyanza into South Nyanza starting in the early 17th century.

=== Eastern Nilotic settlement in East Africa ===
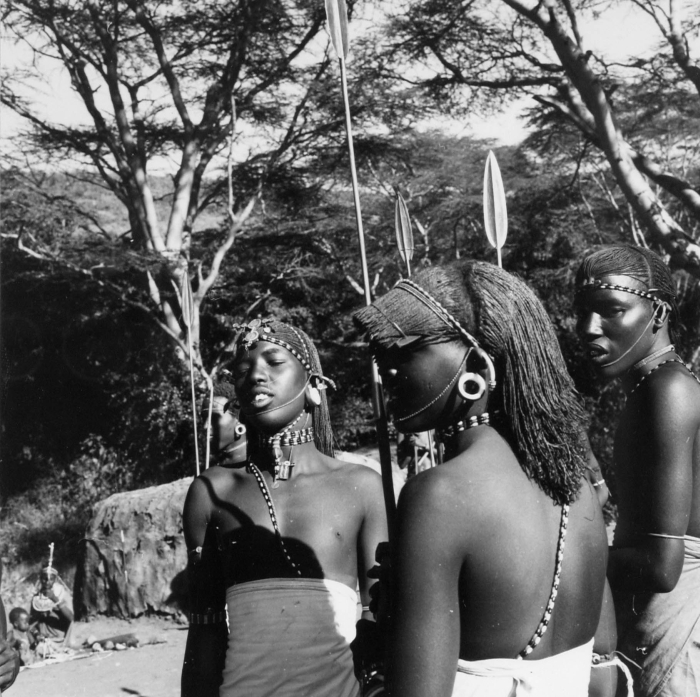
Samburu warriors, 1973

The Maasai inhabit the African Great Lakes region and arrived via South Sudan. Most Nilotic speakers in the area, including the Maasai, the Turkana and the Kalenjin, are pastoralists and have a reputation as fearsome warriors and cattle rustlers. The Maasai and other groups in East Africa have adopted customs and practices from neighbouring Cushitic-speaking groups, including the age-set system of social organisation, circumcision, and vocabulary terms.

Many ethnic groups that had already formed settlements in the region were forcibly displaced by the incoming Maasai. Other, mainly Southern Cushitic groups, were assimilated into Maasai society. The Nilotic ancestors of the Kalenjin likewise absorbed some early Cushitic populations.

The Maasai territory reached its largest size in the mid-19th century and covered almost all of the Great Rift Valley and adjacent lands from Mount Marsabit in the north to Dodoma in the south. At this time the Maasai, as well as the larger Nilotic group they were part of, raised cattle as far east as the Tanga coast in Tanganyika (now mainland Tanzania). Raiders used spears and shields but were most feared for throwing clubs (orinka) which could be accurately thrown from up to 70 paces (approx. 100 metres). In 1852, there was a report of a concentration of 800 Maasai warriors on the move in what is now Kenya. In 1857, after having depopulated the "Wakuafi wilderness" in what is now southeastern Kenya, Maasai warriors threatened Mombasa on the Kenyan coast.

Because of this migration, the Maasai are the southernmost Nilotic speakers.

=== Southern Nilotic settlement in East Africa ===
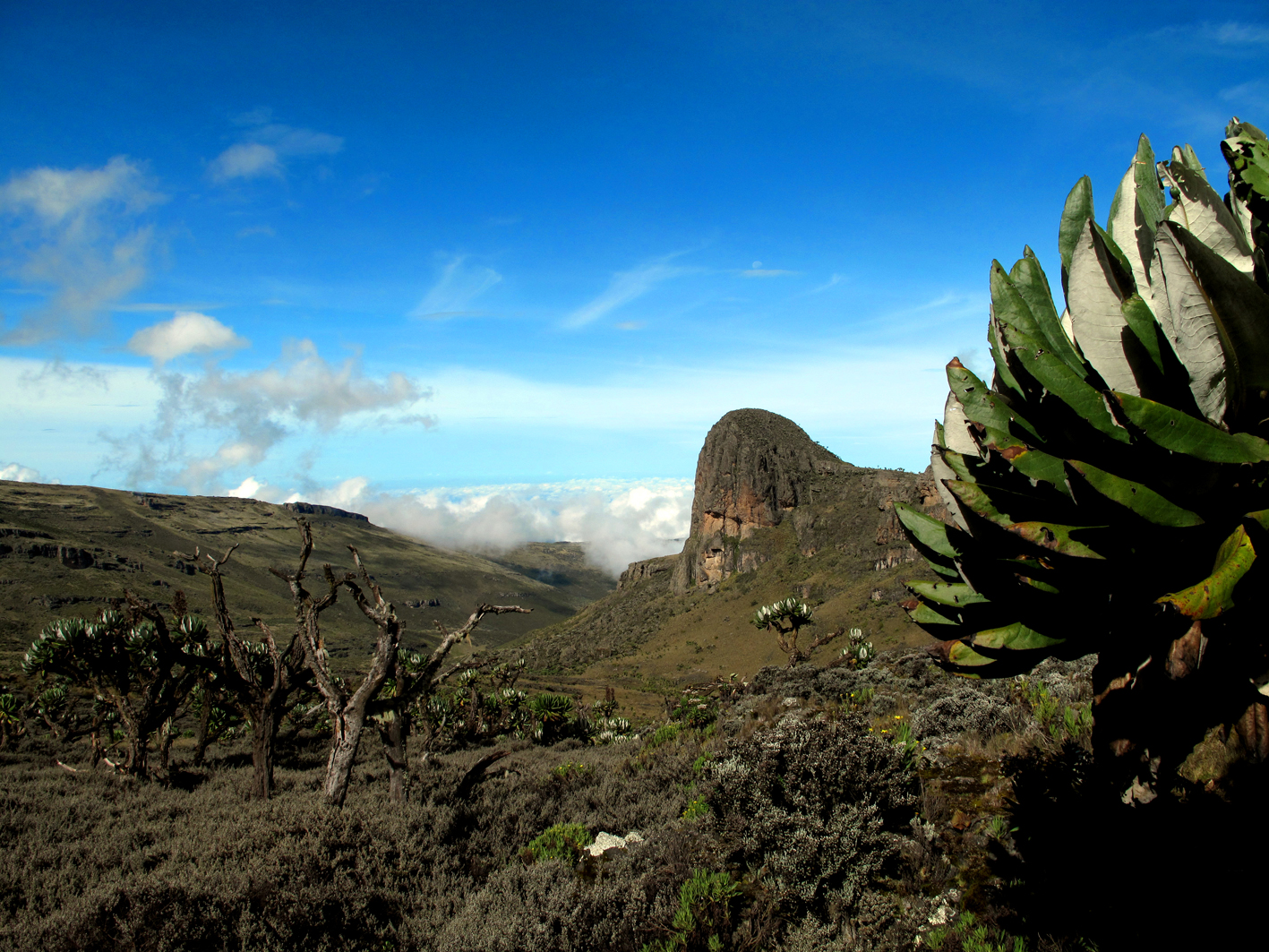
Mount Elgon, referred by Kalenjin as Tulwop Kony, a common Kalenjin point of origin

Starting in the mid-19th century, European anthropologists and later Kenyan historians have been interested in the origins of human migration from various parts of Africa into East Africa. One of the more notable broad-based theories emanating from these studies includes the Bantu expansion. The main tools of study have been linguistics, archaeology and oral traditions.

The significance of tracing individual clan histories in order to get an idea of Kalenjin groups formation has been shown by scholars such as B.E. Kipkorir (1978). He argued that the Tugen first settled in small clan groups, fleeing from war, famine, and disease, and that they arrived from western, eastern, and northern sections. Even a section among the Tugen claims to have come from Mount Kenya.

The Nandi account on the settlement of Nandi displays a similar manner of occupation of the Nandi territory. The Kalenjin clans who moved into and occupied the Nandi area, thus becoming the Nandi tribe, came from a wide array of Kalenjin-speaking areas.

Apparently, spatial core areas existed to which people moved and concentrated over the centuries, and in the process evolved into the individual Kalenjin communities known today by adopting migrants and assimilating original inhabitants.

Several early ethnographic accounts from the various Kalenjin sub tribes point to Tulwetab/Tulwop Kony (Mount Elgon) as their original point of settlement in Kenya. This point of origin appears as a central theme in most narratives recorded after the colonial period. One of the more famous accounts states:

... The Kalenjin originated from a country in the north known as Emet ab Burgei, which means, the warm country. The people are said to have traveled southwards passing through Mount Elgon or Tulwet ab Kony in Kalenjin. The Sabaot settled around the slopes of the mountain while the others travelled on in search of better land. The Keiyo and Marakwet settled in Kerio Valley and Cherangani Hills. The Pokot settled on the northern side of Mount Elgon and later spread to areas north of Lake Baringo. At Lake Baringo, the Tugen separated from the Nandi and the Kipsigis. This was during a famine known as Kemeutab Reresik, which means, famine of the bats. It is said that during this famine a bat brought blades of green grass which was taken as a sign of good omen signifying that famine could be averted through movement to greener pastures. The Tugen moved and settled around Tugen Hills while the Kipsigis and the Lembus Nandi moved to Rongai area. The Kipsigis and Nandi are said to have lived as a united group for a long time but eventually were forced to separate due to antagonistic environmental factors. Some of these were droughts and invasion of the Maasai from Uasin Gishu.

== Culture and religion ==
The culture of Nilotic peoples is diverse yet exhibits broad commonalities rooted in their shared linguistic and historical heritage. Nilotic cultures are traditionally pastoralist, with strong emphasis on cattle, age-grade systems, oral traditions, and spiritual practices. These cultures have adapted over time to a range of environments from the Nile Valley and the Sudd wetlands to the East African highlands and savannahs.

=== Social organization ===
Nilotic societies are traditionally organized along clan and lineage lines, often with a patrilineal descent system. Age-sets and initiation rituals structure communal life, conferring social responsibilities and identity. In many groups—such as the Maasai, Turkana, Nuer, and Dinka—age-set systems determine leadership, military roles, and generational continuity.

While political centralization varies, leadership is often distributed among councils of elders, ritual specialists, and in some cases, divine or semi-divine kings (e.g., among the Shilluk). Kinship ties remain crucial, and exogamous marriage practices reinforce alliances between clans or sections.

=== Livelihoods: cattle and cultivation ===
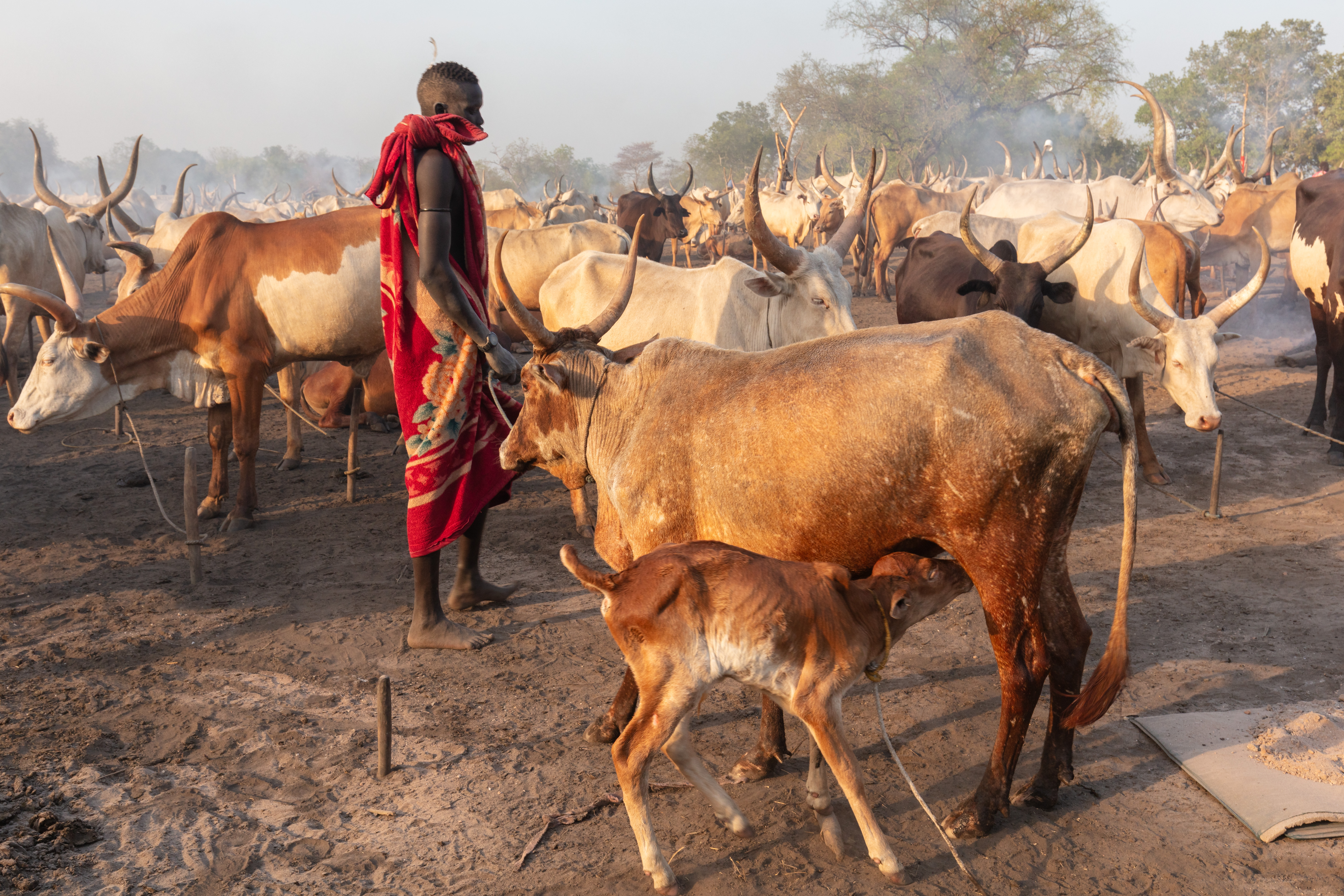
Cattle-herder in South Sudan

While Nilotic peoples are often described as pastoralists, most communities in fact maintain dual economies, combining livestock herding with subsistence agriculture. Cattle hold deep symbolic and ritual significance and many Nilotes today continue to practice pastoralism, migrating on a seasonal basis with their herds of livestock but crop cultivation remains equally essential to everyday survival. Some Nilotic communities are known for the practice of cattle raiding.

The deep historical roots of Nilotic agriculture may extend much further back than commonly assumed. In one particularly evocative passage, Pliny the Elder (Naturalis Historia, ca. 77 CE) describes a people who "imbibe their drink through the stalk of the oat, which grows spontaneously and supplies them with its grain for food." This likely reflects a rudimentary form of wild grain exploitation or proto-cultivation—potentially one of the earliest Greco-Roman observations of forager-cultivators in eastern Sudan or South Sudan. While Nilotic traditions consistently emphasize sorghum as their ancestral grain, Pliny, unfamiliar with African cereals, likened it to the oat. His description—of a self-growing stalk used for both food and drink—closely matches sorghum, whose domestication and cultural significance are deeply rooted in Nilotic societies.

The Dinka (Jieng) of South Sudan are widely known for their cattle-centric culture, yet agriculture plays a significant, and often underappreciated, role in their livelihood. Sorghum is the staple crop, traditionally grown in family plots surrounding the homestead. Other crops include okra, sesame, pumpkin, cow peas, maize, cassava, groundnuts, beans, watermelons, millet, and tobacco. Both men and women engage in cultivation, with women often responsible for brewing sorghum beer and managing large gardens.

Among groups like the Jie of northeastern Uganda, sorghum is considered an ancient crop of divine origin. Elders maintain that "God created sorghum and cattle on the same day," underscoring its foundational role in Jie cosmology. Although other crops—such as maize, sim-sim (sesame), groundnuts, and sweet potatoes—are often regarded as more recent introductions (frequently attributed to contact with Lwo-speaking neighbors), they are cultivated to varying degrees, particularly by women. Scholars such as Gulliver and Dyson-Hudson have demonstrated that while agriculture and livestock are economically complementary, cattle dominate the ritual and sociopolitical spheres, which are traditionally controlled by men.

This pattern holds across other Nilotic groups. Evans-Pritchard, in his seminal ethnography of the Nuer, noted that "cattle are the thread that runs through Nuer institutions, language, rites of passage, politics, economy, and allegiances," yet he also documented their cultivation of millet and other crops during lean times.

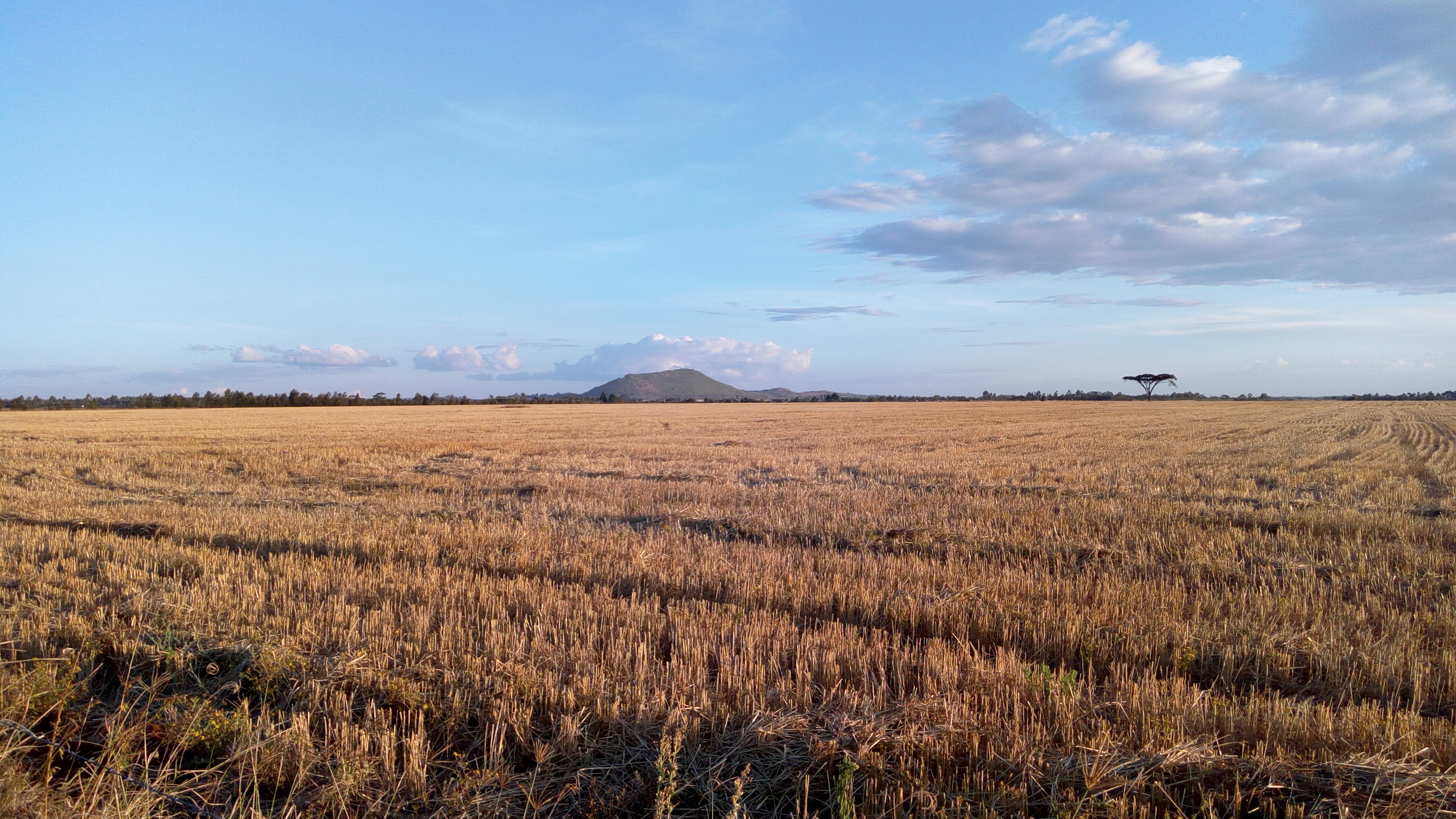
Wheat plantation in Uasin Gishu, Kenya

The Kalenjin, a Southern Nilotic group of the Kenyan highlands, also practice a semi-pastoral lifestyle, with both livestock herding and agriculture playing central roles. Their body of folklore contains within it the narrative of how they discovered sorghum grain cultivation. Today they are noted for being among the largest grain producers in the country.

This dual economy is often gendered: men primarily manage cattle, which confer prestige, political status, and ritual authority, while women tend to the fields, ensuring food security for the household. The cultural primacy of cattle, however, has historically shaped external perceptions, often obscuring the agricultural dimension of Nilotic life.

=== Religion and cosmology ===
In terms of religious beliefs, Nilotes primarily adhere to traditional faiths, Christianity and to a lesser extent Islam. Traditional Nilotic religions are typically monotheistic or henotheistic, centering around a high god associated with the sky or rain. For instance, the Dinka worship Nhialic, while the Nuer recognize Kwoth. Spirits of ancestors, nature deities, and other intermediary beings also play roles in ritual life.

The Dinka has a pantheon of deities that includes a Supreme, Creator God, Nhialic, who is the God of the sky and rain, and the ruler of all the spirits. He is believed to be present in all of creation and to control the destiny of every human, plant, and animal on Earth. Nhialic is also known as Jaak, Juong, or Dyokin by other Nilotic groups, such as the Nuer and Shilluk. Dengdit or Deng, is the sky God of rain and fertility, empowered by Nhialic.

Deng's mother is Abuk, the patron goddess of gardening and all women, represented by a snake. Garang, another deity, is believed or assumed by some Dinka to be a god suppressed by Deng. His spirits can cause most Dinka women, and some men, to scream. The term Jok refers to a group of ancestral spirits.

In Lotuko mythology, the chief God is called Ajok. He is generally seen as kind and benevolent, but can be angered. He once reportedly answered a woman's prayer for the resurrection of her son. Her husband, however, was angry and killed the child. According to the Lotuko religion, Ajok was annoyed by the man's actions and swore never to resurrect any Lotuko again. As a result, death was said to have become permanent.

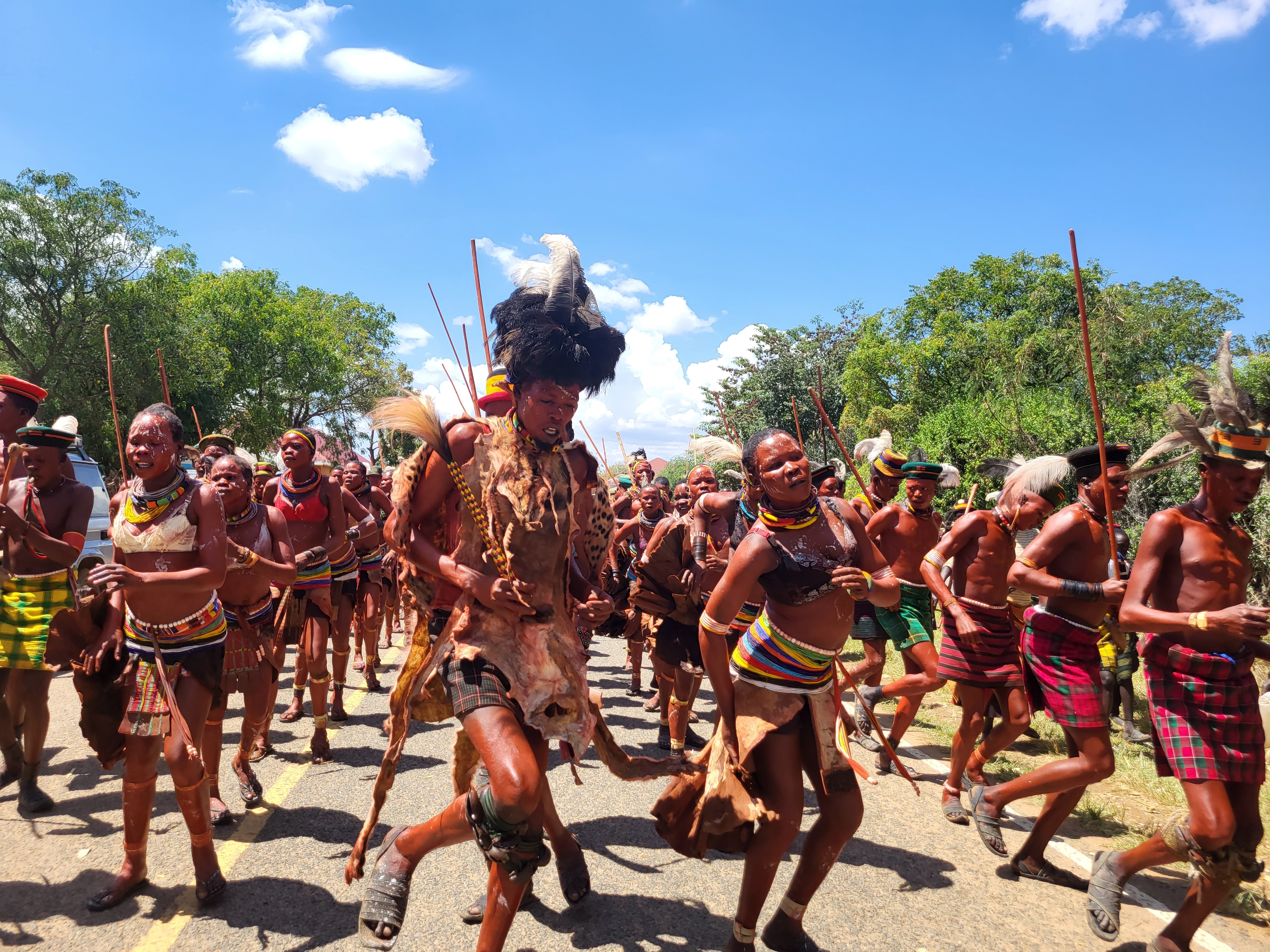
The annual Karamojong cultural festival

Ritual specialists, including prophets, diviners, and rainmakers, mediate between the community and the spiritual realm. Ceremonies mark key transitions in life—birth, initiation, marriage, and death—and often involve songs, dance, animal sacrifice, and invocation of ancestral spirits.

Christianity and Islam have had a significant impact on many Nilotic communities since the 19th century, leading to religious pluralism and hybrid practices in contemporary settings.

=== Oral traditions and arts ===
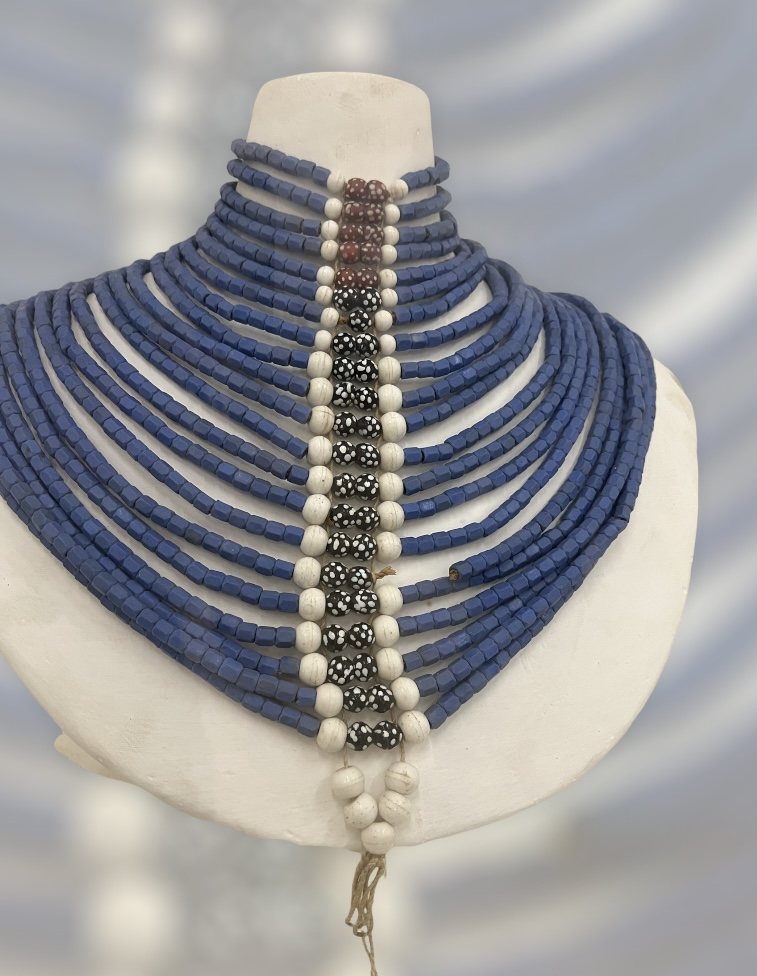
Dinka beaded collar, Sudan Ethnographic Museum, 2022

Nilotic cultures have rich oral traditions encompassing myths of origin, genealogies, epics, proverbs, and songs. These oral forms serve educational, historical, and moral functions, often reinforcing collective memory and identity.

Artistic expression is visible in body adornment, scarification, beadwork, and wood carving. Dance and music are central to communal life, with drums, horns, and vocal polyphony featuring prominently in ceremonies.

=== Gender and initiation ===
Various initiation rites mark the transition from childhood to adulthood. These rites confer full community membership and social roles.

Through lengthy interaction with neighbouring peoples, the Nilotes in East Africa have adopted many customs and practices from Southern Cushitic groups. The latter includes the age set system of social organization and also the practice of circumcision as a form of initiation.

=== Historical continuity and change ===
Despite colonial disruptions, war, and displacement, Nilotic cultures have shown remarkable resilience and adaptability. Contemporary Nilotic societies are engaged in national politics, modern economies, and global diasporas while maintaining distinct cultural practices.

== Genetics ==
=== Y DNA ===
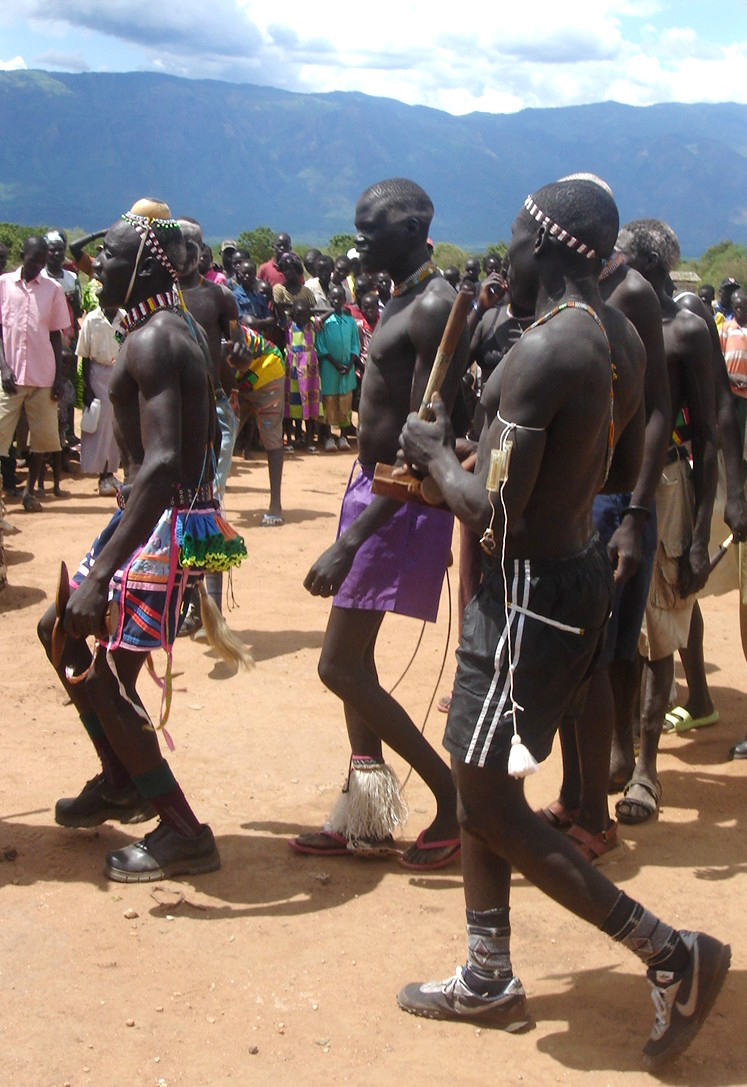
Nilotic men in Kapoeta, South Sudan

A Y-chromosome study by Wood et al. (2005) tested various populations in Africa for paternal lineages, including 26 Maasai and 9 Luo from Kenya, and 9 Alur from the Democratic Republic of Congo. The signature Nilotic paternal marker Haplogroup A3b2 was observed in 27% of the Maasai, 22% of the Alur, and 11% of the Luo.

Haplogroup B is another characteristically Nilotic paternal marker. It was found in 22% of Luo samples, 8% of Maasai, and 50% of Nuer peoples. The E1b1b haplogroup has been observed at overall frequencies around 11% among Nilo-Saharan-speaking groups in the Great Lakes area, with this influence concentrated among the Maasai (50%). This is indicative of substantial historic gene flow from Cushitic-speaking males into these Nilo-Saharan-speaking populations. 67% of the Alur samples possessed the E2 haplogroup.

The Y-DNA of populations in the Sudan region were studied, with various local Nilotic groups included for comparison. The signature Nilotic A and B clades were the most common paternal lineages amongst the Nilo-Saharan speakers, except those inhabiting western Sudan. There, a prominent North African influence was noted.

Haplogroup A was observed amongst 62% of Dinka, 53.3% of Shilluk, 46.4% of Nuba, 33.3% of Nuer, 31.3% of Fur, and 18.8% of Masalit. Haplogroup B was found in 50% of Nuer, 26.7% of Shilluk, 23% of Dinka, 14.3% of Nuba, 3.1% of Fur, and 3.1% of Masalit. The E1b1b clade was also observed in 71.9% of the Masalit, 59.4% of the Fur, 39.3% of the Nuba, 20% of the Shilluk, 16.7% of the Nuer, and 15% of the Dinka. Balemi (2018) found that a sample of 50 Nuer carried e1b1b-M78 (32%), A-M13 (28%), B-M60 (24%) and F-M89 (4%).

Solomon Balemi (2018) Genetic Study of LCT- Enhancer, Y chromosome and Mitochondrial DNA Variation in Some Ethnic Groups in Ethiopia.

The atypically high frequencies of the haplogroup in the Masalit was attributed to either a recent population bottleneck, which likely altered the community's original haplogroup diversity, or to geographical proximity to E1b1b's place of origin in North Africa. The clade "might have been brought to Sudan [...] after the progressive desertification of the Sahara around 6,000–8,000 years ago". Similarly, Afro-Asiatic influence was seen in the Nilotic Datog of northern Tanzania, 43% of whom carried the M293 subclade of E1b1b.

=== mtDNA ===
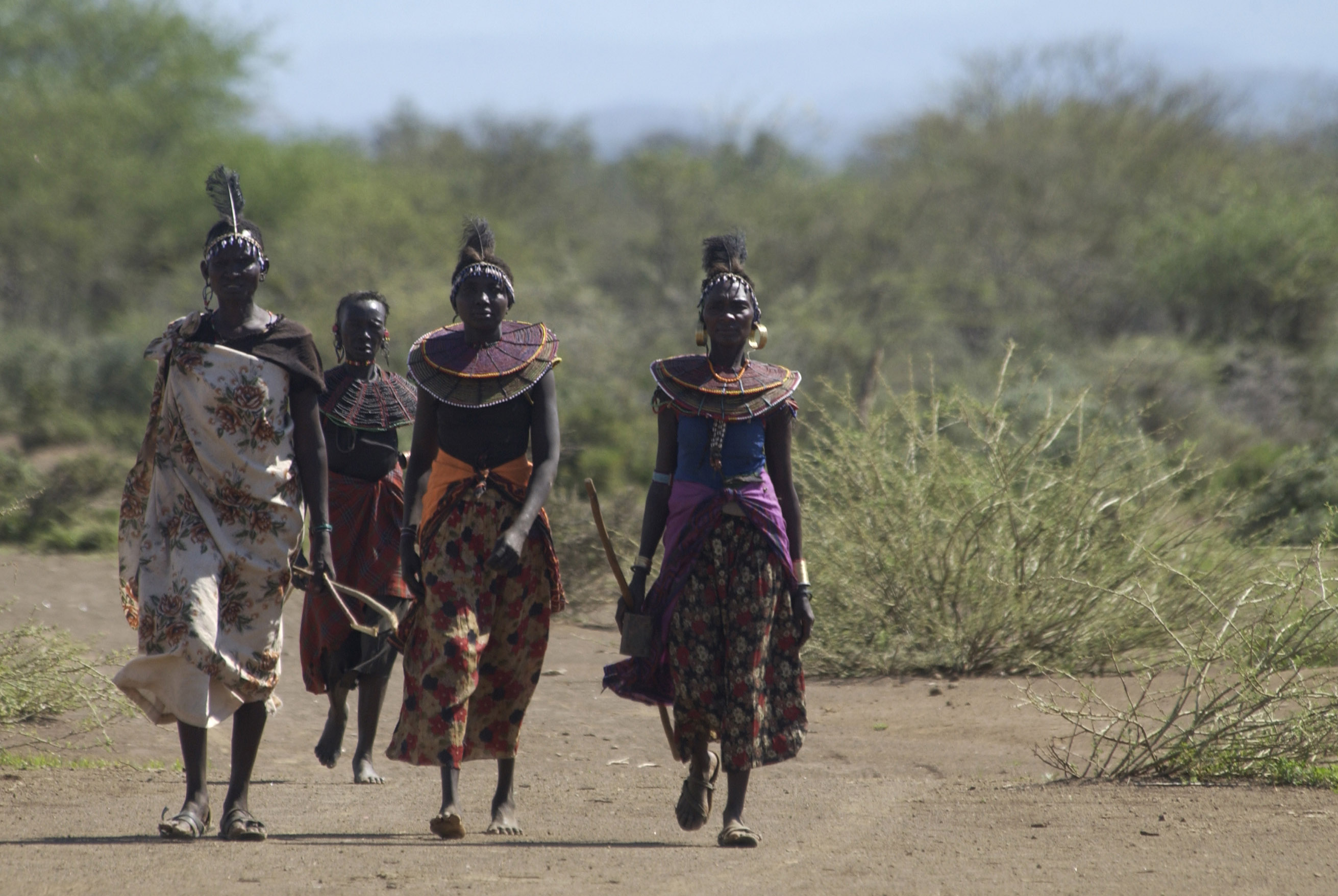
Pokot women trekking through the Kenya outback

Unlike the paternal DNA of Nilotes, the maternal lineages of Nilotes in general show low-to-negligible amounts of Afro-Asiatic and other extraneous influences. An mtDNA study examined the maternal ancestry of various Nilotic populations in Kenya, with Turkana, Samburu, Maasai, and Luo individuals sampled. The mtDNA of almost all of the tested Nilotes belonged to various sub-Saharan macro-haplogroup L subclades, including L0, L2, L3, L4, and L5. Low levels of maternal gene flow from North Africa and the Horn of Africa were observed in a few groups, mainly by the presence of mtDNA haplogroup M and haplogroup I lineages in about 12.5% of the Maasai and 7% of the Samburu samples, respectively.

=== Autosomal DNA ===
The autosomal DNA of Nilotic peoples has been examined in a study on the genetic clusters of various populations in Africa. According to the researchers, Nilotes generally form their own African genetic cluster, although relatively most closely related to other Nilo-Saharan populations, more distantly followed by Afro-Asiatic speakers and Niger-Congo speakers. The authors also found that certain Nilotic populations in the eastern Great Lakes region, such as the Maasai, showed some additional Afro-Asiatic affinities due to repeated assimilation of Cushitic-speaking peoples over the past 5000 or so years.

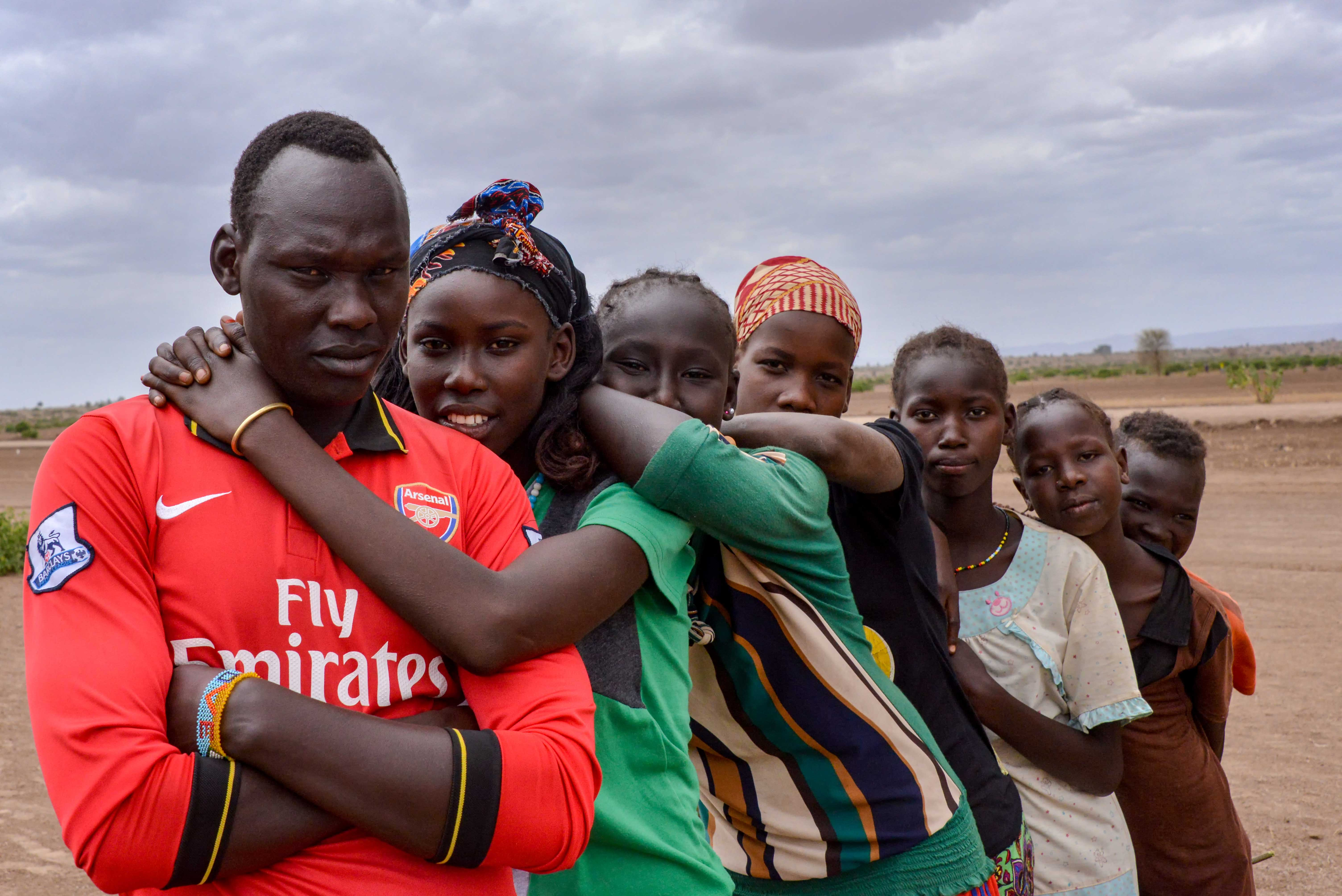
Nyangatom people in Ethiopia

Overall, Nilotic people and other Nilo-Saharan groups are closely related to Afro-Asiatic speakers of North and East Africa. Both groups are inferred to have diverged from a common ancestor around 16,000 years ago. Nilotic people and other Nilo-Saharan groups are also closely related to Niger-Congo speakers of West and Central Africa. Both groups are inferred to have diverged from a common ancestor around 28,000 years ago, perhaps somewhere in the Sahel. Most Nilotic peoples have predominant to exclusive West/East African ancestry, although some groups display varying degrees of West-Eurasian admixture, mostly mediated indirectly through pastoralists from the Horn of Africa.

=== Admixture analysis ===
In 121 African populations, four African American populations, and 60 non-African populations, results indicated a high degree of mixed ancestry reflecting migration events. In East Africa, all population groups examined had elements of Nilotic, Cushitic and Bantu ancestry amongst others to varying degrees. By and large, genetic clusters were consistent with linguistic classification with notable exceptions including the Luo of Kenya. Despite being Nilo-Saharan speakers, the Luo cluster with the Niger-Kordofanian-speaking populations that surround them. This indicates a high degree of admixture occurred during the southward migration of southern Luo. Kalenjin groups and Maasai groups were found to have less Bantu ancestry, but significant Cushitic ancestry.

== See also ==
- Shanqella, historical Ethiopian term for persons of Nilotic origin
- Junubi, North Sudanese term for people from South Sudan
- Nilotic languages
- Dinka People
