= Deng (god) =

God in Dinka mythology

- Sky, rain, fertility
- Affiliation: Nhialic
- Ethnic group: Dinka

Genealogy
- Parents: Abuk (mother)

Deng, also known as Denka, Deng-dit, Diing, and Dinga-dit, is a sky, rain, and fertility god in Dinka mythology for the Dinka people of Sudan and South Sudan. He is the son of the goddess Abuk, who is considered the first woman to fertilize the land and provide nourishment for the people. Deng holds dominion over the production of food on Earth, and some myths refer to him as the ancestor of the Dinka.

Among the Nuer, Deng is considered to be "a foreign deity" and "a bringer of disease". His daughter is the moon goddess. In Dinka religion, he is a storm and fertility god bringing lightning, rain, and thunder. The word deng means "rain" in Thuɔŋjäŋ.

Among his followers, Deng is regarded as the intermediary between humans and the supreme being. The spirit and modern world cannot be separated, as they are connected to Deng. He is closely linked with the supreme god Nhialic, and in some areas of Dinka country, Deng and Nhialic are "regarded as one and the same".

He was an important sky god, to some clans an ancestor and creator god of the Dinka people, and he manifested himself in the fertilizing water that fell from the heavens.
