= Nyibol =

Girls name in South Sudan

Nyibol is a common name among the Dinka people of South Sudan, given to girls and meaning "moon". The name represents a girl born after twins.
