= Ayuel =

Ayuel is a Dinka given name and surname. Notable people with this name include:

- Aiwel (sometimes spelled Ayuel), Dinka mythological figure
- Albino Mathom Ayuel Aboug (born 1979), South Sudanese diplomat and politician
- Ring Ayuel (born 1988), South Sudanese college basketball player
- Sylvester Madut Abraham Ayuel Kiir (born 1933), South Sudanese educationalist
