= Dinka religion =

Traditional beliefs of the Dinka people of South Sudan

Dinka spirituality is the traditional religion of the Dinka people (also known as Muonyjang), an ethnic group of South Sudan. They belong to the Nilotic peoples, which is a group of cultures in Southern Sudan and wider Eastern Africa. The Dinka people largely rejected or ignored Islamic and Christian teachings, as Abrahamic religious beliefs were incompatible with their society, culture and traditional beliefs.

== Creation of humans and life ==
The supreme creator god, Nhialic (pronounced as Nhialich), is the god of the sky and rain, and the ruler of all the other gods and spirits. He is generally seen as distant from humans. Nhialic is also known as Jaak, Juong or Dyokin by other Nilotic groups such as the Nuer and Shilluk. Nhialic created ex-nihilo and rarely involves itself with the affairs of humans.

There are several versions of the Dinka creation myth which mainly concerns itself with the creation of humans. The first humans are Garang and Abuk. In some cases Nhialic created humans by blowing them out of its nose, other accounts say humans originated from the sky and were placed in the river where they came as fully formed adults. Other accounts say that humans were molded as clay figures and placed to mature in pots. Garang and Abuk were made out of the clay of Sudan.

Nhialic told them to multiply and that their children would die but would come back to life within 15 days. Garang protested that if nobody dies permanently then there would not be enough food. Nhialic then introduced permanent death. Nhialic commanded them to only plant one seed of grain a day or gave them one grain to eat a day. Being hungry, everyday Abuk made a paste with the grain to make the food last longer. However, when Abuk disobeyed and planted more, Nhialic cut the rope that connected Heaven and Earth.

== Pantheon ==
The Dinka have a pantheon of deities, most notable:

- Nhialic, a supreme god
- Du Chie, a creation god, sometimes precursor, other co-creator with Nhialic
- Ayum, goddess of the wind. She is often referred to as a force that prevents rain from falling.
- Alwet, goddess of the rain.
- Aja.
- Nyanngol, also known as Nyanwol or Nyancar, a female goddess.
- Gerrang, also known as Garang. Johnston (1934) described him as a malicious god who often leads humans to commit sins, while Lienhardt (1961) portrays him as a healer deity, though Lienhardt also confirms that the Dinka people tend to attribute misfortunes to Garang.
- Ayak, counterpart to Ayum, is a female divinity who, depending on Dinka country, is regarded as either the mother of Abuk or the same divinity.
- Abum
- Abuk Dit, a mother goddess
- Dengdit or Deng, is the sky god of rain and fertility. Deng's mother is Abuk, the patron goddess of gardening and all women, represented by a snake.

The term "Jok" refers to a group of ancestral spirits and patron deities of tribes.

Jok mean Power (plural: jaak). Lienhardt writes:

"Divinity and divinities belong to that widest class of ultra-human agency collectively called, in Dinka, jok, Power. Jok is less specific in connotation than nhialic or yath, Divinity or a divinity. Jok as a noun may refer to a particular ultra-human Power. It has the plural form jaak when several distinct individual existences of this kind are in mind. It has also, however, like yath, a qualitative sense, indicating the kind and quality of ultra-human power, rather than any particular Power.

== Invocation of prayers ==
The Dinka address their prayers first to the Supreme Being Nhialic then invoke other deities.

The Dinka offer prayers for receiving mild weather. They also pray for good harvest, protection of people, cattle recovery from illness, and good hunting.

Sacrifices of a bull or ox are offered to Nhialic. The Dinka perform sacrifices along with prayers. The invokes all clan-divinities, free-divinities and ancestral spirits and at times Nhialic. Those who are saying the prayers hold a fishing spear in their hands. Short phrases expressing the need are chanted while the spear is thrust at the animal to be sacrificed. The participants repeat the words of the leader. At times of crisis or an important occasion the Dinka will continue to pray and sacrifice for long periods of time.

Stages of sacrificial prayer.

1. The Leader describes the issue the people are facing.

2. The Leader and all present Acknowledge past sins.

3. Praise is offered singing hymns of honor or ox-songs.

4. Expulsion of the misfortune to the sacrificial animal.

== Animism ==
The Dinka are also animists. They have a Pastoral lifestyle. The Dinka inherit a totem from both their parents. The faithful are expected to make offerings to their totem force and maintain positive relations with members. Eating or hurting your totem animal is a bad omen for those who share a totem. Some totems are believed to endow powers. The owl totem, for example, is believed to give the power of providence. Totems are not exclusively animals, although most are; some Dinka having as their totem a metallic ore or element.

In the Dinka language, a totem is known as a kuar. Dinka do not worship their totems but rather speak of being "related" to them.

=== Snakes ===
Some Dinka people respect African puff adders. The most commonly respected snakes are Atemyath, Biar keroor, and Maluang. These snakes are given offerings of locally made melted cheese to appease them, after which they are released into the forest. Killing snakes is believed to be a bad omen for the community or the individual, with the assumption that spirits may strike the killer.

== Astrology ==
As in other cultures, the Dinka practice a form of astrology:

The Dinka name the stars—for example, “Orion” is called “Wathal Jook.” Orion is a hunter in Greek mythology but Wathal Jook (dogs) are hunters also. The constellation of the scorpion, in Dinka, is called Cuur, which is a type of fish that looks like a scorpion. We believe these mythologies may connect us with others in the east. In our religion the mythology of Ayueldit recounts he was looking for external life and said “the son is eternal.” So they looked for the food of the sun and sent his messengers west cautioning them “go where the sun is every evening.”

== Bibliography ==
- (in English) Lienhardt, Godfrey, "Divinity and Experience: The Religion of the Dinka", Oxford University Press (1988), ISBN 0198234058 (Retrieved : 9 June 2012)
- (in English) Lienhardt, Godfrey (1961-01-01). Divinity and Experience : The Religion of the Dinka: The Religion of the Dinka. Oxford University Press, UK. ISBN 978-0-19-159185-3.
- (in English) Evens, T. M. S., "Anthropology As Ethics: Nondualism and the Conduct of Sacrifice", Berghahn Books (2009), ISBN 1845456297
- (in English) Seligman, C. G. (1932). Pagan tribes of the Nilotic Sudan. London: G. Routledge & Sons.
- Beswick, S. F. (1994). "Non-Acceptance of Islam in the Southern Sudan: The Case of the Dinka from the Pre-Colonial Period to Independence (1956)". Northeast African Studies. 1 (2/3): 19–47. doi:10.1353/nas.1994.0018. ISSN 0740-9133. JSTOR 41931096. S2CID 143871492.
- Lynch, Patricia Ann; Roberts, Jeremy (2010). African Mythology, A to Z. Infobase Publishing. ISBN 978-1-4381-3133-7.
- Jok, Kuel Maluil (2010). Animism of the Nilotics and Discourses of Islamic Fundamentalism in Sudan. Sidestone Press. ISBN 978-90-8890-054-9.
- Johnston, R. T. (1934). "The Religious and Spiritual Beliefs of the Bor Dinka". Sudan Notes and Records. 17 (1): 124–128. ISSN 0375-2984. JSTOR 41716073.
- George, Vensus (June 15, 2008). Paths to the Divine: Ancient and Indian. Council for Research in Values & Philosophy. ISBN 978-1565182486.
- Beswick, Stephanie (2004). Sudan's Blood Memory. The Legacy of War, Ethnicity, and Slavery in South Sudan. University Rochester Press. ISBN 978-1-58046-151-1.
- Jenkins, Dr. Orville B. “The Dinka Of South Sudan.” Profile of the Dinka People of South Sudan, http://strategyleader.org/profiles/dinka.html.
- Olupona, Jacob K.; Kunnie, Julian E. (2015). "African Indigenous Religions". Worldmark Encyclopedia of Religious Practices (2 ed.). Farmington, MI: Gale. ISBN 9781414498751.
