= Alek Wek =

South Sudanese-British model and designer

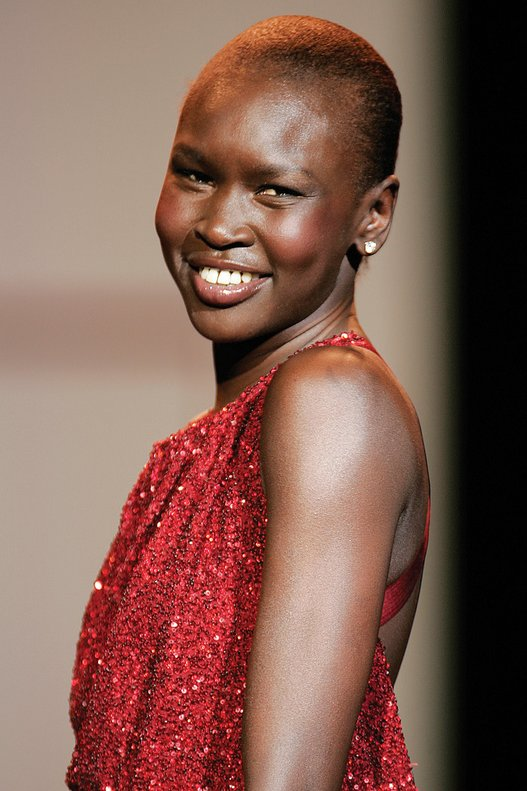
- Alek at the Red Collection 2007 for The Heart Truth campaign
- Born: 16 April 1977 (age 49); Wau, Sudan (now South Sudan)
- Occupations: Model, Actress
- Years active: 1995–present
- Partner: Riccardo Sala (2001–2013)
- Modelling information
- Height: 5 ft 11 in (1.80 m)
- Hair colour: Dark brown
- Eye colour: Brown
- Agency: IMG Models (New York, Paris, Los Angeles, Sydney); d'management group (Milan); Storm Management (London); Mega Model Agency (Hamburg)

Alek Wek (born 16 April 1977) is a South Sudanese–British model and designer who began her fashion career at the age of 18 in 1995. She has been hailed for her influence on the perception of beauty in the fashion industry. She is from the Dinka ethnic group in South Sudan, but fled to Britain in 1991 to escape the civil war in Sudan. In 2015, she was listed as one of BBC's 100 Women.

== Early life ==
Alek was born 16 April 1977 in Wau, Sudan (now South Sudan), in a two-bedroom house without electricity or running water, and is the seventh of nine children. Her mother Akuol (b. 1946) was a housewife, and her father Athian (1933–1985) was an education official. Her name reportedly means "Black Spotted Cow".

When the civil war broke out in Wau in 1985, the Wek family had to flee from both rebel and government forces. Her father Athian once broke his hip in a bicycle accident, and his hip was repaired with metal pins. Long periods of walking caused Athian's hip to get infected, and upon the family's return to Wau, he became paralysed and endured a haemorrhage. He died at a relative's home in Khartoum.

== Career ==
=== Beginnings ===
After arriving in London at age 14, Alek's psoriasis immediately cleared. She enrolled in the London College of Fashion and studied Fashion Business and Technology.

Alek was discovered at an outdoor market in 1995 in Crystal Palace, London by a Models 1 scout. She appeared in the music video for "GoldenEye" by Tina Turner that year, and shortly thereafter began fashion modeling. She was signed to Ford Models in 1996 and also appeared in the "Got 'Til It's Gone" music video by Janet Jackson that year. She was named "Model of the Year" in 1997 by MTV, and was the first African model to appear on the cover of Elle that year.

=== Modelling ===
Alek has modelled for many notable fashion houses. She has appeared on the cover of American, French, German and South African Elle as well as i-D, Cosmopolitan, Glamour, Forbes Magazine Africa and Ebony. She has also been featured in editorials in American and British Vogue. In 2002 she made her acting debut in The Four Feathers as Sudanese princess Aquol. Herb Ritts photographed her for a 1999 calendar in a Joanne Gair body painting that was a highlight of Gair's first retrospective.

In September 2015 Alek walked for Marc Jacobs at Spring/Summer 2016 New York Fashion Week, later appearing in the label's Spring Summer 2016 campaign. In May 2016, she modelled for four special edition covers of Brazilian Elle.

=== Image ===
Dark-skinned models were rare, if not unheard of, in the high fashion industry. As a result, Alek's mainstream success was celebrated by black women all over the world. Oprah Winfrey commented that "if Alek had been on the cover of a magazine when I was growing up, I would have had a different concept of who I was." In a speech on beauty and self-perception, Kenyan-Mexican actress Lupita Nyong'o stated that she had been a self-conscious, insecure teenager before seeing Alek in the spotlight: "When I saw Alek, I inadvertently saw a reflection of myself that I could not deny. Now, I had a spring in my step because I felt more seen, more appreciated by the far-away gatekeepers of beauty".

=== Designing ===
Alek also designs a range of designer handbags called "Wek 1933", which are available throughout selected Selfridges department stores. The name refers to the year her father was born. Her inspiration for the designs came from the brass-clasp briefcase carried by her father.

== Campaigning ==
Since 2002 Alek has been an advisor to the U.S. Committee for Refugees Advisory Council, which helps to raise awareness about the situation in Sudan, as well as the plight of refugees worldwide.

She is a missionary for World Vision, an organisation which combats AIDS, an ambassador for Doctors Without Borders in Sudan, and devotes time to UNICEF.

In 2007 she released an autobiography, entitled Alek: From Sudanese Refugee to International Supermodel, documenting her journey from a childhood of poverty in Sudan to the catwalks of Europe.

In 2011 she appeared as a guest judge in the sixteenth cycle of America's Next Top Model.

In July 2012 she returned to South Sudan with the UN Refugee Agency to highlight the stories of refugees returning from the north and the massive efforts needed to build and stabilise the country. In 2012, Alek teamed up with Amarula as the face of their campaign African Originals.

== Personal life ==
As of 2009 Wek resided in Brooklyn, New York. She was in a relationship with Riccardo Sala, an Italian real estate developer, for twelve years; they separated in 2013. She is the aunt of the runway model Ataui Deng.

== Filmography ==
Music videos
Year	Title	Artist	Role	Note
1995	GoldenEye	Tina Turner	Herself	
1997	Got 'Til It's Gone	Janet Jackson	Herself	
2025	Gorgeous	Doja Cat	Herself	

Television
Year	Title	Role	Notes
2011	America's Next Top Model	Herself	Guest Judge
2011	Britain & Ireland's Next Top Model	Herself	Guest Judge

Film
Year	Title	Role	Note
2002	The Four Feathers	Aquol	Film Debut
2018	Suspiria	Miss Millius	

== See also ==
- List of refugees
