= Dinka people =

Nilotic ethnic group native to South Sudan

Muonyjang/Dinka
Muonyjang
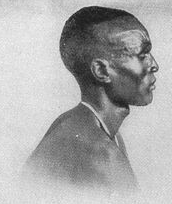
- Portrait of Dinka man

Regions with significant populations
- South Sudan: 4.5 million

Languages
- Dinka

Religion
- Christianity, Dinka religion, Islam

Related ethnic groups
- Nuer and other Nilotic peoples

The Dinka people (Dinka: Muonyjang) are a Nilotic ethnic group native to South Sudan. The Dinka mostly live along the Nile, from Mangalla-Bor to Renk, in the region of Bahr el Ghazal, Upper Nile (two out of three provinces that were formerly part of southern Sudan), and the Abyei area of the Ngok Dinka in South Sudan.

They number around 4.5 million, according to the 2008 Sudan census, constituting about 40% of the population of that country and the largest ethnic group in South Sudan. The Dinka refer to themselves as Muonyjang (singular) and jieng (plural).

== Origins ==
The Dinka originated from the Gezira in what became Sudan. In ancient times, this region was once occupied by the Kingdom of Kush. In medieval times, the area was ruled by the kingdom of Alodia, a Christian, multi-ethnic empire in Nubia. Living in its southern periphery and interacting with the Nubians, the Dinka absorbed a sizable amount of Nubian vocabulary. From the 13th century, with the disintegration of Alodia, the Dinka began to migrate out of Gezira, fleeing slave raids, military conflict, and droughts. The Dinka are mainly agro-pastoral people and survive on cattle, they are semi-nomadic and number around 4.5 million people.

Conflict over pastures and cattle raids have occurred between Dinka and Nuer as they battled for grazing land.

Dinka migration from Gezira & Alodia

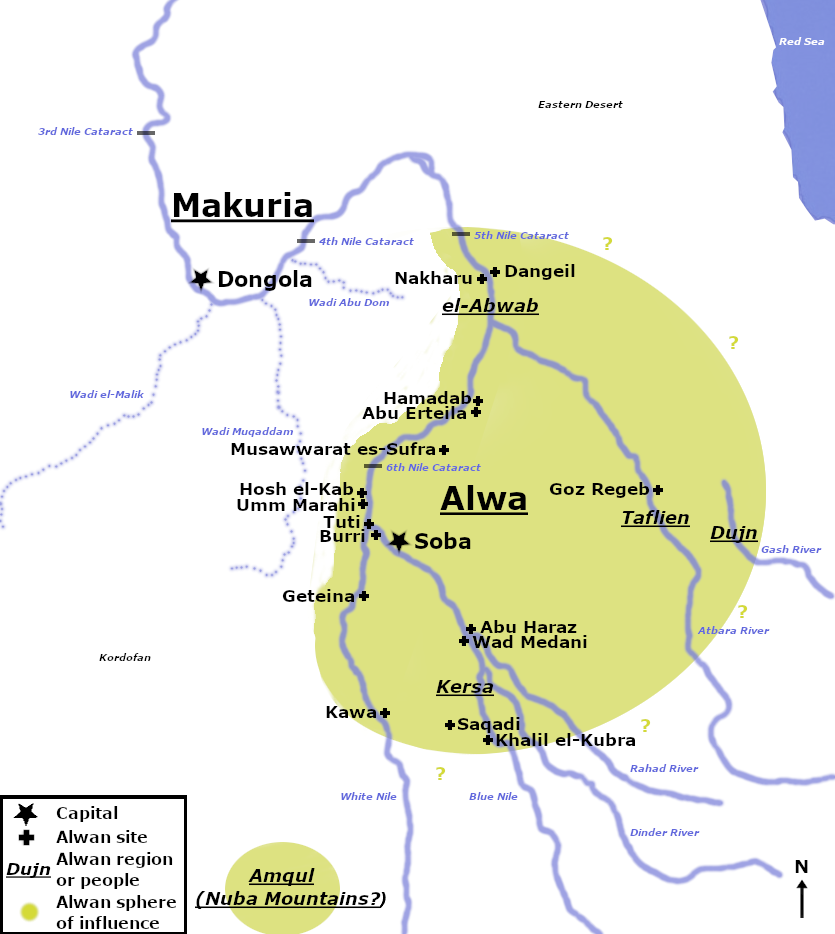
Approximate extension of Alodia based on accounts of Ibn Hawqal

The Dinka presence in Alwa suggests a significant historical connection between the Dinka and the Kingdom of Alwa. Cultural practices, such as beer-drinking rituals during sowing and harvesting sorghum, reflect similarities to Nubian traditions noted by Ibn Selim el-Assouani, indicating a continuity of influence from Alwa. Historical accounts, including manuscripts from the 18th century, reference the Dinka's ancestral ties to the Alwan Nubians, with early modern Sudanese manuscript writers noting that they are derived from the "Anag", a term used by Spaulding to describe eastern sudanic speaking peoples who were a part of the kingdom of Alodia. Linguistic studies support the idea that the Dinka resided in the Gezira, which was under Alwa's influence before their migration southward, likely due to political upheaval and increased slavery following Alwa's decline in the 13th century. Shared Nilotic traditions, such as human sacrifice and ceremonial regicide, further indicate a cultural heritage influenced by Nubian practices. Additionally, 13th-century accounts by Ibn Sa'id al-Andalusi describe the Damadim, who were engaged in conflict with the Alodians, highlighting interactions between Nilotic groups and Nubian territories. Archaeological evidence, including the tradition of king-killing, links the Dinka to later groups who lived in Alodia's successor state Fazughli where the custom persisted into the 19th century.

The Damadim, a group of Africans mentioned by various medieval Arab writers during the 13th century, may have been ancestors of the Dinka and other Western Nilotic groups like the Luo peoples. They were reported to live southwest of Alodia, possibly in the Southern Gezira or around the Bahr al-Ghazal and Sobat regions of South Sudan. Stephanie Beswick suggests that the Dinka's ancestors could have been based along the White Nile in the Gezira plains. The Damadim were known for their raids and conquests, notably their sacking of the Christian Kingdom of Alodia's capital, Soba, around 1220 A.D. During this period, they were referred to as the "Tatars of the Sudan" due to their simultaneous raids with the Mongol invasions of Persia. Archaeological evidence from Soba indicates significant destruction, including the looting of burial sites and the destruction of two major churches, possibly tied to the Damadim conquest. Despite the limited sources, the Damadim's movements and activities provide a potential link to the later (western) Nilotic migrations into South Sudan that would occur post-1000 A.D. and are linked with the introduction of humped cattle.

The Dinka migrations southward during the 15th to 18th centuries played a crucial role in shaping their territorial dominance in what is now South Sudan. Following the collapse of the Alodian Kingdom and the establishment of the Funj Sultanate in 1504 by Sultan Amara Dunqas, the Dinka, alongside other Nilotic groups like the Shilluk, moved further south, clashing with the Funj and other local populations. Oral traditions and archaeological evidence suggest that the Dinka displaced and absorbed various groups in their path, including the remnants of the Funj people, who were themselves possibly linked to the Nubian traditions of medieval Alodia. These conflicts between the Dinka and the Funj are well-documented in Dinka oral histories, with stories of fierce battles where the Dinka eventually forced the Funj northward, allowing them to establish their sultanate as Sennār, which the Dinka would also raid in the following centuries. Over time the Dinka and Funj developed more complex relationship. the Dinka continued to expand into western and southern territories, solidifying their presence and dominance in much of modern South Sudan.

Dinka men with spears, necklaces and bracelets

The Dinka's religions, beliefs, and lifestyle have led to conflict with the Arab Islamic government in Khartoum. The Sudan People's Liberation Army, led by Dinka John Garang, took arms against the government in 1983. During the subsequent 21-year civil war, many thousands of Dinka, along with non-Dinka southerners, were massacred by government forces. Since the independence of South Sudan, the Dinka, led by Salva Kiir, engaged in a civil war with the Nuer and other groups, who accuse them of monopolising power.

=== Christianity ===
In 1983, due to Sudan's second civil war, many educated Dinka were forced to flee the cities to rural areas. Some were Christians who had been converted by the Church Missionary Society. Among them were ordained clergymen who began preaching in the villages. Songs and praise were used to teach the mostly illiterate Dinka about the faith. Most Dinka converted to Christianity and are learning to adapt traditional religious practices to Christian teachings. The conversion took place in rural villages and among Dinka refugees country. The Lost Boys of Sudan were converted in significant numbers in the refugee camps of Ethiopia.

=== Dinka massacre ===
Between 2013 and 2014, forces led by the breakaway Riek Machar faction deliberately killed an estimated 2,000 civilians from Hol, Nyarweng, Twic east and Bor and wounded several thousand more over two months. Much of their wealth was destroyed, which led to mass starvation deaths. It is estimated that 100,000 people left the area following the attack.

== Physique ==
Dinka are noted for their height, and, along with the Tutsi of Rwanda, they are the tallest group in Africa. Roberts and Bainbridge reported an average height of 182.6 cm (5 ft 11.9 in) in a sample of 52 Dinka Agaar and 181.3 cm (5 ft 11.4 in) in 227 Dinka Ruweng measured in 1953–1954. However, the stature of Dinka males later declined, possibly as a consequence of undernutrition and conflicts. An anthropometric survey of Dinka men, war refugees in Ethiopia, published in 1995, found a mean height of 176.4 cm (5 ft 9.4 in).

== Agriculture and pastoral strategies ==
An example of rainy season temporary settlements—note the stilts upon which the huts are built to protect against periodic flooding of the region

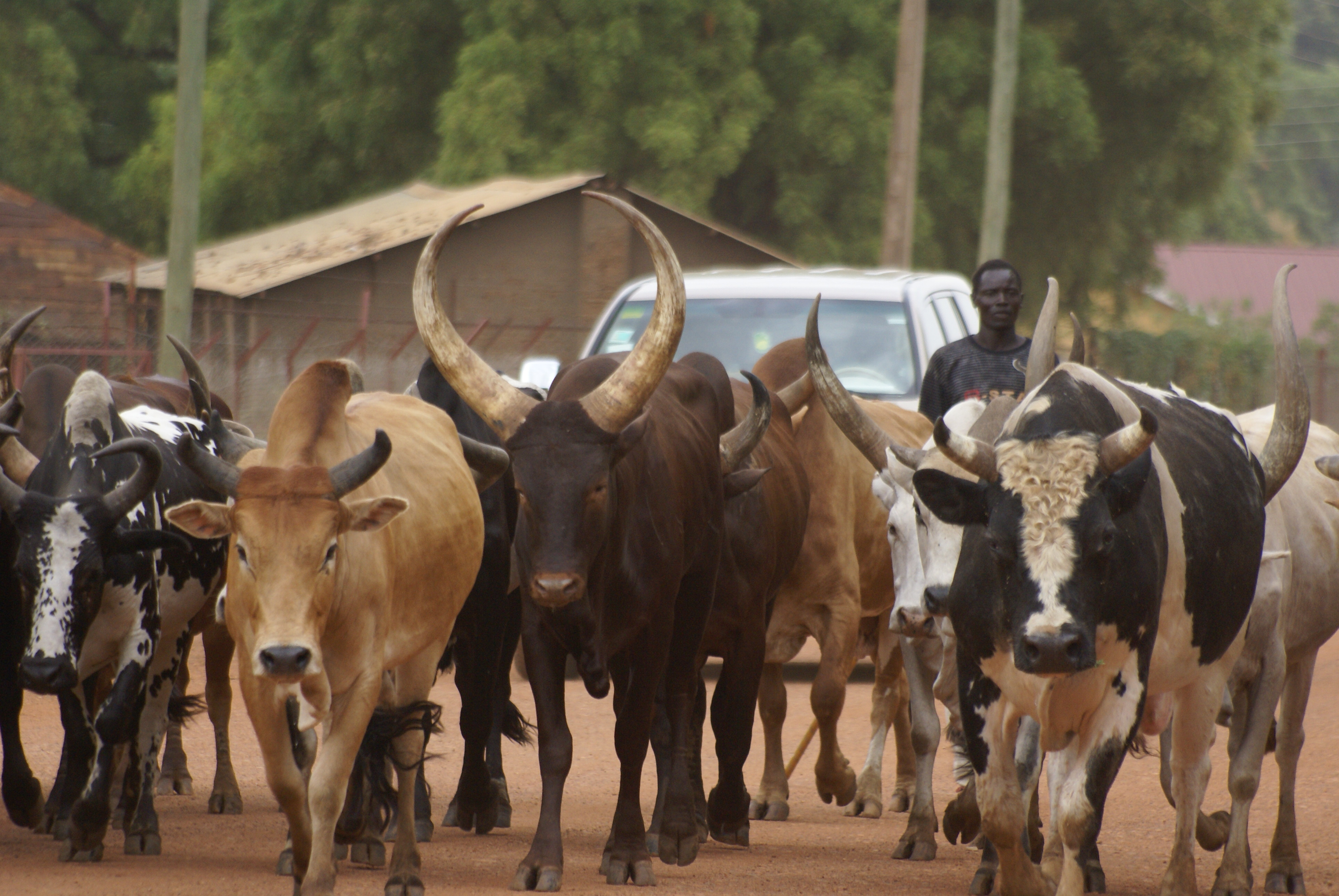
Cattle of the Dinka people, Juba, South Sudan

Southern Sudan is "a large basin gently sloping northward", through which flow the Bahr el Jebel River, the White Nile, the Bahr el Ghazal (Nam) River and its tributaries, and the Sobat, all merging into the vast Sudd swamp.

Vast oil areas are present to the south and east on the flood plain, a basin in southern Sudan into which the rivers of Congo, Uganda, Kenya, and Ethiopia drain from an ironstone plateau that belts the regions of Bahr El Ghazal and Upper Nile.

The terrain can be divided into four land classes:

- Highlands: higher than the surrounding plains by a few centimetres; there host permanent settlements. Vegetation consists of open thorn woodland and/or open mixed woodland with grasses.
- Intermediate Lands: slightly below the highlands, commonly subject to flooding from rainfall in the Ethiopian and East/Central African highlands. Vegetation is mostly open perennial grassland with some acacia woodland and other sparsely distributed trees.
- Toic: land seasonally inundated by rivers and inland water courses, retaining enough moisture throughout the dry season to support cattle grazing.
- Sudd: permanent swampland below the level of the toic; covers a substantial part of the floodplain; provides good fishing but not grazing; historically a physical barrier to outsiders.

The ecology of the large basin is unique; until recently, wild animals and birds flourished, rarely hunted by the agro-pastoralists.

The climate determines the Dinka's migration patterns, responding to the periodic flooding and dryness of their surroundings. They begin moving around May–June, at the onset of the rainy season, migrating to their settlements of mud and thatch housing situated above flood level, where they plant their crops of millet and other grains. These rainy season settlements feature other permanent structures such as cattle byres (luak) and granaries. During the dry season (beginning about December–January), everyone except the aged, ill, and nursing mothers migrates to semi-permanent dwellings in the toic for cattle grazing. The cultivation of sorghum, millet, and other crops begins in the highlands in the early rainy season, and the harvest begins when the rains are heavy in June–August. Cattle are driven to the toic in September and November when the rainfall drops off and graze on crop remnants.

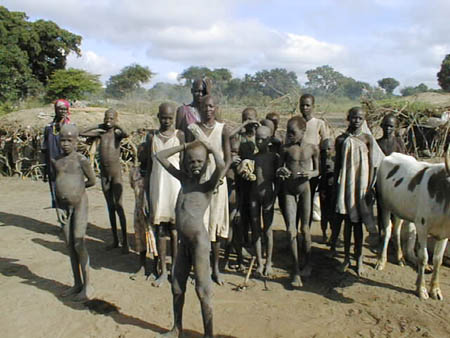
A cattle camp in Rumbek

While the Dinka are often seen as only pastoralists, they are actually agro-pastoralists. Agriculture plays a very big part in their livelihood, with Sorghum being their most important crop grown. The Dinka also grow okra, sesame, pumpkin, cow peas, maize, cassava, ground nuts, different types of beans, water melons, tobacco and millet. In Dinka society, both genders engage in cultivation, and on big farms the women brew beer and everyone is involved. Before the Sudanese civil wars, each household cultivated an average of two acres of sorghum around their homestead along with other crops. An estimated 87% of total calories and 76% of protein by weight are provided by crop production compared with 13% of calories and 24% of protein derived from livestock produce. Today, 83% of all available labor is estimated to be employed in agricultural activities compared with only 17% in livestock husbandry. In recent times, some poor or cattleless Dinka have farmed the land of their non-Dinka neighbors. According to the Balanda Bviri politician Bandindi Pascal Uru: "The Dinka are good cultivators; they cultivate slowly but surely for hours. When the Dinka leave the business of cattle they take the hoe very seriously."

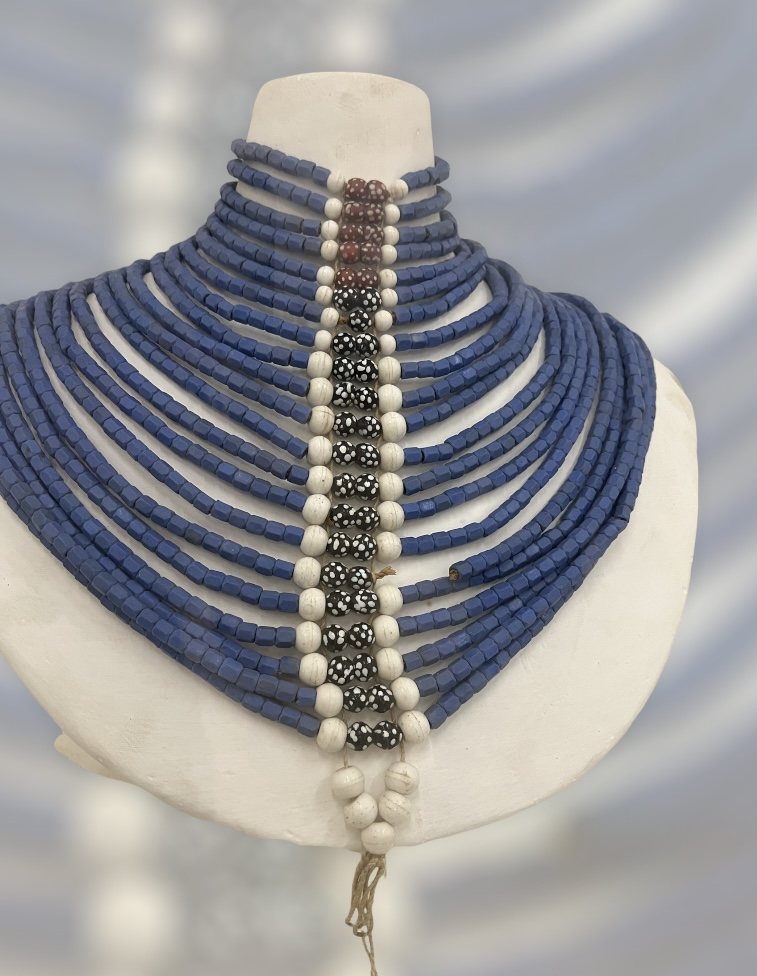
Dinka beaded collar, Sudan Ethnographic Museum, 2022

The connection of agriculture and economics to Dinka marriage is important. Grain as well as cattle have been and continue to be used in both bartering and bridewealth payments. Wealth is acquired when a man and his family produce a small surplus of crops which they convert into a more stable and valuable resource – cattle. In turn, this enables a man to acquire more wives, more children, and thus more economic and political power. In Dinka society, cattle acquired by the wealth yielded from agriculture are considered a more stable form of "property." If a Dinka couple divorces, the cows given as bridewealth may be returned to the former husband. However, Dinka male members of clans who possess animals bought with grain, rather than acquired by way of marriage payments, are more honored and given more respect because their wealth is perceived as being more stable. Thus: "this cattle is not returnable and does not have external links and cannot be taken back easily, for example, by divorce. It therefore represents 'pure property' derived from labor and this kind of man has much more stable wealth and is more honored. However, no one has all cattle that are free of ties." Because of the link between agriculture, wealth, and marriage, the Dinka grow a wide variety of crops.

=== Caudatum sorghum ===
During their migrations, the Dinka introduced a new variety of sorghum into southern Sudan. Caudatum sorghum is drought resistant and produces well with very little care. This variety of Sorghum was not grown by tribes in the region and during the 1300s to 1600s, great droughts were occurring all over east and southern Africa, which caused many former tribes of South Sudan, like the Luo to migrate southwards (this drought is recorded in Luo oral history as the "Nyarubanga" famine). The tribes that did not migrate had only the option (if their crops completely died) to be in the service of their incoming wealthier Agro-pastoral neighbours like the Dinka.

=== Hump backed cattle ===
The adoption of Sanga and Zebu hump backed cattle was invaluable to the expansion of the Dinka throughout South Sudan. Hump backed cattle were considerably stronger than the previous humpless breeds in southern Sudan and are capable of withstanding long-distance transhumance patterns. Even more importantly, they were less affected by drought. The tribes of South Sudan did not possess these cattle, which gave the Dinka a large advantage when they introduced them in their southern migration. There was a long series of droughts that plagued Southern Sudan during this time period intensified the reliance on cattle for the people of the region, since livestock are indispensable in bad years when crop failure occurs. The introduction of this new breed by the Dinka was a significant causative factor in the spread of modern patterns of Nilotic pastoralism in Southern Sudan. Eventually these cattle replaced all of the previous humpless breeds. The domestication of caudatum sorghum, along with the more durable breeds of cattle introduced into this region of Southern Sudan an economic system of the greatest efficiency in Sudan and East Africa, giving the Dinka a military and political advantage over all other tribes in the region. These integrated systems were able to support population increases in the Bahr el-Ghazal and later expansions towards the west.

== Cultural and religious beliefs ==
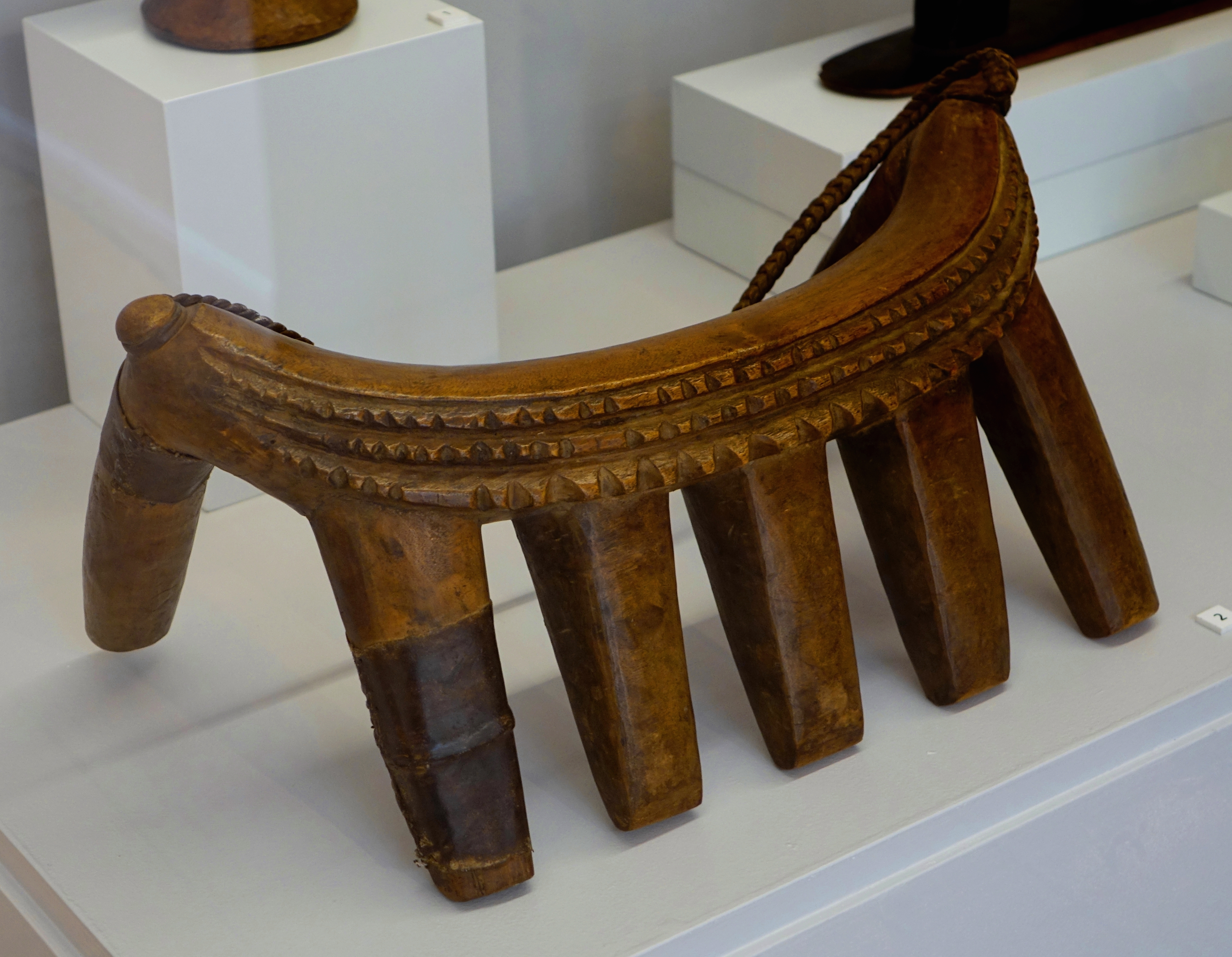
Dinka headrest at the National Museum of Anthropology, Madrid

Dinka religious beliefs and practices also reflect their lifestyle. The Dinka religion, like most other Nilotic faiths, is polytheistic, but has one creator, Nhialic, who leads the Dinka pantheon of gods and spirits. He is generally distant from humans and does not directly interact with them. The sacrificing of oxen by the "masters of the fishing spear" is central to Dinka religious practice. Young men become adults through an initiation ritual that includes marking the forehead with a sharp object. During this ceremony, they acquire a second cow-color name. The Dinka believe they derive religious power from nature and the world around them rather than from scripture.

Men and women eat separately. When milk supply is low, children get priority. Children are fed milk from 9–12 months. After about one year, children start eating solid food (porridge). After children turn three, they eat two meals a day. Adults also eat two meals a day.

In Dinka territory, there exist a number of mounds, described by the Dinka as “pyramids,” which have religious significance to those who tend them. These mounds were built in the form of a cone and the material used was cattle ashes, cow dung, cotton soil, clay, and debris. In all cases the history of the origin of each mound is connected to a prominent Dinka priest who ordered its construction by the people as a monument to his name.

=== Pyramid of Alel ===
A pyramid of stones known as Alel exists in the territory of Western Luaic Dinka in the town of Makuac. This pyramid entombs the body of a prominent Eastern Twic Dinka priest named Kuol Alel who led his people across from the banks of the eastern Nile and in the process of migrating west died in this region. Every year there is a celebration held ar Aled in honor of this prominent leader. The pyramid is located north of the Paliang region in the Bahr el-Ghazal, and local Dinka estimate that it pre-dates the Egyptian colonial period (1821) and hence is at least over 200 years old.

=== Pyramid of Yik Ayuong ===
In Padang territory in northern Dinka territory, east of the Nile, among the Dunghol Dinka and north of the city of Malakal, the pyramid of a priest, Ayuong Dit, is in the village of Rukcuk. The mound was built over the body of this priest who, with his wife and eight bulls, was locked up in their cattle byre by his express orders. District Commissioner Ibrahim Bedri, who served during the British colonial period, said that the pyramid "was seventy-five paces in circumference and twenty-six paces along the slope. During the harvest season it was cleared of grass, more earth was added to it, and the surface smoothed by women who made stripes along the pyramid with large quantities of durra (flour) in preparation for the annual ceremony yairunka baiet, which took place at the pyramid. During the celebrations the people gathered together for communal offerings to the spirit of Ayuong Dit and eight bulls were sacrificed, which was believed to make the women fertile. The mound is known as Yik Ayuong.

=== Pyramid of Luak Deng ===
The pyramid of Luak Deng is said to be the "Mecca" of the Dinka and Nuer people and contains the shrine of their deity (and possibly real historical figure) Deng Dit (Deng the Great). It comprises a palisade standing on higher ground near a picturesque pool of water surrounded by ardeiba and suba trees. This pyramid is connected in mythology with a chain of lesser shrines in the former Nyarruweng Dinka region in what has now become the territory of the Gaweir Nuer. Around the shrine and within a few miles of it reside a small section of Rut Dinka who have settled back and live there by agreement with the Nuer to tend the shrine. Luak Deng has become a shrine of great significance for both the Dinka and Nuer people.

=== Pyramid of Pwom Ayuel (or Aiwel) ===
The pyramid of Pwom Ayuel is said to be the burial place of Ayuel, the culture hero of the Dinka. It is found in what has now become Nuer territory on the southern part of an island formed by the Bahr el-Zeraf and Bahr el-Jebel Rivers (Zeraf Island). Some Dinka myths suggest that Ayuel was killed by external forces beyond his control. Aliab Dinka Parmena Awerial Aluong recounts a different oral history that suggests that the mound was built on the orders of Ayuel Longar himself. According to historical accounts, there were many years of toil in the early days during which Ayuel, who had reached the Nile and Sobat Rivers, ordered his people to construct a large monument. Some people died in the building of this structure, their bodies adding to the rising edifice. Some Dinka say this mound was built after Ayued's death. Today the mound remains a center of great sanctity, but is no longer attended with communal gatherings and ritual operations."

== Popular culture ==
Dinka refugees were portrayed in works such as Lost Boys of Sudan by Megan Mylan and Jon Shenk and God Grew Tired Of Us, Joan Hechts' book The Journey of the Lost Boys and the fictionalized autobiography of a Dinka refugee, Dave Eggers' What Is the What: The Autobiography of Valentino Achak Deng. Other books on and by the Lost Boys include The Lost Boys of Sudan by Mark Bixler, God Grew Tired of Us by John Bul Dau, They Poured Fire On Us From The Sky by Alephonsion Deng, Benson Deng, and Benjamin Ajak and A Long Walk to Water by Linda Sue Park. In 2004 the first volume of the graphic novel Echoes of the Lost Boys of Sudan was released in Dallas, Texas.

== Notable people ==
- Hussein Abdelbagi – Vice President of the Republic of South Sudan.
- Deng Adut – defence lawyer and former child soldier
- Adut Akech – model
- Elijah Malok Aleng – former Central Bank Governor
- Abel Alier, known as "Abel Alier Kwai" – the first southerner to serve as president of the High Executive Council of Southern Sudan and Vice President of Sudan (1972-1982)
- Aliir Aliir – Australian rules footballer
- Mathiang Yak Anek – 19th-century female chief and escaped slave
- George Athor – Sudan People's Liberation Army lieutenant general and an SPLA dissident
- Francis Bok – author
- Bol Bol – NBA player, son of Manute Bol
- Grace Bol – model
- Manute Bol – deceased former NBA player, one of the two tallest players in league history
- Daniel Deng Bul – former South Sudanese episcopalian archbishop and primate of the episcopal church of Sudan, now called the Province of the episcopal church of South Sudan.
- John Frog - Recording Artist
- Adut Bulgak – first South Sudanese WNBA player, 2016 draft
- Chok Dau – football player
- John Dau – one of the "Lost Boys of Sudan", author of God Grew Tired of Us, and the subject of the eponymous documentary
- Stephen Dhieu Dau – former Minister of Finance and Planning of the Republic of South Sudan and SPLM member
- Majak Daw – Australian Rules Footballer
- Aldo Deng – former Sudanese cabinet member and South Sudanese statesman; father of Luol Deng
- Ataui Deng – model and niece of Alek Wek
- Lt. General Dominic Dim Deng – South Sudan's first political officer of SPLA, Minister for SPLA Affairs
- Francis Deng – author and SAIS research professor
- Luol Deng – former NBA player
- Thomas Deng – football player
- Wenyen Gabriel – NBA Player
- John Garang – former First Vice President of Sudan, Commander in Chief of Sudan People's Liberation Army and Chairman of Sudan People's Liberation Movement.
- Kuol Manyang Juuk – former Commander of the SPLA Forces, Minister in the Government of National Unity, Governor of Jonglei State, former minister of Defence and current Senior Presidential Advisor
- Michael Makuei Lueth – lawyer, spokesman and current minister of Information and Postal Service for South Sudan.
- Awer Mabil – football player
- Rebecca Nyandeng De Mabior – Vice President of South Sudan
- Ater Majok – former NBA player
- Thon Maker – former NBA player
- Bona Malwal – journalist and politician
- Guor Marial – marathon runner
- Mathiang Mathiang
- Majak Mawith – Soccer player
- Salva Kiir– first president of the Republic of South Sudan, Commander in Chief of Sudan People's Liberation Army, and Chairman of Sudan People's Liberation Movement
- Tokmac Nguen – footballer
- William Deng Nhial – political leader of Sudan African National Union, SANU and co-founder of Anya Anya military wing
- Marial Shayok – NBA player
- Alek Wek – model
- Anok Yai – Fashion Model and 2025 Model of the Year.
- Gout Gout – Sprinter
- Khaman Maluach – South Sudanese basketball player and 2025 top-10 NBA Draft pick.

== Dinka tribal groups ==
This list of Dinka tribal groupings by region. Note that these divisions are further divided into several subdivisions; for example, Dinka Rek is subdivided into Aguok, Kuac, and many other things, but they speak the same language; only the pronunciation is slightly different.

- Dinka Agar (Lakes State), Bahr El Ghazal
- Dinka Gok Lakes State Bahr El Ghazal
- Dinka Ciec (Lakes State), Bahr El Ghazal
- Dinka Aliab (Lakes State), Bahr El Ghazal
- Dinka Twic (Warrap State), Barh El Ghazal
- Dinka Rek (Warrap State, and parts of NBG and Western Barh El Ghazal), Bahr El Ghazal
- Dinka Luanyjang - Warrap State Bahr El Ghazal
- Dinka Malual (NBG), Bahr El Ghazal
- Dinka Ngok (Abyei, Malakal), Bahr El Ghazal
- Dinka Padang (Unity State), Upper Nile
- Dinka Bor (Upper Nile Region]), Jonglei
- Dinka Nyarweng, Jonglei
- Dinka Hol, Jonglei
- Dinka Twic East Jonglei
- Ruweng, (Unity State), Upper Nile
- Dongjol Malakal , Upper Nile

The number of Dinka sub-divisions is contested, as the border between groups, sub-divisions, and sections is blurred and often difficult to determine. The Atuot people can be divided into Apaak and Reel, Bor, Twic, Nyarweng and Hol and Panaruu into Awet and Kuel and Jieng into Ador and Lou.

The Dinka people have no centralised political authority. Instead their clans are independent but interlinked. Some traditionally provide ritual chiefs, known as the "masters of the fishing spear" or beny bith, who provide leadership and are at least in part hereditary.

== See also ==
- Sudanese nomadic conflicts
- Ethnic violence in South Sudan
- Dinka-Nuer conflict
