= John Frog =

South Sudanese musician

- Born: Aguek Michael Mahok Maming; Turalei, Southern Sudan
- Origin: Turalei, South Sudan
- Genres: Afro Beat; Hip Hop
- Occupations: Singer Songwriter; Artist
- Years active: 2014–present
- Member of: Guondo Gang

John Frog (born 1 January 1993) is a South Sudanese Afrobeat and Hip hop musician. He gained recognition for his hit song "Guondo Sakit," which became popular across East Africa.

== Early life ==
John Frog was born and raised in Turalei Payam in Warrap State, South Sudan to Michael Mahok Maming and Akuel Manyiel Akok. Both of John Frog's parents hail from Twic Mayardit County of Warrap State. He speaks his native language Dinka, Juba Arabic, English and some Kiswahili.

John Frog started his educational career in the early 2000s in Turalei at St. Joseph Primary School where he completed his primary education. He later moved to Juba in 2006.

Both his parents were soldiers in the Sudan People's Liberation Army (SPLA), and he was a child soldier, joining the army when he was around 10 and receiving his first firearm at 14.

Because of this background, John Frog did not have a smooth path completing his education in time, due to other factors, including the civil war which denied many South Sudanese children access to quality education. However, in 2014, John joined Juba Day Senior Secondary School where he completed his South Sudan Certificate of Secondary Education in 2018.

He was named Aguek, which means "frog", because he was a breech baby. Before embarking on his music career, he used to entertain his school colleagues and friends, often telling them he would become a big artist one day. He completed his secondary education before fully venturing into music.

== Engineer career ==
John Frog began his music career in the early 2010s. He rose to fame in 2018 when he released a solo single "Guondo Sakit," a phrase in Juba Arabic meaning "a common person" or "just a villager." The song's success marked his entry into the music scene and established him as one of the biggest artists in South Sudan. He also did a remix of "Guondo Sakit" with Harmonize from Tanzania.

=== Songs ===
Selected songs
No.	Title	Featured artist(s)	Notes	Reference
1	Mangmang	–	–	–
2	Bugatti	–	–	–
3	My Pillow	–	–	–
4	Mara Wahid	–	–	–
5	Jena	–	–	–
6	Kiir Arac	–	–	–
7	Binia Hilwa	–	–	–
8	Celebrate	–	–	–
9	Kurify	–	–	–
10	Junubi Asili	–	–	–
11	Konjo	–	–	–
12	Ashan Tani Mara	–	–	–
13	Kur Ajing	–	–	–
14	Biniade	Late Emma 47	Posthumous feature	–
15	Kebir Wara	–	–	–
16	Rabuna	T Manager	–	–
17	Action and Energy	–	–	–
18	Beledi	Jay Willz	–	–
19	My Bed	Iyanya	–	

=== Collaborations ===
John Frog has collaborated with various artists across Africa. Notable collaborations include:

- A remix of "Guondo Sakit" with Tanzanian star Harmonize, who discovered the song in a nightclub in Juba.
- A remix of "Action and Energy" with Ugandan star Eddy Kenzo, sponsored by businesswoman Suzan Tot. The remix significantly boosted Frog's profile in Africa.
- "Beledi" featuring Nigerian artist Jay Willz.
- "My Bed" featuring Nigerian artist Iyanya.
- Collaborations with Bahati from Kenya.
- "Rabuna" featuring South Sudanese singer T Manager.
- "Aye" featuring Ugandan Afrobeat artist Dr Jose Chameleone
- A remix of "Dhuengdu" with South Sudanese artist Slatine Pro

== Controversies ==
John Frog has been involved in a controversy with his first and former music manager, K2 (real name Koryom). K2 is credited with helping John Frog in his early music career but was later accused by Frog of using him for personal gain. Their public feud was eventually settled by K2's sister, businesswoman Achai Wiir.

In 2021, he also fell out with his then manager Lucky Charm over managerial grievance.

== National recognitions ==
From April to May 2023, John Frog was voted among the top 10 best artists in South Sudan by fans and recognized by Eye Radio.

== Nominations and awards ==
- A nomination for the African Muzik Magazine Awards and Music Festival (AFRIMMA) in the Best Male Artist - East Africa category alongside artists like Khaligraph Jones, Eddy Kenzo, Diamond Platnumz, and Rayvanny.
