= Mathiang Yak Anek =

Escaped slave and female Dinka chief

Mathiang Yak Anek (1860s - ?), was a 19th-century female Dinka chief and escaped slave. Born in the 1860s, she was enslaved as a child by Turkish-Egyptian traders and subjected to slavery in Sudan. She escaped during the advance of British colonial troops and returned to her home in Pathiong Gok (now part of South Sudan). She became the chief of her people. Following a dispute with a rival leader, she was removed from her position by colonial officials.

== Early life and enslavement ==
Mathiang Yak Anek was born in the 1860s to a Dinka family in the Pagok Pathiong Gok community of Turkish Sudan (now South Sudan). As a child, she was abducted from her village by Turkish-Egyptian traders and taken as a slave to the regional slaving post of Tonj.

Anek was sold and then taken north to Omdurman, the capital of the Mahdist State, where she was resold. She was forced to undergo female genital mutilation, a common experience for female slaves. For three years, she worked as a slave near Buri. She learned to speak Arabic and was informally married to a man in Northern Sudan.

== Escape from slavery and reign ==
Following the turbulence caused by the advance and the victories of the British colonial troops during the Anglo-Egyptian conquest of Sudan (1896–1899), Anek escaped from slavery in Sudan and returned to her home in Pathiong Gok where she resumed a traditional lifestyle. She married a man named Dahl Marol.

Anek gradually acquired stature among the Dinka of Pathiong Gok, convincing them of the worth of her knowledge of Arabic and her aggressive nature. She was eventually made a female chief and established residence in Rumbek, which had become a regional headquarters of the Anglo-Egyptian colonial administration. Anek initiated contact with colonial administrators and acted as a mediator between her people and agents of the foreign occupation. She was awarded a golden sword by a British officer for "keeping the peace" among the Gok Dinka.

== Deposition and later life ==
Anek clashed with Wuol Athian, a rival military leader and traditional priest of the Dinka community of Agar who had allied with the Nuer to attack the Turko-Egyptian garrison at Rumbek. At a gathering of the region's chiefs, Anek debated Athian, successfully made a public case against him, and was awarded a gray cow as recompense. The incident was considered dishonourable for Athian.

At the next annual gathering of chiefs before the British colonial officials, a charge was made against Anek claiming that she had slapped Athian on his buttocks. The charges were likely false, but considered a "grave offense". It was said that Athian was mobilising a war force to attack the Pathiong Gok. To resolve the situation, colonial officials stripped Anek of her chieftainship and appointed a man to be her successor.

Afterwards, Anek abandoned her house in the city and moved to the countryside. Following her rule, Gok had a higher rate of female chieftains than most groups of Dinka people.

== See also ==
- Anglo-Egyptian Slave Trade Convention
- Slavery in Sudan
