= Ataui Deng =

South Sudanese-American model

- Born: Ataui Deng; 3 November 1991 (age 34); Khartoum, Sudan
- Modeling information
- Height: 5 ft 10 in (1.78 m)
- Hair color: Brown
- Eye color: Dark Brown

Ataui Deng (born 3 November 1991) is a Sudanese American model who began her fashion career at the age of 17 in 2008. As the niece of Alek Wek, she began her career linked to her more famous aunt though her youth quickly became the aspect that the media focused on. She is from the South Sudan, and left for San Antonio, Texas, USA. She currently lives in San Antonio, TX.

== Early life ==
Deng was born in Khartoum in the Sudan. She escaped the Second Sudanese Civil War with her parents and immigrated to San Antonio, Texas.

== Career ==
She arrived in San Antonio at age 12, four years later she signed to Trump modelling agency and moved to New York. She debuted as a runway model in September 2008 for the spring Jeremy Laing, Kai Kuhne, L’Wren Scott, Proenza Schouler, and Zac Posen shows in New York. She was filmed by Jeremy Kost backstage at the Zac Posen show for New York magazine. She skipped the fashion weeks in Europe in 2008 in order to finish high school in Texas. She appeared in Teen Vogue several times. At age eighteen she became well known for having fallen on the runway for Z Spoke by Zac Posen.

=== Image ===
Ataui Deng forms part of a famous triumvirate of ethnic Dinka models, the other two are her aunt Alek Wek and her best friend Ajak Deng.

== Personal life ==
Deng is best friends with Australian Sudanese model Ajak Deng who has sometimes mistakenly been described as her sister. She is niece to the runway model Alek Wek. She currently lives in Brooklyn, New York. She was reported missing on 8 August 2014. On August 18, 2014, she was found in a New York hospital after being reported missing for 10 days.
