= Aiwel =

Dinka mythical hero

Aiwel (also known as Aiwel Longar or Ayuel) is a mythical hero that is considered the ancestor of the Bor and Dinka people of South Sudan.

== Representation ==
According to Asante and Mazama (2009), Aiwel was born from a water spirit father and a human mother. Like many other mythical heroes, Aiwel possessed spiritual powers and was able to perform miraculous feats.

The Pyramid of Pwom Ayuel is considered to be the burial place of Aiwel.

== Legends ==
=== Birth of Aiwel ===
According to Lynch and Roberts (2010), there are two versions of the myth depicting the birth of Aiwel. In the first version of the myth, Aiwel was born to a widowed woman weeping near the river. The widow wanted to have a son, but her husband died, and she now only has a daughter. The river deity saw what happened and decided to bless her with a son. As she emerged from the river, the widow became pregnant.

Not long after, the widow gave birth to a son, Aiwel. Though he was very recently birthed, Aiwel was already able to move around and communicate in complete sentences. The widow eventually found out Aiwel's talents. However, he warned her that she would die if she told anyone of what Aiwel can do. Unfortunately, she told someone, and death came for her. Aiwel grew up with his father following his mother's death. Eventually, he returned to his mother's village.

In the second version of the myth, the widow was on a stream with her daughter to catch a fish when a river deity splashed her. From then on, she became pregnant. It took eight years before she finally gave birth to Aiwel. The widow's daughter did not accept Aiwel as her brother because she deemed it impossible due to the widow's elderly age. Aiwel stayed in the village nonetheless, though he struggled to survive and became a pariah.
