= Takali =

Village in Maharashtra

Coordinates: 20°31′N 84°20′E

- village
- Location in Maharashtra, India Takali (India)
- Country: India
- State: Maharashtra
- District: Solapur district

Languages
  - Official: Marathi
- Time zone: UTC+5:30 (IST)

Takali is a village in the Karmala taluka of Solapur district in Maharashtra state, India.

== Demographics ==
Covering 1,179 hectares (2,910 acres) and comprising 500 households at the time of the 2011 census of India, Takali had a population of 2307. There were 1171 males and 1136 females, with 298 people being aged six or younger.
