= Nhialic =

Creator god in Dinka mythology

Nhialic is the supreme creator god of the Dinka pantheon, whose people now dwell in South Sudan. When used in the context of Dinka language, the term also can refer to the entirety of the gods within the Dinka pantheon. In some accounts, Nhialic is also known as Deng Dit.

== Representation ==
As a separate entity, Nhialic is a supreme creator god who dwells in the skies. Nhialic is referred to as male, although he does not have physical manifestations. Nhialic created the first humans as well as the universe and everything in it. In Dinka people's daily lives, natural phenomena that appear from the sky, such as rain and thunder, are considered a sign of Nhialic's presence on earth. Nhialic is considered the leader of the Dinka pantheon, yet, at the same time, the term “Nhialic” is often used to describe the influence of the Dinka pantheon as a whole.

== Family ==
According to Robert Tordiff Johnston (1934), many gods and goddesses of the Dinka pantheon are considered Nhialic's offsprings, with the following as the most notable:

- Ayum, goddess of the wind. She is often referred to as a force that prevents rain from falling.
- Alwet, goddess of the rain.
- Aja.
- Nyanngol, also known as Nyanwol or Nyancar, a female goddess.
- Gerrang, also known as Garang. Johnston (1934) described him as a malicious god who often leads humans to commit sins, while Lienhardt (1961) portrays him as a healer deity, though Lienhardt also confirms that the Dinka people tend to attribute misfortunes to Gerrang.
- Ayak, counterpart to Ayum, a female goddess.

Johnston's account slightly differs from Godfrey Lienhardt (1961), who views familial interpretation between the members of the Dinka pantheon as largely arbitrary when used by Western Dinka people. At the same time, however, he found that certain Dinka tribes living east of the Nile River had portrayed Gerrang as the son of Nhialic, and Deng as Gerrang's son.

== Myths ==
=== Creation of the first humans ===
It is said that Nhialic created the first humans from clay; the first man, Garang (different from Gerrang the deity), and Abuk, the first woman. They were originally a miniaturized form of present-day humans until Nhialic put them in pots and left them for quite some time. When they emerged from the pots, they became fully-grown humans.

=== Origin of death ===
Across all Dinka tribes, it is agreed that the heavens—represented by the sky—and earth used to be connected by a rope. However, this link was cut off due to the actions of the first humans, Garang and Abuk. To feed themselves, each day, Garang and Abuk were told by Nhialic to pound a certain amount of grain. They were not allowed to exceed this amount, since if they did so, the pounded grains will be thrown towards Nhialic.

One day, Abuk, driven by her greed, chose to pound more grains than she was told to. As have been forewarned by Nhialic, these grains ended up hitting him in the face, which he took offense at. In response, Nhialic sent out a blue bird to cut the rope that connected the heavens and earth. Since then, humans became mortal and had to feed themselves continuously to survive.

== See also ==
- Abuk
- Dinka religion
- List of African mythological figures
