= Mathiang Mathiang =

South Sudanese footballer (born 1994)

Personal information
- Full name: Mathiang Mathiang
- Date of birth: 19 September 1994 (age 32)
- Place of birth: Kassala, Sudan
- Position: Defender

Team information
- Current team: Sydenham Park

Senior career*
Years	Team	Apps	(Gls)
2014	Floreat Athena	1	(0)
2015–2017	Stirling Lions	36	(0)
2018	Heidelberg United	12	(0)
2019–2020	Brunswick City	10	(0)
2021–	Sydenham Park	1	(0)

International career^{‡}
2019–	South Sudan	2	(0)
- * Club domestic league appearances and goals as of 9 September 2021 ‡ National team caps and goals as of 9 September 2019

Mathiang Mathiang (born 19 September 1994) is a South Sudanese professional footballer who plays as a defender for Australian NPL Victoria 2 club Brunswick City SC and the South Sudan national team.
