= Abuk (mythology) =

African Lunar Goddess

Abuk is the first woman in the myths of the Dinka people of South Sudan and the Nuer of South Sudan and Ethiopia, who call her Buk or Acol. She is the only well-known female deity of the Dinka. She is also the patron goddess of women as well as gardens. Her emblem or symbols are, a small snake, the moon and sheep. She is the mother of the god of rain and fertility (Denka). The story from her birth to marriage and child-birth is:

She was born very small, when placed in a pot, she swelled like a bean.

Abuk and her mate, called Garang, were given one corn each to eat per day, by the creator god. This happened at the time when Abuk had finished growing.

The whole of all human people would have become famished if not for the fact Abuk went to steal the food the people needed.

The rain god, called Deng, was joined to Abuk in order that there might be an abundance in the land.

A daughter (Ai-yak) and two sons were born to them.
