= List of African deities and mythological figures =

List of spirits and deities in various traditional African religions

This is a list of African spirits as well as deities found within the traditional African religions. It also covers spirits as well as deities found within the African religions—which is mostly derived from traditional African religions. Additionally, prominent mythic figures including heroes and legendary creatures may also be included in this list.

== Akan ==
- Abu-Mehsu
- Amokye
- Anansi
- Asase Ya
- Bosomtwe
- Ntikuma
- Katarwiri
- Kwase Benefo
- Kweku Tsin
- Nyame
- Owuo
- Tano
- Abam Kofi

== Alur ==
- Jok Odudu

== Bambara ==
- Bemba
- Chiwara
- Duga
- Faro
- Kontron
- Muso Koroni
- Ndomadyiri
- Ninimini
- Sanen
- Suruku
- Teliko

== Baganda ==
- Katonda
- Ggulu
- Kibuka
- Kitaka
- Kiwanuka
- Mukasa
- Musisi
- Nambi
- Warumbe
- Wanema
- Wanga

== Bahumono ==
- Owazi

== Bakongo ==
- Bunzi
- Chicamassichinuinji
- Dinganga
- Funza
- Funzi
- Kalunga
- Kimbazi
- Kuitikuiti
- Lubangala
- Lusiemo
- Lusunzi
- Makanga
- Ma Kiela
- Mamba Muntu
- Mbantilanda
- Mbenza
- Mboze
- Mbumba
- Moni-Mambu
- Mpulu Bunzi
- Ngonda
- Ntangu
- Na Ngutu
- Nzambici
- Nzambi Ampungu
- Nzazi
- Nzumbi
- Simbi bia Maza

== Chagga ==
- Ruwa (god)

== Boloki ==
- Libanza
- Njambe

== Dahomey ==
- Agé
- Ayaba
- Da
- Gbadu
- Gleti
- Gu
- Lisa
- Loko
- Mawu
- Nana Buluku
- Salosteles
- Sakpata
- Xɛvioso
- Zinsi
- Zinsu

== Dinka ==
- Abuk
- Aiwel
- Deng
- Kejok
- Nhialic

== Efik ==
- Abassi
- Atai

== Ancient Egypt ==
- List of Egyptian deities

== Fang ==
- Mebege
- Nzame

== Fulani ==
- Baa-Wamnde
- Bâgoumâwel
- Bocoonde
- Buytoorin
- Celi
- Dandi
- Dumunna
- Foroforondu
- Ga
- Gorko-mawɗo
- Guéno
- Haɓɓana-koel
- Hammadi
- Kaidara
- Kiikala
- Koumbasara
- Koumen
- Lewru
- Naagara
- Naange
- Ndurbeele
- Neɗɗo
- Neɗɗo-mawɗo
- Njeddo Dewal
- Nounfayiri
- Rongo
- Silé Sadio
- Sitti
- Tongo
- Tooke
- Tyanaba

== Gikuyu ==
- Ngai

== Hausa ==
- Bayajida
- Gizo

== Igbo ==
- Aha Njoku
- Ala
- Amadioha
- Agwu
- Anyanwu
- Chukwu
- Ekwensu
- Ikenga
- Nmuo Mmiri or Nne Mmiri.
- Ogbunabali

== Ijo ==
- Egbesu
- Ogboinba
- Ozidi
- Woyengi

== Kissi ==
- Kuino

== Khoikhoi ==
- Gaunab
- Heitsi-eibib
- Tsui'goab

== Klassikans ==
- M'JUA MKUU

== Krachi ==
- Ogboinba
- Owuo
- Wulbari

== Lotuko ==
- Ajok

== Lugbara ==
- Adroa
- Adroanzi

== Luhya ==
- Nyasaye
- Were Khakaba

== Lunda ==
- Zombi

== Maasai ==
- Neiterkob
- Ngai

== Mbundu ==
- Kabundungulu
- Kalunga-Ngombé
- Kimanaueze
- Kishi
- Kianda
- Musisi
- Sudika-Mbambi

== Nubian ==
- Amesemi
- Amanete
- Amon
- Apedemak
- Arensnuphis
- Ariten
- Aqedise
- Bes
- Breith
- Dedun
- Mash
- Merul
- Mehit
- Menhit
- Miket
- Makedeke
- Sebiumeker

== Nuer ==
- Kwoth

== Nyanga ==
- Kahindo
- Kasiyembe
- Katee
- Kentse
- Kiruka
- Kitundukutu
- Kubikubi
- Mbura
- Mitandi
- Mpaca
- Mukiti
- Muisa
- Musoka
- Mweri
- Mwindo
- Nkuba
- Ntumba
- Nyamurairi
- Ongo
- Yana

== Oromo ==
- Waaq

== Pygmy ==
- Arebati
- Khonvoum

== Sawar ==
- Jengu

== Serer ==
- Roog
- Koox
- Kopé Tiatie Cac
- Kokh Kox
- Takhar

== Shona ==
- Musikavanhu
- Nyadenga
- Nyami Nyami

== Somali ==
- Waaq

== Songhai ==
- Dongo
- Faran Baru Koda
- Faran Maka Bote
- Fono
- Harakoy Dikko
- Irikoy
- Kyirey
- Manda Hausakoy
- Moussa Gname
- Moussa Nyawri
- Nana Miriam
- N'Debbi
- Nyaberi
- Zaberi

== Sotho ==
- Modimo
- Ditaolane

== Tumbuka ==
- Chiuta

== Yoruba ==
- Aganju
- Aja
- Babalu Ayé
- Eṣu
- Erinle
- Elegua
- Ibeji
- Nana
- Ọba
- Ọbatala
- Ogun
- Oko
- Olokun
- Ọlọrun
- Osanyin
- Oṣun
- Oṣosi
- Oṣumare
- Ori
- Ọrunmila
- Ọya
- Ṣango
- Yemọja

== Venda ==
- Huveane
- Tharu

== Xhosa ==
- uThixo
- Qamata
- Hlakanyana
- Amagqirha
- Tikoloshe

== Zulu ==
- Hlakanyana
- Inkosazana
- Nomkhubulwane
- Unkulunkulu
- Umvelinqangi
- Uncama
- Tikoloshe
- Wane the warning god

== See also ==
- Alusi
- List of Egyptian deities
- Loa
- Nkisi
- Orisha
- West African Mythology
- Winti
- Zangbeto
