= Uncama =

Uncama is a mythical hero in the Zulu traditional religion. He is known for his journey to the underworld and subsequent return upon discovering it.

== Representation ==
Depiction of Uncama is mainly attributed to his underworld experience, which he underwent due to his anger at a porcupine who had been messing with his millet garden. It is known that he had a wife, though her name is not disclosed in his myths.

== Journey to the underworld ==
Uncama lived in a village with his wife and took care of his millet garden daily. One day, he found out that his millets, which are supposed to be ready for harvest, had all been eaten by a porcupine. This continued for several days, and Uncama became increasingly angry towards the porcupine.

After a while, he decided that he’s going to wake up as early as he could and follow the porcupine back to where it came from. He managed to do this with the help of the morning dew. In one version, Uncama followed the trail of the porcupine by finding the path where the morning dew has already been disturbed.

At the end of the porcupine’s trail, Uncama found a hole in the ground. He thought it was a shallow burrow, but as he descended, no end seemed to be in near sight. Finally, he reached the end of the hole, and he discovered a village, with children crying and smoke rising. Uncama was terrified that he may have found himself in a hostile area, so he fled.

Uncama eventually managed to return to his village. When the villagers and his wife saw him, they were surprised, since they thought that Uncama had died and had already buried all of his things in place of his body.

== See also ==
- Kwase Benefo
- Uhlakanyana
- Zulu traditional religion
