= Uhlanga =

Mythological location

In Zulu mythology, Uhlanga is the marsh from which humanity was born, and is the Zulu word for "reed" that was also a synonym for "societal custom".

== Myths ==
Myths about Uhlanga are linked to myths about Unkulunkulu and Umvelinqangi, and there are different, conflicting mythical traditions about all three.

According to Jacob Olupona, Umvelingangi wedded himself to Uhlanga, likely because of Uhlanga's multiple-colored reeds. Umvelingangi used the reeds to create men and women called Unkulunkulu, who each founded a tribe.
