= Kejok (mythological figure) =

Dinka mythological figure

Kejok is a mythic hero figure in the traditional religion of the Dinka people, who dwell in present-day Sudan.

== Representation ==
Kejok was a man who was able to perform miracles. He was born to a Dinka mother, though he is a product of immaculate conception. Kejok had a brother named Menyang, though it is unknown if they share a father.

== Legend ==
Kejok was supposedly born in the 1700s. His mother, Quay, suddenly became pregnant with Kejok after she visited a pool at Korather, near Shambe. This pool is associated with the ancestor of the Dinka, Desheik. At the time, Quay was married to Cheng, a member of the Akorbil clan of the Dinka.

Quay gave birth to Kejok after she was pregnant for a mere few days. Like other culture heroes, Kejok became a full-grown man in a matter of months and was capable of performing miraculous feats. He was able to heal blind people and produce water just by tapping the ground with his palms.

Kejok had a brother named Menyang. He was envious of Kejok's abilities and accused him of witchcraft. Eventually, a scuffle broke out due to Menyang's accusation. Kejok wanted to keep the peace, so he left the people of Dinka. His last words were that he will return to his father, God, and will come back to the people of Dinka in the future.

== See also ==
- Ditaolane
- Heitsi-eibib
- List of African mythological figure
