= The Rough Guide to Highlife =

Compilation album by Various artists
- Released: 4 February 2003
- Genre: World, Highlife
- Length: 64:33
- Label: World Music Network

Full series chronology
Unwired: Europe (2003)	The Rough Guide to Highlife (2003)	The Rough Guide to the Music of the Alps (2002)

The Rough Guide to Highlife is a world music compilation album originally released in 2003. Part of the World Music Network Rough Guides series, the release covers the Highlife musical genre of Ghana and surrounding countries, focusing on the 1960s and 70s. Graeme Ewens wrote the liner notes, and Phil Stanton, co-founder of the World Music Network, was the producer. This album was followed by a second edition in 2012.

== Critical reception ==
Professional ratings
Review scores
Source	Rating
Robert Christgau	A-
AllMusic	4/5 stars

The compilation's release was met with positive reviews. Robert Christgau called it less even than the contemporaneous The Highlife All-Stars album Sankofa but "eccentric" nonetheless. He went on to name it the twelfth best album of 2003 in the annual Pazz & Jop poll.

Writing for AllMusic, Chris Nickson called it a "treasure trove" as more than half the album's tracks had been previously unavailable.

== Track listing ==
No.	Title	Artist	Length
1.	"Igede"	Celestine Ukwu	4:06
2.	"Ka-Anyi Jikota"	Chief Stephen Osita Osadebe	5:07
3.	"Ekombi"	Jerry Hansen (musician) & The Ramblers Dance Band	3:12
4.	"Bosoe"	Joe Mensah	9:36
5.	"Guitar Boy"	Victor Uwaifo	5:20
6.	"Bone Biara So Wo Akatua"	Nana Ampadu & The African Brothers	4:24
7.	"Asare"	Alex Konadu	4:58
8.	"Esonta"	Inyang Henshaw	3:11
9.	"Medzi Medzi"	E.T. Mensah	2:54
10.	"Omo Pupa"	Victor Olaiya
11.	"Ohia Asoma Wo"	King Onyina	2:46
12.	"Bere Bote"	Rex Lawson	2:56
13.	"Agyeman Baidoo"	T.O. Jazz	4:14
14.	"Binu Binu"	Orlando Julius	2:54
15.	"Hilife Time"	George Darko	6:07
