= Tuffour =

Tuffour is an Akan surname. Notable people with the surname include:

- Dennis Tuffour (born 1989), English rugby league player
- Emmanuel Tuffour (born 1966), Ghanaian sprinter
- Nana Tuffour (1954–2020), Ghanaian singer and songwriter
