= Ngewo =

Supreme God in Mende mythology

Ngewo (Ngewɔ in Mende) is the supreme creator god of the people of Mende from Sierra Leone.

== Representation ==
Ngewo is a combined deity from the male god Ngewo and the female goddess Leve, who predated Ngewo as the supreme creator god honored by the Mende people. These two gods are now worshipped together under Ngewo, with Leve considered as his consort. Ngewo is a sky god, responsible for creating the universe, and is in charge of determining earth's natural phenomena. He is popularly depicted as a distant deity, who does not concern himself with the day-to-day goings of his worshippers. However, in certain myths, Ngewo tends to punish those who forget to pray to him as well as those who do not pay tribute to him. He communicates with the Mende people through the help of their ancestors’ spirits, dyinyinga, who also demand certain food offerings.

== Legends ==
=== Creation of the first human ===
Ngewo originally lived alone on earth in a cave. One day, he wanted company, so he started creating animals, in a female-male pair. Eventually, he created the first man and the first woman. Ngewo gave his creations freedom to ask him of anything, which backfired after a while. He was overwhelmed with their requests and retreated to the heavens, where he had lived since then.

=== Origin of death ===
Ngewo gave two messages to be received by the Mende people and told two animals, the toad and the dog, to send these messages to earth. The dog was entrusted with telling humans that they will not die, while the toad would bring a message foretelling their death instead. Unfortunately, the toad arrived first, since the dog was distracted. Thus, death became humanity's fate.

== See also ==
- List of African mythological figures
