= Wulbari (god) =

Wulbari is a supreme deity figure worshipped in the traditional religions of the Krache and Guang people in Ghana and Togo. Aside from his role as a supreme deity, Wulbari is a sky god, where he lived ever since he retreated from Earth. He is also often depicted as the foil to the spider god Anansi.

== Legends ==
=== Retreat from earth ===
There are several versions of the folktale that led to Wulbari’s retreat from earth to the skies, which represented heavens. Lynch and Roberts (2010) laid out several of these accounts:

1. A woman who was pounding her pestle caused Wulbari pain, since her motions hit him. So, Wulbari kept going higher to escape the pain and eventually arrived at the skies.
2. Wulbari was used as a towel for human’s soiled hands.
3. Earth became too crowded and Wulbari left for the skies to escape the masses.
4. The smoke of the cooking fire annoyed Wulbari greatly, and he decided to move to the skies.
5. Wulbari was cut to pieces by a woman who used him as a seasoning, and so he left earth.

=== Origin of death ===
A hornbill bird called Animabri started killing and eating mankind. Wulbari called on his court to decide on what to do next. The court, represented by animals, was later by Wulbari to name their people and their place. The elephant controlled the far countryside – and thus the lands are under its control. The goat stated that they have dominion over the grasslands. The dog claimed the humans, and thus Wulbari put him in charge of the medicine that would revive those that have been killed by Animabri.

Unfortunately, in his journey to deliver the medication to the humans, the dog became hungry and left the medicine on the roadside while he feasted on a bone. The goat snatched the medicine and poured it all over the grasses. Thus, mankind die and cannot return to life, while the grasses that die each season shall return to life in the next season.

== See also ==
- Nyame
- Abassi
- List of African mythological figures
