= Zulu traditional religion =

Traditional religion of the Zulu people

Zulu traditional religion consists of the beliefs and spiritual practices of the Zulu people of southern Africa. It is monotheistic with Unkulunkulu known to be the Supreme Creator of the heavens and the earth. While other spirits like Nomkhubulwane who are responsible for the earth's fertility exist, Zulu people do not pray to these spirits. The heads of honesteads use incense to speak to their ancestors who they believe their spirits are now sitting besides the creator god, and can talk to him on their behalf.

== Beliefs ==
=== The Creator and the ancestors ===
Similar to other Bantu religions, adherents of Zulu traditional religion believe in honoring ancestors (Amathongo & amadlozi) and God (uNkulunkulu/uMenzi). These beliefs are passed down orally through stories across generations. While the details of these stories may vary, they generally share the same themes, such as that the human world and the spirit world are interconnected, with divination practices used to bridge these realms. The roles and relationship of the creator, uMvelinqangi/uNkulunkulu/uMenzi, the highest god and creator of the universe, often change depending on the version of the story.

UmkhuluwoMkhulu ("the greatest one") was created in Uhlanga, a huge swamp of reeds, before he came to Earth. Individuals base their morality or behavior ethics on his judgment or “apprehension of the Ultimate Reality.”

Unkulunkulu is sometimes conflated with the sky god Umvelinqangi (meaning "he who was in the very beginning"), the god of thunder, earthquake whose other name is Unsondo, and is the son of Unkulunkulu, the Father, and Nomkhubulwane, the Mother.

The word nomkhubulwane means the one who shapeshifts into any form of an animal. Another name given for the supreme being Umkhuluwomkhulu is uSomandla, the ultimate source of all existence. European settlers used the word Unkulunkulu in order to try to explain their belief in the God of the bible to the people of Zululand.

According to Irvin Hexham (1981), "there is no evidence of belief in a heavenly deity or sky god in Zulu religion before the advent of Europeans". However, other scholars such as Eileen Jensen Krige, Isaac Schapera, Axel-Ivar Berglund (1976), Hammond-Took, and John Mbiti disagree with Hexham's analysis. They argue that the "lord of heaven" or Zulu sky god has always existed in the traditional Zulu belief system, a deity who they argue is greater than the "archetypal ancestor and creator, Unkulunkulu".

=== Other deities ===
- Nomhoyi/Mamlambo, the goddess of rivers
- Nomkhubulwane, sometimes called the Zulu Demeter, who is a goddess of the rainbow, agriculture, rain and beer (which she invented)
- Inkosazana, another fertility goddess
- uNgungi, the deity of the blacksmiths
- iNyanga the Moon goddess is associated with healers who are called IziNyanga, the word nyanga is a Zulu word for the Moon
- Sonzwaphi the deity of healing
- Ukhulukhulwana (or UkhuluKhukwan) a star being ancestor who came from the stars and found the ancient Zulus living like animals and without laws. He taught them to build huts and taught them the high laws of isiNtu. The word unkulunkulu is suspected to be a corruption of the word umkhuluwomkhulu.

== See also ==
- Bantu religion
- List of African deities
- Traditional African religions
- Usiququmadevu

== Notes and references ==
- Lynch, Patricia Ann; Roberts, Jeremy (2010). African Mythology, A to Z. Infobase Publishing. p. 138.
