= List of Efik deities =

The following is a list of gods and goddesses from Efik mythology.

== Supreme being ==
The Supreme God is known as Abasi. He is regarded as the father of all things. In some narratives, he is regarded as a member of a trinity which consists of Ibom Enọ, Abasi Ibom and Inyañ Ibom.

== Ndem ==
=== National deities ===
- Ekpenyọñ - One of the most popular cults in the lower Cross river region. Ekpenyong is regarded as the custodian of Nsibidi.
- Ekanem - Ekanem is often worshipped alongside Ekpenyong but the worship of Ekanem was not as wide-spread as the worship of Ekpenyong.

=== Communal deities ===
Communal deities are deities worshipped by a number of Efik families and houses. These deities have no affiliation with specific families but are guardians of the individual towns of Old Calabar.

- Anansa Ikañ Obutọñ - She is regarded as the deity of Obutong. She originally belonged to the Enwang clan. She is believed to reside at the head of a spring or river near the former site of Obutong by the Hope Waddell Training Institute.
- Ukọñ Esuk - He is regarded as the deity of Adiabo
- Anantigha Enwañ - Anantigha Enwang is a male deity who originally belonged to the Enwang people.
- Sunko Monko - The deity for Nsidung (Henshaw town).
- Afia añwan - Prior to the prominence of Anansa in the religious life of the Efik of Iboku, Afia anwan was believed to be the central deity of the Efik. The Eniong people equally worshipped Afia anwan.
- Atabru Inyañ - Deity of the Effiat people. Worshipped by the Efik and the Effiatt.

=== Family deities ===
Some deities were the guardians of specific families and houses in Old Calabar.

- Musaha idem anwan mmọñ - Worshipped by Etim Efiom house of Old Calabar
- Uyai nkan uyai - Worshipped by Etim Efiom house of Old Calabar
- Esierekob - Worshipped by Etomkpe Yellow Duke house of Old Calabar

• Asa-anwan - Ufok/Ikot Umo Edem of Cross River State

=== Other marine deities ===
- Asari Mandu - A river goddess located at Ifondo river in Akpabuyo Local Government Area.
- Ebebe - Wife of Ukong Esuk
- Akpa Uyọk - An Efik Ndem Priest who E.U. Aye asserts became part of the host of Ndem Efik.
- Udom Inyañ - regarded as the deity of wealth who lives at the bottom of the Calabar river.
- Akpando - Deity located at Ikot Esu
- Ukim ita - Deity located at Ikot Esu
- Asari Anyando - Deity located at Creek Town
- Esiet obom - Deity located at Creek town
- Afia Anwa - Deity located at Creek town
- Ikọñ Usinibo Nne
- Eka Asari
- Ekarabitiad
- Amia Nkanika
- Oworoba
- Inyañ Edini
- Ekanem Unan
- Akpan Ekpe Uyọñ
- Ewa Okon
- Otokpa Udia Inyañ
- Ifiaya
- Ọfiọñ Abia
- Uman Enañ
- Nkọñinua Akpa Efik
- Obo Iwomen
- Afia anwan Esuk Ekondo

• Eme

== Pre-Ndem era deities ==
- Atai - Atai is believed to be the wife of Abasi. She is regarded as the messenger of Abasi and the goddess of death.
- Obuma - Goddess of thunder

== See also ==
- Efik mythology

== Bibliography ==
- Akak, Eyo Okon (1982), Efiks of Old Calabar: Culture and Superstitions, vol. III, Calabar: Akak & Sons, OCLC 773255520
- Akoda, Winifred E.; Akoda, Philip (2021), Groundwork of Eniong Abatim History (1670-2020), Ibadan: University Press PLC., ISBN 9789789408863, OCLC 1371899096
- Aye, Efiong U. (1967), Old Calabar through the centuries, Calabar: Hope Waddell Press, OCLC 476222042
- Essien, Dominic (1993), Uruan people in Nigerian history, Uyo: Modern business press Ltd., ISBN 9782676217
- Etifit, Edet Solomon (1979), Aspects of the Pre-Colonial History of Enwang in Oron Local Government Area (BA), University of Nigeria, Nsukka
- Goldie, Hugh (1862), Dictionary of the Efik Language, in two parts. I-Efik and English. II-English and Efik, Glassgow: Dunn and Wright
- Hackett, Rosalind I. J. (1989), Religion in Calabar: The religious life and history of a Nigerian town, Berlin: Mouton de Gruyter, OCLC 470747014
- Okon, Esien-Ekpe E. (1985), N̄kukun̄kpọyọriyọ, Ibadan: Evans bros., OCLC 21071129
- Savage, Olayinka Margaret (1985), The Efik Political System: The Effervescence of Traditional Offices (PhD), University of Manchester
- Scheub, Harold (2000), A dictionary of African mythology: the mythmaker as storyteller, Oxford; New York: Oxford University Press, ISBN 0195124561
- Simmons, Donald C. (1958), Analysis of the Reflection of Culture in Efik folktales (PhD), Yale University
- Waddell, Hope Masterton (1863), Twenty-Nine Years in the West Indies and Central Africa, London: Nelson & Sons, OCLC 862147545
