= Kishi (folklore) =

Two-faced demon in Angolan folklore

A kishi (plural: makishi) is a man-eating, many-headed creature with long, tangled hair that falls over its face, recorded in the folklore of the Ambundu people in Angola. According to one legend, there was a kishi chief who had the ability to regrow his head as soon as it is cut off. Makishi appear in the legend of Sudika-mbambi, where they destroyed Kimanaueze's village and massacred the people.

The word kishi, nkishi, or mukisi means "spirit" in several Bantu languages spoken in Democratic Republic of the Congo, Republic of the Congo, northern Angola, and parts of western Zambia.
