= Nyambe (name) =

Lozi masculine given name and surname

- Pronunciation: ˈɲambe
- Gender: Masculine

Origin
- Word/name: Africa
- Meaning: Supreme Being

Other names
- Derivatives: Njambe; Njambi; Nyame; Nyambi; Nyembi; Nzambi; Nzambe; Nzemi

Nyambe is a masculine given name and surname of African origin, particularly among Bantu-speaking peoples. The name Nyambe means "Supreme Being" and is especially common among the Lozi people of Southern Africa.

In traditional African religions, Nyambe is regarded as the Supreme Being, the Creator of the world, and the source of all life. He is often described as all-powerful, all-knowing, and above all things. While different African cultures use various names for the Creator, Nyambe is widely honoured as the one true God, who watches over creation like a loving father.

== Surname ==
- Dora Moono Nyambe (1992–2024), Zambian humanitarian, educator, and TikToker
- Patrick Kakozi Nyambe (born 2002), Zambian sprinter
- Prisca Matimba Nyambe (born 1951), Zambian judge
- Ryan Nyambe (born 1997), Namibian footballer

== Given name ==
- Nyambe Mulenga (born 1987), Zambian former footballer

== See also ==
- Nyambe, African deity

== Sources ==
- Mbiti, John S. (1990). African Religions & Philosophy. Heinemann. ISBN 978-0-435-90215-4.
- Thorpe, Simon A. (1991). African Traditional Religions. Heinemann. ISBN 978-0-435-90224-6.
- MacGaffey, Wyatt (1986). Religion and Society in Central Africa: The BaKongo of Lower Zaire. University of California Press. ISBN 978-0-520-06215-2.
- Parrinder, Geoffrey (1974). African Traditional Religion. Praeger. ISBN 978-0-8371-2124-2.
- "Lozi – Nyambe pronunciation". Wikimedia Commons.
