= Heitsi-eibib =

Heitsi-eibib, also known as Geitsi or Haitse-aibeb, is a mythic hero figure in the mythology of the Khoikhoi people, He is sometimes depicted as a trickster, and with Gaunab and Tsui’goab, is a central figure in Khoikhoi folklore. Beyond his shapeshifting, Heitsi-eibib is cast as a trickster in Khoikhoi stories: he is a deceiver, repeatedly resurrected, and not above immorality or other transgressions from time to time. These latter stories go well beyond hero motifs in his character and represent deeper cultural lessons in Khoikhoi mythology.

== Representation ==
In his depictions, Geitsi-eibib sometimes appears as either a full-grown adult or a child. In one folklore, the child Geitsi-eibib became an adult and had sexual intercourse with his mother, then suddenly turned into a baby at the end. Even as an adult, he is a well-known shapeshifter, as his figure changes from one story to another.

All though Geitsi-eibib is a mythological figure, he had many real-life tombs in the form of cairns located in South Africa and Namibia.

== Legends ==
=== Defeating Ga-Gorib ===
Ga-Gorib is a monster associated with Gaunab, the god of the underworld in Khoikhoi mythology. Ga-Gorib often challenges people to throw a stone at his forehead while he sat at the edge of a big and deep hole on the ground. However, if anyone takes up his challenge, only certain death awaits since the stone would bounce back and kill the person who threw it. In addition to his mythic deeds on earth, Heitsi-eibib is also connected with celestial bodies, including the sun and moon. These associations highlight his significance within Nama Khoikhoi cosmology and his role as a spiritual figure tied to both terrestrial and cosmic realms.

It is said that Heitsi-eibib discovered these deaths and decided to defeat Ga-Gorib by slaying him. So, Heitsi-eibib went to the Ga-Gorib’s location, where the latter immediately challenged Heitsi-eibib to throw a stone at his forehead. Heitsi-eibib refused to rise to the provocation and distracted Ga-Gorib enough to hit him behind his ear. Ga-Gorib was surprised and lost his balance and fell into the deep hole.

In another version, Ga-Gorib chased after Heitsi-eibib when he refused the challenge, and they had a fight after both of them fell into the pit. Just like the first version, Ga-Gorib died, while Heitsi-eibib lived on.

== See also ==
- List of African mythological figures
