= Wanga (mythology) =

Wanga is a member of the Baganda pantheon of gods or balubaale, and is associated with divination and health. He is said to be one of the first Baganda heroes to ascend into godhood.

== Representation ==
Wanga is considered as one of the oldest members of the balubaale.

== Family ==
Wanga is the son of Wadda and Bukulu. Bukulu was created by Katonda and descended to earth with Kintu. Wanga is the third child of Wadda and Bukulu and has two other siblings; Musisi, another member of the balubaale who is associated with the earthquake phenomenon, and Laba.

== Myths ==
=== The temple of Wanga ===
It was said that the Sun once fell from the sky. This caused darkness to befall upon the world, and the king of Baganda requested the help of Wanga, who at the time resided in Ssese Islands. Wanga decided to lend his aid, and set out to Baganda. Then, he returned the Sun to its rightful position. As a reward, the king of Baganda built a temple in his honor. Another interpretation of the myth detailed that the Moon also fell from the sky and Wanga also had to return the Moon to its original location.

== See also ==
- Ggulu
- List of African mythological figures
- Warumbe
