= Nana Tuffour =

Ghanaian musician (1954–2020)

- Born: James Kwaku Tuffour; 14 February 1954
- Died: 15 June 2020 (aged 66)
- Genre: Highlife
- Occupations: Singer, songwriter
- Years active: 1979–2020

Nana Tuffour (né James Kwaku Tuffour; 14 February 1954 – 15 June 2020), also known as 9-9-2-4, was a Ghanaian Highlife singer and songwriter. He is known for popular highlife songs such as Aketekyiwa, Abeiku and Owuo sei fie and had 15 albums to his credit.

== Life and career ==
Nana Tuffour is a native of Kumasi. He started his musical career with keyboardist Alex Konadu, and joined the Wanto Wazuri Band as a pianist. He later became the lead vocalist for the Waza Africo Band, and also released his first album yes Highlife Romance in 1979. Nana traveled to Nigeri, and worked with King Sunny Adé as his keyboardist.

Tuffour died from COVID-19 in 2020.
