= Njambe =

- God of Creation
- Venerated in: Bantu mythology
- Symbols: Sun
- Ethnic group: Boloki • Bantu

Equivalents
- Roman: Jupiter
- Bakongo: Nzambi Mpungu
- Igbo: Chukwu
- Egyptian: Amun-Ra
- Bantu: Nyambe
- Akan: Nyame

Njambe is the supreme creator god figure in the traditional religion of the Loki or Boloki people, who are primarily based in the Democratic Republic of Congo. According to anthropologist John H. Weeks, Njambe is also used to refer to a deity associated with sickness and death [2]. He is prominent in Boloki myths regarding the origin of death [1] [3].

== Representation ==
According to Weeks, Njambe is one of the names used to refer to the supreme god-figure worshipped by the Boloki people. In total, Weeks found that there were four commonly used names to refer to a supreme god figure, which may be represented by different or same deities:

1. Libanza, described as the creator of all things. Libanza is also the mythic hero figure of the Boloki people.
2. Nzakomba, described as the mythological figure responsible for determining the thoughts and hearts of humans and animals. The people of Lulanga in Malwai also use this name to refer to god.
3. Kombu, described as a creator god of people with mental illness and disabilities.
4. Njambe, described as a god responsible for sickness and death. The word may be a variant of the word Nzambi or Nyambi, which is used by the people of Bobangi in reference to a supreme deity.

The name Njambe is also used by the Kuba people of the Democratic Republic of Congo to describe their supreme creator figure.

== Legends ==
=== Origin of death ===
It is said that Njambe once took a form of a small man and appeared in front of a human. The human is a villager who was working in the forest. When Njambe encountered the villager, he offered two bundles that the villager can choose to take home. The first bundle is large and contained trinkets such as knives, beads, and mirrors. The second bundle is much smaller and had immortal life inside.

The villager, who did not know who Njambe was, told him that he could not make the decision himself. So, he brought the two bundles home to his village and asked for the other villagers’ opinions. The female villagers saw and tried out the trinkets in the larger first bundle. Later, they chose to leave the second bundle. Thus, Njambe took the bundle carrying the immortal life away, and death became a state experienced by all humans.

== See also ==
- List of African mythological figures
