= Mebege =

Supreme god of the Fang people of the Central African Republic

Mebege (also called Nzeme and Mbere) is the Supreme God of the Fang people of the Central African Republic.

== Cosmology ==
=== First oral tradition ===
Nzeme (or Mebege) is believed to have created everything in the universe and blew life into the Earth and Zambe, the first ancestor. It is also said that Nzeme created three spirits: Nzame with strength; Mbere with leadership, and Nkwa with beauty.

=== Second oral tradition ===
According to oral tradition, Mebege is the Creator God. He was originally alone in the universe, with a spider named Dibobia as his only company hanging above the primordial waters of the universe. Mebege created the earth on the suggestion of Dibobia. He gave several strands of his right underarm hair, a part of his brain, and a smooth stone and turned them into an egg. Then, Dibobia put the egg into the sea. After some time, Mebege put semen of the egg; it cracked open and three deities came out, and the firstborn, Zame ye Mebege, became the leader of the pantheon.

Zame ye Mebege was associated with masculine energy and the sun. Nyingwan Mebege, the secondborn and his sister, was associated with fertility, feminine energy, and the moon. Nlona Mebege, the youngest and his brother, was associated with evil. Mebege gave Zame instructions on how to create the earth and once he succeeded, Mebege and Dibobia left Zame in charge of the earth, while they both ascended to the heavens.

== See also ==
- List of African deities
