= Kabundungulu =

Ambundu mythological figure, twin brother of Sudika-mbambi

Kabundungdulu is the twin brother of Sudika-mbambi and is an Ambundu mythological figure. He is part of an origin myth for thunderstorm, where he represents the sound of a thunder’s echo.

Kabundungdulu was the second-born, and spoke to his mother at the womb, just like his older twin. When Sudika-mbambi went on his quest to kill the monsters (makishi) who was responsible for the destruction of their childhood home prior to their births and the murder of their grandfather, Kabundungdulu stayed with their parents.

Later, when Sudika-mbambi was dying from mortal wounds sustained in his battle to win the hand of the underworld god’s daughter, Kabundungdulu saved him. However, Kabundungdulu, who did not have any wives, asked his brother for one of his. Sudika-mbambi refused and they both went on separate ways after neither managed to win a fight over the other.
