= The Ozidi Saga =

The Ozidi Saga is a choreographed folklore epic performed as part of the oral history of the Ijaw of the Niger River Delta.

It is traditionally performed as a periodic festival honoring the folk hero Ozidi. The performance dramatizes key episodes in the myth danced in a nonlinear narrative, allowing a ritual officiant dressed in white and holding objects traditionally identified with the hero to solicit participation by acolytes and members of the audience. A performance in 1966 was filmed and later transcribed and translated by playwright and poet John Pepper Clark.
