= Ebun Clark =

Nigerian professor of theatre arts

- Born: Ebun Odutola
- Occupation: Academic
- Known for: Theatre arts
- Notable work: Hubert Ogunde: The Making of the Nigerian Theatre
- Spouse: John Pepper Clark

Ebun Clark (née Odutola) is an academic and the first Nigerian professor in the field of theatre arts.

== Biography ==
Clark was born into the Odutola family of Ijebuland. Her father was Jimoh Odutola, a businessman and Adeola Odutola's younger brother.

She studied speech and voice at Rose Bruford College of Theatre and Performance, Sidcup, London.

She was one of the pioneering lecturers of the school of drama at the University of Ibadan in 1963. In 1965, she moved to the department of English at the University of Lagos and was appointed the director of the centre for cultural studies in 1983. She retired from the university in 1991.

She met John Pepper Clark, a Nigerian poet who was then a research fellow at the Institute of African Studies of the University of Ibadan while she was lecturing at the School of Drama. They married on 4 April 1964 in a low key ceremony in Cotonu, Benin Republic. Her family stood against her marriage to JP Clark because of ethnic differences as she was Ijebu from southwestern Nigeria while he was Ijaw from the Niger-Delta. On account of this, they eloped in Cotonu.

Her research around Hubert Ogunde and his work was sponsored by the University of Leeds.

She cofounded PEC Reparatory Theatre in 1982 in Lagos with JP Clark.

== Bibliography ==
- Hubert Ogunde: The Making of the Nigerian Theatre (1979)
