= Nzame =

Deity

Nzame is the supreme creator god featured in the mythologies of the Fang people of Equatorial Guinea, Gabon, and Cameroon. The name is used to refer to a trinity of deities, which included Nzame, Mebere and Nkwa and is also used in reference to Nzame, one of the members of this trinity.

== Representation ==
As the trinity of gods, Nzame is in charge of creating the universe and everything in it. As one of the three deities, Nzame manages the heavenly bodies, Mebere and Nkwa are in charge of the female and male aspects of creation, which include certain traits such as leadership (Mebere) and beauty (Nkwa).

== Legend ==
=== Creation of the first human ===
After the members of the trinity, Nzame, created the universe, Mebere and Nkwa suggested to Nzame that they chose a leader for the newly created earth. At first, three animals were picked to lead earth: the elephant, the leopard, and the monkey. However, Nzame disagreed and so three gods created the first human, Fam. Fam was originally a lizard created by Mebere, who after eight days, turned into the first man on earth. He was gifted with abilities from all three gods and was told to rule the earth. The three gods then returned to the heavens.

Unfortunately, after a certain amount of time had passed, it was discovered that Fam was a cruel leader, who oppressed the animals on earth. Fam also decided to turn his back on Nzame, who eventually found what happened. In response, Nzame destroyed everything on earth—except for Fam, who was bestowed with immortality. Fam was never seen again afterwards, although he still lived. He later became a malevolent mythological figure who preyed on other humans.

Nzame, Mebere, and Nkwa then re-created earth and made a new human, Sekume. Unlike, Fam, Sekume can die. He became the ancestor of the Fang people after he created his wife, Mbongwe, from a tree.

== See also ==
- List of African mythological figures
