= J. P. Clark =

Nigerian poet and playwright (1935–2020)

- Born: John Pepper Clark-Bekederemo; 6 April 1935; Kiagbodo, Delta, Nigeria
- Died: 13 October 2020 (aged 85)
- Other name: John Pepper Clark
- Education: University of Ibadan
- Occupations: Poet, playwright
- Notable work: A Decade of Tongues
- Awards: Nigerian National Order of Merit Award

John Pepper Clark-Bekederemo (6 April 1935 – 13 October 2020) was a Nigerian poet and playwright. He popularly published as J. P. Clark and John Pepper Clark.

== Life ==
Born in Kiagbodo, Nigeria, to an Ijaw father and Urhobo mother, Clark was a direct descendant of the powerful chief and trader Bekederemo of Kiagbodo. He received his early education at the Native Authority School, Okrika (Ofinibenya-Ama), in Burutu LGA (then Western Ijaw) and at the prestigious Government College in Ughelli. He had his BA degree in English language, at the University of Ibadan, where he edited various magazines, including the Beacon and The Horn. Upon graduation in 1960, he worked as an information officer in the Ministry of Information, in the old Western Region of Nigeria, as features editor of the Daily Express, and as a research fellow at the Institute of African Studies, University of Ibadan. He served for several years as a professor of English at the University of Lagos, a position from which he retired in 1980. While at the University of Lagos he was co-editor of the literary magazine Black Orpheus.

In 1982, along with his wife Ebun Odutola (a professor and former director of the Centre for Cultural Studies at the University of Lagos), he founded the PEC Repertory Theatre in Lagos.

A widely travelled man, Clark held visiting professorial appointments at several institutions of higher learning, including Yale and Wesleyan University in the United States.

The Ijaw leader Chief Edwin Kiagbodo Clark was his brother.

== Poetry ==
Clark was most noted for his poetry, including:

- Poems (Mbari, 1961), a group of 40 lyrics that address heterogeneous themes;
- A Reed in the Tide (Longmans, 1965), occasional poems that focus on the Clark's indigenous African background and his travel experience in America and other places;
- Casualties: Poems 1966–68 (USA: Africana Publishing Corporation, 1970), which illustrate the horrendous events of the Nigeria-Biafra war;
- A Decade of Tongues (Longmans, Drumbeat series, 1981), a collection of 74 poems, all of which apart from "Epilogue to Casualties" (dedicated to Michael Echeruo) were previously published in earlier volumes;
- State of the Union (1981), which highlights Clark's apprehension concerning the sociopolitical events in Nigeria as a developing nation;
- Mandela and Other Poems (1988), which deals with the perennial problem of aging and death.

Critics have noted three main stages in Clark's poetic career: the apprenticeship stage of trial and experimentation, exemplified by such juvenilia as "Darkness and Light" and "Iddo Bridge"; the imitative stage, in which he appropriates such Western poetic conventions as the couplet measure and the sonnet sequence, exemplified in such lyrics as "To a Fallen Soldier" and "Of Faith"; and the individualized stage, in which he attains the maturity and originality of form of such poems as "Night Rain", "Out of the Tower", and "Song".

Throughout his work, certain themes reoccur:

- Violence and protest, in Casualties;
- Institutional corruption, in State of the Union;
- The beauty of nature and the landscape, as in A Reed in the Tide;
- European colonialism, "Ivbie" in the Poems collection;
- The inhumanity of the human race, in Mandela and Other Poems.

Clark frequently dealt with these themes through a complex interweaving of indigenous African imagery and that of the Western literary tradition.

== Drama ==
Clark's dramatic work includes Song of a Goat – premiered at the Mbari Club in 1961 – a tragedy cast in the Greek classical mode in which the impotence of Zifa, the protagonist, causes his wife Ebiere and his brother Tonye to indulge in an illicit love relationship that results in suicide. This play was followed by a sequel, The Masquerade (1964), in which Dibiri's rage culminates in the death of his suitor Tufa. Other works include:

- The Raft (1964), in which four men drift helplessly down the Niger aboard a log raft.
- Ozidi (1966), a transcription of a performance of an epic drama of the Ijaw people.
- The Boat (1981), a prose drama that documents Ngbilebiri history.
- The Wives' Revolt (1991), the story of a Niger Delta community that received a payout from an oil firm drilling in its land; how the money is to be shared – between elders, men and women – eventually stokes the flame of revolution in the town.

Although his plays have been criticized for leaning too much on the Greek classical mode (especially the early ones), for their thinness of structure and for unrealistic stage devices (such as the disintegration of the raft on the stage in The Raft), his defenders argue that they challenge and engage the audience with their poetic quality and their uniting of the foreign and the local through graphic imagery.

== Other works ==
Clark's contribution to other genres includes his translation of the Ozidi Saga (1977), an oral literary epic of the Ijaw that in its local setting would normally take seven days to perform, his critical study The Example of Shakespeare (Evanston: Northwestern University Press, 1970), in which he articulates his aesthetic views about poetry and drama and his journalistic essays in the Daily Express, Daily Times, and other newspapers. He is also the author of the controversial America, Their America (Deutsch, 1964; Heinemann African Writers Series No. 50, 1969), a travelogue in which he criticizes American society and its values. While the furore generated by this book arguably catapulted him into the international literary limelight, the damage it and Casualties did to his reputation seems permanent; in both works he infuriated and alienated a large audience and some influential critics. In his defence, Clark maintained that he merely portrayed events as he saw them.

== Honours and recognition ==
As one of Africa's pre-eminent and distinguished authors, he continued to play an active role in literary affairs, a role for which he increasingly gained international recognition. In 1991, for example, he received the Nigerian National Order of Merit Award for literary excellence and saw publication, by Howard University, of his two definitive volumes, The Ozidi Saga and Collected Plays and Poems 1958–1988.

On 6 December 2011, to honour the life and career of Professor John Pepper Clark-Bekederemo, a celebration was held at Lagos Motor Boat Club, Awolowo Road, Ikoyi, for the publication of J. P. Clark: A Voyage, The definitive biography of the main animating force of African poetry, written by playwright Femi Osofisan. The launch was attended by "what could be described as the who is who in the literary community", including Nobel laureate Wole Soyinka. In 2015 the Society of Young Nigerian Writers under the leadership of Wole Adedoyin founded the JP Clark Literary Society, aimed at promoting and reading Clark's works.

== Death ==
Clark died on 13 October 2020.

== See also ==
- Edwin Kiagbodo Clark
