= Huveane =

God in Pedi and Venda mythologies

Huveane, also known as Huve or Huwe, is a trickster god and creator god in Pedi and Venda mythologies. In some versions of the myths, Huveane is also depicted as the first human on earth.

== Legend ==
=== As creator god ===
In one myth associated with his portrayal as a creator god, Huveane was described to have created an infant from clay. He hid his baby from everyone else in his village, including his parents. and hid the baby in a hollow tree. His parents eventually found out, though they did not have an issue with it, and let Huveane continue raising the infant. However, the villagers did not share the same sentiment. They believed that Huveane created the baby with magic, leading them to fear that Huveane may use his powers against them. The villagers tried to kill him but never succeeded since Huveane had the power of foresight and was able to evade all their attempts.

In another myth, involving the discovery of sexual intercourse, Huveane was said to have fled earth due to the cacophony that arises from the discovery. Huveane escaped to the skies, which symbolized heaven, by creating steps to walk upon. He also removed the steps as he climbed upward, ensuring that humans cannot follow him.

=== As trickster god ===
Huveane's reputation as a trickster god may have arisen from several myths where he played pranks on his family and the people of his village. In one myth, he stole his father's food and left cow manure instead on the empty plates. When his father asked what happened to the food, he pretended that the food had been changed into cow manure by some unknown magic.

== See also ==
- List of African mythological figures
