= Ajok =

Supreme deity in Lotuko mythology

Ajok, also known as Adyok and Naijok in certain variations, is the supreme deity in Lotuko mythology, who created humans as a mirror image of himself.

== Legend ==
Ajok is known as a benevolent god to humankind according to Lotuko mythology, as long as they continue to worship him through prayers and sacrificial offerings.

=== Origin of Death ===
Ajok plays a central role in the Lotuko myth of how death became a permanent state for living beings. It is said that the child of the first woman and the man of humans had died, and the first woman asked for Ajok’s help to revive the child. Ajok did so, but the husband of the woman found out about it. The woman did not consult her husband about her intentions beforehand, and he became angered by what happened. The revived child was later killed by the husband as retaliation for her wife’s actions. In one version of the myth, his wife was also killed at his hands. Ajok originally planned to make humans immortal, but after what transpired, he left Earth and declared that from that day on, those who died shall remain that way.

=== The Rainmaker ===
Ajok is also associated with the Lotuko myth of the rainmaker. The rainmaker is a being named Ibon and the personification of this role is bestowed to the leader of the Lotuko community. According to the myth, when the rain pours from the sky, the spirits of the dead are entreating Ajok on behalf of the living to make it happen.

== See also ==
- List of African mythological figures
