= Kamappa =

Khanyapa
Creature information
- Other name(s): Kholumolumo
- Grouping: Monster
- Similar entities: Khodumodumo
- Folklore: Myth

Origin
- Country: South Africa, Lesotho

Khanyapa (also known as Kholumolumo in Lesotho Sesotho and Kgodumodumo in South African Sesotho) is a mythical creature from the Basotho people of Southern Africa. It is described as a shapeless, gluttonous monster that swallows everything living it comes by and gets larger and larger the more it swallows. It has multiple sharp tongues which it uses as weapons. Khanyapa is the main antagonist in the story of Ditaolane where the monster is symbolic of all that holds back humanity and is killed by the hero.

== Etymology and origins ==
Khanyapa is possibly a synonym and descendant of Kgodumodumo. Kgodumodumo is an archaic Sotho term, most likely meaning “great noise”. Archeologists believe Khanyapa is influenced by the San people's python god. There are parallels, common themes and motifs, that in this myth and other stories from throughout Sub-Saharan Africa.

== Ditaolane ==
Once Khanyapa went about swallowing every living thing in its path, man and beast alike, lumbering through towns and villages and engulfing their inhabitants. Only one woman survived, as she had been hiding and the ashes masked her appearance and scent. Eventually the bloated Khanyapa dragged itself off and wedged its massive body in a mountain pass. All men perished. The Khanyapa, devoured them all, great and small. She was the last survivor of the human race. She prayed to the God and begged to not let this be the end of humanity. The Gods responded and she got pregnant.

The woman conceived, and brought forth a son in an old stable. She was surprised, on looking closely at the child, to find his neck adorned with a little necklace of divining charms. She therefore decided that his name would be Ditaolane, the Diviner. She took straw to make a bed for her child. When she went into the stable, she was shocked and terrified: the child had already become a fully grown man speaking wisely. He expressed surprise at the solitude around him. He asked his mother if they were the only ones on the earth. She told him how, until a short time before, the valleys and mountains were covered with humans, but the beast whose voice makes the rocks tremble had devoured them all. She pointed the beast out to her son. Despite his mother’s warnings, Ditaolane went to face Khanyapa alone.

Ditaolane took a knife and went to attack the devourer of the world. Khanyapa swallowed him, but he was not dead. Armed with his knife, he went into the stomach of the monster and tore his entrails. Khanyapa roared fiercely, then fell dead. When Ditaolane set about opening the beast to get out, the point of his knife made thousands of human beings cry out, beings who were buried alive with him. Finally, he made an opening through which the nations of the earth emerged. The people had been delivered from death and wondered about the identity of the man who had released them. They eventually grew suspicious of him and plotted to kill Ditaolane. However he escapes by turning himself into a stone.
