= Inkosazana =

Inkosazana is a member of the Zulu pantheon and one of the fertility goddesses, with the other being Nomkhubulwane. Some sources also conflated the two with one another.

== Representation ==
Inkosazana is a shapeshifter, although she often appears as a mermaid since she is said to dwell in the water. There have been records of her appearing in the shape of animals and even plants. She is also often referred to as the "heavenly princess".

Although both Nomkhubulwane and Inkosazana are fertility goddesses in the Zulu people's traditional religion, certain sources consider Inkosazana as specifically associated with agriculture and growth. Nomkhubulwane, in contrast, is associated with harvest. Though both deities are also said to have dominion over female affairs, sources that differentiate the two deities as separate entities portrayed them differently. Nomkhubulwane is said to have authority over motherhood, while Inkosazana is preoccupied with matters relating to female virgins.

Inkosazana often speaks to the divine healers or the isangoma of the Zulu people.

== Legends ==
=== Communicating with the Zulu people ===
It is said that Inkosazana dispenses many laws and requests to humankind, though she does not interact with the Zulu men directly. In one account, Inkosazana met a man, and she told him not to turn his back on her, saying that she was naked. The man dared not to look at her face-to-face since it is said that those who look at her directly will fall ill and die shortly after. When she does communicate with the Zulu, she often gave advice pertaining to agricultural and feminine matters.

== See also ==
- List of African mythological figures
- List of fertility deities
- Zulu traditional religion
