= Kwoth =

Supreme creation god of the Nuer people

Kuoth, also known as Kuoth Nhial, is the supreme omnipresent god and creator deity of the Nuer people of South Sudan and Gambella.

== Legend ==
Kwoth is known as the "Spirit of the Sky", and is thought to have reign over celestial bodies and natural phenomena. Kwoth created humans and let them live on earth. However, there remained a rope that linked heaven and earth. This allowed humans to climb up to heaven when they became old, and upon their arrival in heaven, humans would return to their rejuvenated selves. One day, a hyena used the rope to travel to heaven. In some versions, the hyena is accompanied by a weaver bird. Kwoth was wary of their intentions and tried to stop them from returning to earth. They escaped, however, and the hyena later cut the rope connecting the two realms. From that day on, humans can die of old age.

== Worship practice ==
Since Kwoth is omnipresent, the people of Nuer worships Kwoth's manifestations through sacrifice and prayers. Although minor deities exist in the Nuer pantheons, such as Kuth Nhial and Kuth Piny, these deities are considered as manifestations of Kwoth. One form of sacrificial offering done in the name of Kwoth occurs after the death of a Nuer person. An ox is slaughtered in honor of Kwoth, and its spirit is supposed to accompany the spirit of the deceased as they travel to heaven. Meat of the slaugthered animals is eaten after the ritual, as the animals body is not connected to the ritual.

== See also ==
- List of African mythological figures
