= America, Their America =

1964 travelogue by J. P. Clark

- Author: J. P. Clark
- Language: English
- Genre: Memoir
- Publication date: 1964

America, Their America (1964) is a personal journal and travelogue by Nigerian writer J. P. Clark. It was written after Clark spent eight months in the United States studying at Princeton University (on a fellowship from which he was terminated). The book has been noted for its fusion of autobiography and travelogue into what one critic called an "autotravography" in the mould of books written by European and English visitors to the United States, such as Dickens's American Notes.

Today the book is sometimes taught in college courses about West African literature and is cited in discussions about African perspectives on the United States. The book was also republished in 1968 as part of the influential Heinemann African Writers Series.
