= Khonvoum =

Bambuti Pygmy supreme god and creator

Khonvoum is the supreme god and creator in the mythology of the Bambuti Pygmy people of central Africa. He is the "great hunter", god of the hunt, and carries a bow made of two snakes which appears to mortals as a rainbow. He rules the heavens and when the sun sets, he gathers pieces of the stars and throws it at the sun so that it may rise the next day in its full splendor. He contacts people by means of the mythical elephant Gor (the thunderer) or through a chameleon. Khonvoum created black and white people from black and white clay and the Pygmies from red clay. For them, he also created the jungle with its lush vegetation and animal life.

== See also ==
- Bambuti mythology
