= Ditaolane =

Ditaolane, also known as Moshanyana-wa-Senkatana or Senkatana (spelled as Litaolane and Moshanyana oa Senkatana in Lesotho Sesotho) is a hero and deity in the Basotho religion and mythology. Moshanyana-wa-Senkatana means "Senkatana's little boy" and Ditaolane comes from the Sotho-Tswana word for divination bones, ditaola, which he was born with in the legends

== Legend ==
Before Ditaolane was born, nearly all humans had been eaten by a monster called Kammapa. The only remaining human left was Ditaolane’s mother, who hid herself in a stable. When Ditaolane was born, he came out of her mother’s womb wearing a necklace of divination bones, or ditaola. His mother named him Ditaolane, meaning the diviner, in honor of this. The baby then grew into an adult human almost instantaneously.

When Ditaolane saw the state of the world for the first time and the cause of it, he left his dwelling with a knife in hand to seek Kammapa and defeat him. In his encounter with Kammapa, Ditaolane was swallowed whole, though he remained uninjured. He escaped from Kammapa’s body by slashing his body from the inside, which fatally injured Kammapa. The people who had been eaten by Kammapa, were alive inside his belly all this time and escaped with Ditaolane.

Unfortunately, the people that Ditaolane rescued grew to fear him, thinking that he is also a monstrous being since he was able to kill Kammapa. They tried to kill him in numerous ways, from trying to bury him alive, to sending an army to ambush him. In one version of the myth, Ditaolane left after he turned into a stone, and was thrown away by one of the warriors sent to kill him. In another version, Ditaolane gave up and let himself be killed, only for his heart to turn into a bird and flew out of his corpse.

== See also ==
- List of African mythological figures
