= Woyengi =

Mythological figure in Ijaw culture

Woyengi is the creator goddess of the Ijo people of Nigeria. She is also known as the goddess of fate in certain depictions.

In Ijaw culture, Woyengi went through many variations. Small details, but they are very consistent with her story.

== Religious Representation ==
=== Ijo Culture ===
According to the Ijo myth, Woyengi descended from the heavens to earth, with thunder and lightning heralding her arrival. Woyengi did not create plants and animals on earth since they had already existed before she made her appearance, however, she is responsible for creating humans. In the myth of Ogboinba, Woyengi was about to return to the heavens after she had finished her creation process when Ogboinba found her.

=== Ijaw Culture ===
The Ijaw people have many variations to Woyengi's creation story, with each detail varying in small details. But, they're all consistent in the concept of a maternal creator permitting the free will of their creations. As people living along the Niger delta, the story of Woyengi as a creator falls in line with the traditional human characterization of spirits and gods in Ijaw religion. Above and beyond their sheer dominance and power as gods, Ijaw deities often took on human quantities, both strengths and limitations. Woyengi's emotional response to Ogboinba's request is just one example of such personification.

== Narrative ==
=== Creation of life ===
Before Woyengi made her appearance on earth, several objects emerged: an iroko tree, a large table, a chair, and a creation stone. Then, she sat on the chair and put her feet on the creation stone, and from there, she started making humans from the earth's soil. Originally, these humans were created without genders. Woyengi let the first humans she created choose whether they would rather be a man or a woman. These humans were also told to determine the kind of life they would like to live on earth as well as decide their manner of death. In certain interpretations of the myth, each decision that the humans make will lead them to a different river mouth and a new location to live in. This series of events is the reason why Woyengi is also known as a fate goddess.

=== Role in Ogboinba's myth ===
In Ogboinba's myth, which recounted the story of a woman, Ogboinba, who wished to change her gifts from magical powers to childbearing, Woyengi played the role of a wrathful goddess. Ogboinba, who went on a journey to meet Woyengi so she could fulfill Ogboinba's wish, had her request summarily rejected by Woyengi. However, Ogboinba was adamant and challenged Woyengi to a magical battle. Woyengi was enraged by Ogboinba's audacity and took away her powers instead. To escape Woyengi's rage, Ogboinba fled into the eyes of a pregnant woman, where she is said to remain until now.

== Woyengi's Creations ==
Woyengi created two women, believed by some to be her daughters. The first daughter gave birth to many children, while the second daughter, chose to wield magic over the world. Both daughters grew up as sisters, after being married, both fulfilled the destiny set for them. The first woman is unknown, the second daughter was known as Ogboinba. Ogboinba was disheartened by her choice since she couldn't enjoy the love of a child, unlike her sister.
