= Arebati =

African god

Arebati is known as the god of creation or supreme god in the mythology of the Efé people of the Democratic Republic of the Congo. The deity is also worshipped by the Mbuti people, but under a different name, which is Baatsi. In other African Pygmies' mythologies, Arebati and Tore are synonymous to one another, while in others, Tore is a forest god while Arebati is a lunar god.

== Legend ==
=== In Efé mythology ===
According to Efé myths, Arebati created the world and the first man from clay with the help of the Moon. At first, humans were immortal. Whenever a person grows elderly, Arebati returns them to their younger selves. One day, a woman passed away under Arebati's watch. He planned to resurrect her and asked a frog for help. He needed the frog to move the woman's corpse to the side of the road. However, a toad appeared and requested that he do the task instead of the frog.

To see whether the toad would be capable of doing so, Arebati asked the toad to sit on the edge of the pit with the woman's corpse. Arebati warned the toad that if the toad and the woman's corpse fell into the pit, a great misfortune shall befall them. In one version, the toad's anger over this challenge led both him and the woman's corpse to fall into the pit, while in another version, his clumsiness is to be blamed. Nevertheless, the toad and the woman's corpse ended in the pit, and the woman was unable to be revived by Arebati. Because of this event, the rest of humanity is fated with the same experience, which is to die permanently and be buried in a grave.

== See also ==
- List of African mythological figures
