= Ozidi =

Ozidi is a folk hero among the Ijo of Nigeria, and the subject of The Ozidi Saga.

== A Series Of Excerpts From The Oral Records Of The Ijo People ==
After his father is murdered by treacherous colleagues, Ozidi seeks vengeance so his father can join his ancestors. His goal is to call home his father from a limbo-like evil grove where the murdered go instead of joining their ancestors.

Ozidi vomits his sword and battle outfit out of himself before each battle. He leads his musician-assistants, his grandmother, and the animals and objects that he regurgitates. His grandmother coaches him to many victories, but Ozidi goes too far and kills his uncle and an innocent woman and her newborn son. The Smallpox King comes to take Ozidi in punishment, but Ozidi's mother insists that her son was only being afflicted by Yaws, a mild childhood disease that Ozidi had never contracted. Somehow the Smallpox King was confused and he retreated. Upon recovery, Ozidi gave up his battle sword for good.
