= Gaunab =

Gaunab is the personification of death in Khoekhoen mythology. In some myths, he is also known as the embodiment of evil. He is often associated with Tsui’goab, and in some versions, is known to be his nemesis.

== Legend ==
In Khoekhoe mythology, Gaunab is said to be the Spirit of Death. In one myth, Gaunab visited a village that had experienced a drought with the intention of taking dying villagers to the underworld. He was in disguise, and was visiting one of the village's elders who is on his deathbed. One of the villagers, Tsui’goab, recognized him and challenged Gaunab to a wrestling match. If Tsui’goab won, Gaunab must stop the drought. If Gaunab won instead, he could claim the lives of all the villages, both living and dead, including Tsui’goab himself. Gaunab eventually agreed to the challenge, and they both wrestled with one another for days. Eventually, Tsui’goab won the challenge to Gaunab's consternation. He was enraged at the result and ended up breaking Tsui’goab’s knees at the end of the fight. Nevertheless, Gaunab honored the deal though he was unable to directly stop the drought since it was not under his domain. Instead, he asked the other gods to make Tsui’goab a rain god instead. After Tsui’goab recovered from the injury he received from Gaunab, he discovered his newfound powers and was able to call upon rain to fall on his village.

== See also ==
- List of African mythological figures
