= Kuino =

A kuino, in the african folklore (Guinea), is an evil spirit who has his heart placed in a material item, called sambio. The sambio can be destroyed by a wizard, and this results in the death of the spirit.
