= Kwase Benefo =

Kwase Benefo, or Kwasi Benefo, is a mythic hero featured in the mythology of Ashanti people in Ghana. He is well known for his encounter with Amokye, the Ashanti psychopomp, during his journey to the underworld (asamando) to be reunited with his wives.

== Representation ==
Kwase Benefo is depicted as a man who owns a fertile land. He became a farmer and rancher, and was successful in his endeavors. Prior to the tragedy which led him to travel to the underworld, Kwase Benefo was unmarried and lived alone.

== Role in myths ==
=== Journey to the underworld ===
Kwase Benefo had a relatively prosperous life as a farmer and a rancher, and was missing only a few things, which he greatly wanted: a wife and children. So, he set out to a nearby village to find himself a woman to marry. His efforts paid off, and he returned to his home with a beautiful woman, which he later married. His wife became sick and died soon after. Kwase Benefo grieved for her deeply; to the point that he began hallucinating that she was still alive, which led his family and friends to intervene. They encouraged him to find another wife, and Kwase Benefo went back to the village to do so.

Kwase Benefo then returned to his home with his new wife, and not long after, she became pregnant and was due to give birth to a son. Before she could do so, she was struck ill, and died before she was able to bring their son to the world. Kwase Benefo was once again bereaved with what happened, and this time, he isolated himself from the outside world. The family of his second wife heard what happened and offered their second daughter for Kwase to marry.

Eventually, Kwase Benefo accepted their offer, and married his wife's sister, who became his third wife. Just like the second wife, the woman became pregnant with a son, but this time, she managed to give birth to him and survived to raise him with Kwase Benefo. This was not to last, however, since his third wife died. She was killed when a tree fell on her.

Kwase Benefo was so filled with sorrow and became very unresponsive that the people around him thought he was also dead. Eventually, spiritual healers were summoned to help Kwase Benefo to return to normal. Yet, this incident led many others to think that Kwase Benefo was somehow cursed, since all of the women who married him died. Kwase Benefo started to believe this as well. He abandoned his work and left his son in the care of his deceased wife's family, and later, left the farm he lived in as well.

He wandered without any set destination, looking for a place that would put him as far away from other people. In the end, however, he settled close to a village where no one knows him. Once again, he married a woman from the village, taking her as his fourth wife. And just like the other women who had married him, she soon fell ill and died.

Kwase Benefo left once more, and this time he returned to his old village. Unlike how it was when he left, the villagers’ sentiments toward him have changed, and they rejoiced at his re-appearance. Kwase Benefo, however, was still weighed down by all the losses he had experienced, and one night, decided to find the underworld.

He started his journey by going to the village's burial grounds. After walking for a while, and experiencing many strange encounters, he stopped nearby a river. He tried to cross it, but the current was too strong. Suddenly, he saw an old woman on the other side of the river. This old woman is Amokye and Kwase Benefo knows this. He told Amokye that he wanted to die so that he could meet his wives again, but Amokye allowed him to do so without having to give up his soul. She does warn him that he will be unable to see them, but Kwase Benefo insisted nonetheless. Amokye granted him passage to her side of the river, where his deceased wives welcomed him. They also urged Kwase Benefo to marry once again—which he ultimately did, and this time, his fifth wife lived on.

== See also ==
- Nyame
- List of African mythological figures
- Akan mythology
