= Neiterkob =

Neiterkob (also Neiterkǒb or Neiterǔkŏb) is a figure from the mythology of the Maa-speaking communities, most notably the Maasai in the present day. He is perceived as having a superior intelligence and as having the ability to intercede with Engai or Enkai (supreme being in Maa mythology) on behalf of man.

== Etymology ==
Neiterkob means "that which began the earth". It may also be a reference to Enkai.

== Overview ==
The earliest written account of Neiterkob comes from Krapf's account of the Kwavi people, a Maa-speaking community that disintegrated under Maasai attack in the 1850s.

At the remotest antiquity there was one man resident on Oldoinio eibor (white mountain) who was superior to any human being, and whom the Engai (heaven, supreme being, god) had placed on the mountain. This strange personage, whose beginning and end is quite mysterious and whose whole appearance impresses the Wakuafi mind with the idea of a demi-god, is called Neiterkǒb (or Neiterǔkŏb)...

— Ludwig Krapf, 1854

Krapf states further on that "regarding Oldoinio eibor it is necessary to remark that by this term is meant the Kirénia or Endurkenia, or simply Kenia, as the Wakamba call it..."

== Intercession on behalf of Enjemasi ==
According to Krapf's account, "the intelligence of (Neiterkob) reached a man named Enjémǎsi Enauner, who with his wife Sambu lived on mount Sambu which is situated to the Southwest of Oldoinio eibor". No account is given on how the intelligence of Neiterkob reached Enjémǎsi however he is said to have gone to Oldoinio where he got fruitful and gave birth to many children through the intercession of Neiterkob.

Neiterkob is also said to have taught Enjémǎsi Enauner the taming of wild cows which he saw in the forest which led to the adoption of pastoral life and habit by the ancestors of the Kwavi. Krapf noted that "the Wakuafi up to the present day consider the white mountain their primitive home and head-quarter in consequence of Enjemasi having met there with Neiterkob, who by his intercession with the Engai procured for him children and cattle..."

== Disappearance ==
Krapf's narratives note that following his gift to Enjémǎsi, Neiterkob "at once disappeared on Oldoinio eibor..."
