= Ekombi =

Traditional dance of the Efik people

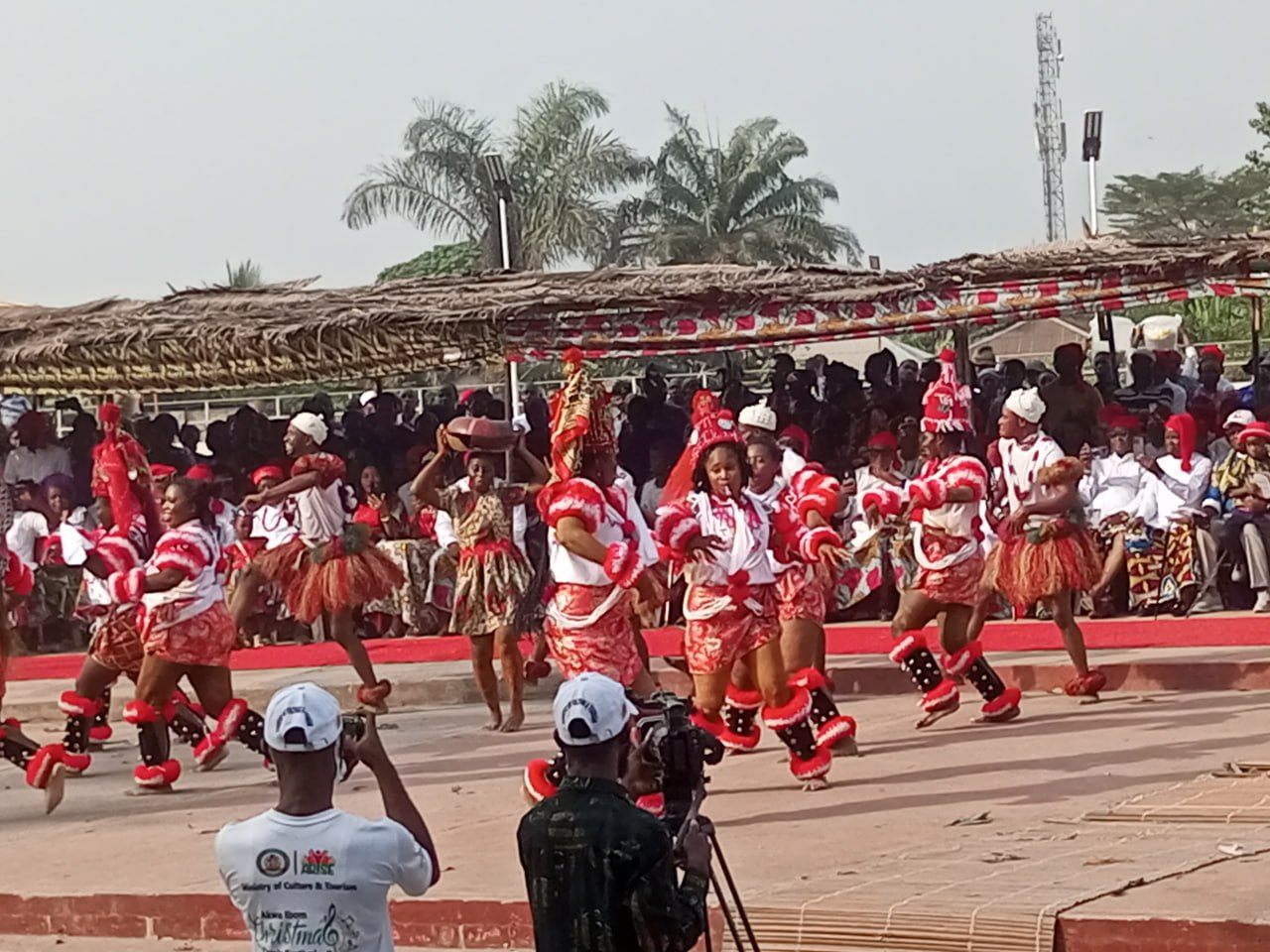
Ekombi dancers of Akwa Ibom State

The Ekombi dance is a well-known dance of the Efik, from Cross River State, Nigeria. Ekombi is more than just movements. It tells a story of the Efik and their life by the sea.

The dance steps mimics the ocean's waves. They also mirror the motions of tides. The Efik and Ibibio are a coastal group, so the sea is important to them. Fishing is their main job. Their lives depend on the ocean’s rhythms. Ekombi captures this relationship through graceful movements. Dancers flow like water. They create shapes that remind people of the sea. This links their culture to the natural world.
