= Uhlakanyana =

Figure featured in Xhosa and Zulu mythologies

Uhlakanyana, also known as Hlakayana, is a trickster figure featured in Zulu mythologies.

== Representation ==
In Xhosa mythology, Uhlakanyana is depicted as a child who was born with supernatural powers, including being able to shapeshift into different forms, and often appeared as both male and female. However, in Zulu mythology, Uhlakanyana is portrayed as a dwarf-like figure in the same category as Tikdoshe. Uhlakanyana also tends to take actions based on their malevolent urges. This interpretation differs slightly in Xhosa mythology, where Uhlakanyana’s intentions are described as neutral rather than intentionally malicious, though they are capable of great cruelty.

== Legends ==
According to some myths, Uhlakanyana was the child of a village chief’s wife, who was the last woman in her village to bear a child. Uhlakanyana spoke to their mother before they were born, asking her to give birth to them. Since they were an infant, Uhlakanyana had done many schemes against the villagers, such as pretending that dogs had eaten the meat that the village men had hunted, which led them to beat their wives and children—when in reality, Uhlakanyana had stolen the meat.

Many of Uhlakanyana’s exploits involved tricking other characters for food. In one story, their actions led to the death of an old woman, who ended up boiling herself alive. Unknowingly, her children who visited her house ended up eating the grandmother’s corpse. There had been stories where Uhlakanyana was killed by the people they tricked, but the figure seemed to return to life in several of them.

== See also ==
- List of African mythological figures
