= Katonda (mythology) =

Supreme creator god in the Buganda mythology

Katonda is the name used to refer to the supreme creator god in the traditional religion of the Baganda people, who are mostly based in present-day Uganda. Katonda is considered as the father and leader of the Baganda pantheon, known collectively as the balubaale (sing. lubaale).

== Representation ==
Like many African supreme gods, Katonda is conceived as a distant god that dwells in the skies—which represented the heavens—and does not directly influence the material world. Instead, his presence is felt through the actions of the balubaale. Despite his lack of involvement in worldly affairs, Katonda is present in the afterlife and presided over the judgement of humans.

As a creator god, Katonda also created the first human; the man, Kintu. He is also said to have created Bukulu, a god whose offsprings represent the majority of the balubaale.

According to Apollo Kaggwa (1934), Katonda seems to have less of an influence in Baganda worship traditions compared to the balubaale, finding only a few temples in Kyagwe dedicated to Katonda. His accounts instead considered Mukasa to be the leader of the balubaale.

== Alternative names ==
According to Arthur Cotterell (1997), there are several names that are used in reference to Katonda:

1. Lissoddene (the big eye in the sky)
2. Kagingo (master of life)
3. Ssewannaku (the eternal)
4. Lugaba (giver)
5. Ssebintu (master of all things)
6. Nnyiniggulu (lord of heaven)
7. Namuginga (he who shapes)
8. Ssewaunaku (the compassionate)
9. Gguluddene (the gigantic one)
10. Namugereka (he who apportions)

== See also ==
- Religion in Uganda
