= Kibuka (deity) =

God in the traditional Baganda religion

Kibuka, also known as Kibuuka, is a member of the balubaale or pantheon of gods in the religion of the Baganda people, who resides in present-day Uganda. He is thought to be a war god.

== Representation ==
Kibuuka often provides advice to Baganda kings during times of war, diseases, as well as other catastrophic events like mass deaths . According to some sources, Kibuka, just like his older brother Mukasa, used to be mortal but ascended to godhood.

== Family ==
Kibuuka is the younger brother of Mukasa, the god of lakes and oceans, prosperity, fertility, and harvest. They are both the sons of Wanema, and the grandsons of Musisi, who is depicted as the embodiment of the earthquake.

== Myths ==
=== Death of Kibuka ===
According to one myth, Kibuuka was sent by his father, Wanema, to assist one of the Baganda kings, Nakibinge, who was in the middle of a war with the people of Bunyoro. Kibuuka helped devised the plan to defeat them, and his role was to strike the Bunyoro soldiers from the clouds. Victory was imminent for the Baganda army. One day, the army brought captives into their camps – even though Wanema and Kibuuka had warned them to not do so. One of these captives was a woman who later made her escape and reported what she had seen in the camp to the Bunyoro army, including Kibuuka's position during an attack. The following day, the Bunyoro army engaged in another battle with the Baganda army, and with the knowledge of Kibuuka's location, one of the archers let loose an arrow which fatally wounded Kibuka in the chest.

There are several versions as to what happened next. In one version, Kibuuka set himself down on a tree in Mbale Hill, Mpigi and died there, becoming a god. In another version, his shield was taken by the Bunyoro army and they ended up getting cursed with an epidemic of diseases. Hence, the army returned the shield to King Nakibinge, who buried Kibuuka's body and belongings and erected a temple in his honor, and since then he became the god of war. In one other version, Kibuuka's body was never found.
