= Ogboinba =

Mythological figure in Ijaw culture

Ogboinba is a mythical sorceress who appears in the folklore of the Ijo (Ijaw) people of Nigeria. She is noted for attempting to use her supernatural powers to challenge Woyengi, the supreme deity of the Ijo, into changing her chosen fate of childlessness. While escaping Woyengi's anger, she enters the eyes of a pregnant woman, and remains trapped there. The Ijo say that when you look into the eyes of another person, it is Ogboinba who looks back at you.

== In literature ==
The story of Ogboinba has been adapted and discussed by several Nigerian writers. In the play Woyengi by Obotunde Ijimere (a pseudonym for Ulli Beier), Ogboinba appears as the antagonist, coming into conflict with powerful spirits in her quest to change her fate. Isidore Okpewho expands on the traditional motifs of the myth in his book Myth in Africa. Titus-Green notes that the myth of Ogboinba hiding in the eyes of every person, represents the potential for greed and inordinate ambition that exists in each person.
