= Libanza =

Libanza is a legendary figure in Boloki and Upoto mythologies. In Boloki mythology, Libanza is a heroic character who is depicted as the first man, while in Upoto mythology, Libanza is a supreme god worshipped for creating the universe.

== In Boloki mythology ==
Libanza was born from a mother figure who gave birth to all animals of the earth. Before his birth, Libanza's shield, spears, and chair left his mother's womb first. Libanza's father was already killed by this time by an unknown figure when he was stealing fruits for his wife. Libanza eventually found out about this and went on a journey to pursue his father's murderer with his sister, Nsongo. He later succeeded in avenging his father's death by killing his murderer. Libanza also had shape-shifting abilities, which he later used in his other adventures.

== In Upoto mythology ==
As the creator god in Upoto mythology, Libanza is also associated with an origin-of-death myth involving two groups of people: the people of the earth and the people of the moon. It is said that when Libanza called upon these two groups, the people of the moon were the first to heed his call. As a reward for their obedience, Libanza gave the people of the moon eternal life, with one caveat, which was that they would die for two days every month. The people of the earth, who arrived later than Libanza's expectations, were punished with a fate of having to eventually die and can never be resurrected to life.

== See also ==
- List of African mythological figures
