= Alex Konadu =

Ghanaian highlife musician (1948 – 2011)

- Also known as: One Man Thousand
- Origin: Ashanti Region, Ghana
- Genres: Highlife

Alex Konadu (1948 – 18 January 2011) was a Ghanaian singer-songwriter and guitarist who was known for his contribution to the Highlife tradition. Konadu sang in the Asante language Twi. He was nicknamed "One Man Thousand" for his ability to draw crowds wherever he appeared, and it is rumored that he performed in every single town and village in Ghana. Konadu's song "Asaase Asa," from the 1976 album by the same name, details a tragedy that befalls a man, killing his wife and sister. The song is dedicated to all those that have lost loved ones, and consequently, it is a "must-play at any Ghanaian funeral".

== Biography ==
Konadu was born in Adwumakase Kese in the Kwabere No. 3 District of Ashanti in 1948. He was part of the Kantamanto Bosco Group, the Kwabena Akwaboah and then the Happy Brothers Band before he became a solo artist. After watching him rehearse, record producer A. K. Brobbey signed him and organized a band that focused on uptempo Highlife guitar music.

Konadu died in Kumasi on 18 January 2011 at the age of 63.

== Discography ==
Albums

1977	Abokyi: Released: 1977; Label: BHM (Brobisco House of Music)
1977	Awoo Ne Awo: Released: 1977; Label: BHM (Brobisco House of Music)
1980	Nkrabea: Released: 1980; Label: BHM (Brobisco House of Music)
1988	One Man Thousand Live in London: Released: 1988; Label: World Circuit
1998	The Greatest Classics: Released: 1998; Label: Sam Records
1999	The Best Of Alex Konadu (One Man Thousand) Vol. 1: Released: 1999; Label: System 77 Productions
Unknown	God's Time is the Best: Label: BHM (Brobisco House of Music)
Unknown	The Best of Alex Konadu Vol. 2: Label: System 77 Productions

Contributing artist

- The Rough Guide to Highlife (2003, World Music Network)
