= Inyang Henshaw =

Nigerian musician

Chief Inyang Nta Henshaw (10 June 1927 - 19 December 1983) was a Nigerian highlife musician of the Efik Ekombi genre. Nicknamed the "Velvet voice" of Efik music, he is most popularly known for his band Inyang Henshaw and his Top Ten Aces.

== Early life and career ==
Inyang Nta Henshaw was born on June 10, 1927 in Henshaw Town (Nsidung), Calabar. He was the seventh son of Chief Thomas Henshaw from Henshaw Town and Madam Esemin Ita Eso Archibong from Old Town (Obutong). His father had close relationships with many important chiefs of Efik society and was a member of several traditional societies such as the Ekpri-Akata and Ekpe where he held the title of Obong Mkpe. His mother was a chorister and also a member of traditional societies such as Esop Nka Idorenyin and Esop Nka Okut Ama. Henshaw during his upbringing was greatly influenced by his parents' traditional values. Overhearing Discussions between his father and other chiefs, as well as experiencing traditional festivals and dances gave him knowledge on Efik proverbs and idioms. Many of his uncles whom he was close with were also titled-members of the Ekpe society, including his uncle Chief Eyo E. Archibong who later initiated him into the organization. His mothers strong attachment to the church and her background as a chorister also influenced his future involvement in church activities.

Between 1937 and 1946, he attended Henshaw Town Primary School and the Hope Waddell Training Institution. During his childhood, he developed an interest in singing in his home and in local Sunday school choirs. While attending school, he at times spent his holidays amongst palm oil planation workers, listening and participating while they recited folklores and fables. At age ten he joined the Henshaw Town Church choir. At age fifteen, he joined the well known Duke Town Church choir, distinguishing himself as a lead voice and in inter-choir singing competitions.

After leaving school, he travelled to Lagos to live with his parents while working for the Nigerian Railways and later Costains Limited. During this period, he was lead vocalist for the Calabar Choral Party. According to Henshaw, On the eve of Bobby Benson's return to Nigeria from London, Ekpo Ekpenyong, a sailor and friend of Henshaw recommended him to Benson. Another story says that during one concert at the Glover Hall, Benson happened to discover Henshaw while the Calabar Choral Party was performing. Benson afterwards sought out Henshaw and invited him into his "Bobby-Cassandra Group" as assistant director. From there the group staged many shows within Lagos before going on a country-wide tour of Nigeria and Ghana. In 1949 upon their return to Nigeria Henshaw resigned from his job and committed to a professional music career.

In 1950, Francis Bourdeaux, a friend of Benson's, requested a talented musician to help revive his band, the Eastern New Time Orchestra. Henshaw was selected from Benson's group and relocated to Enugu, becoming its leader as well as drummer and lead singer. During a subsequent nationwide tour, one local Kano businessman Abdul Wada was so impressed by the band's performances that he requested they stay as a resident band. Shortly thereafter, Mr. Walker, the proprietor of the Rendezvous Hotel in Kano offered them a long-term contract on the condition that Henshaw agreed to stay. The group ultimately stayed in Kano for about ten years.

In the early sixties upon Henshaw's return to Eastern Nigeria, he formed his own dance-band "The Top Ten Aces", including a complimentary vocal group "The Canaan Brothers" which had a long-term contract with the Nigerian Broadcasting Corporation. By the mid-sixties the band had become popular within Nigeria's emerging highlife scene. In the 1970s, the band followed up their success with a series of albums titled Efik Gold. Among them were several hit songs including Ma Ekanem, Sunsunly, Ebuk Idiok, Menso Kededi and Ebonjo Ekedidom. Henshaw's music style made extensive use of Efik culture and folklores in his music, creating a style that consumers generally preferred to listen rather than dance to.

Concurrently, in 1963 Philips Nigeria recruited Henshaw as a studio manager at their Lagos headquarters. He became in charge of their music talent division until 1976.

Some of his contemporaries include Emmanuel Ntia of the Eastern Stars Dance Band, Tex Ubong Henry, Sammy Obot of the Uhuru Dance Band, Peter Efiom and Burstic Kingsley Bassey and his "Anansas".. He also briefly played with Bayo Martins in the early fifties while apart of the Eastern New Time Orchestra.

In 1972, he became the founding president of the Esop Mkparawa, Lagos branch. In 1974 he was conferred with the title of "Ada-Idaha ke Iboku" by the Obong of Calabar Edidem Essien Ekpe Oku V. He also held the title of Obong Isemonko in Ekpe Efik Iboku and was an advisor in the Obong's council. Later on he became an instructor for the Department Theatre Arts at the University of Calabar.

He died on 19 December 1983 the at CREL hospital in Akamkpa.
