= Abassi (spirit) =

Nigerian god

Abassi (also known as Abasi or Awasi) is the supreme creator god of the Efik, Ibibio, and Annang people of Nigeria.

Following the arrival of Christian missionaries in Nigeria, Abassi was syncretized with the Christian concept of God and was referred to Abassi Ibom (in Ibibio and Efik myths) or Awasi Ibom (in Annang myths), although this interpretation is debated in present times. In certain versions of the myths, most notably ones originating from Annang folklore, the name Abassi is used in reference to other deities involved in the creation myth, which included Abassi Ibom.

== Representation ==
Abassi is depicted as an omnipresent and all-knowing deity, who is responsible for creating humans. However, Abassi does not directly interact with humans but communicates through a pantheon of spirits called ndem (in Efik and Ibibio myths) or nnem (in Annang myth). Abassi is also not directly worshipped, and thus shrines are not built in honor of Abassi, but the god's intermediaries instead, the ndem and the ancestor spirits, mbukpo (known as mme ete ete in Annang myths), with the latter helping its descendants to receive Abassi's favors.

In versions of the myth where Abassi refers to a group of deities, Abassi Isong, who dwells on earth, plays the role of the messenger by sending messages from humans to Abassi Anyong (also known as Abassi Onyong or Abassi Enyong), who dwell on the skies. Abassi Anyong is responsible for conveying the message to Abassi Ibom. According to certain interpretations, Abassi Anyong is depicted as male while Abassi Isong is depicted as female.

== Legends ==
=== Origin of death ===
According to Efik mythology, after Abassi created the first humans, a woman and a man, his wife, Atai, told him to allow them to live on earth. Abassi was wary of this and originally rejected the idea since he was afraid of the humans’ potential to surpass him. Nevertheless, despite his reservation, he acquiesced to his wife's request, although he gave two rules before he sent the first humans to earth. The first rule was that they were not allowed to grow their own food, and the second one was that they were not allowed to procreate. The humans agreed with these rules, and for a while, everything was alright. Then, the woman started to plant seeds and grow food for them, which her husband agreed was more delicious than the food that Abassi gave them. Not long after that, they also broke the second rule. Abassi was incensed at his wife since his fear has become reality: The humans had forsaken him and were now posing a threat to his rule. To appease her husband, Atai decided to send death into the world, ensuring that humans would not be able to threaten Abaasi's supremacy.

=== Creation of the universe ===
In Annang mythology, Abassi Ibom created the skies (Anyong), the earth (Isong), and the ocean (Inyang Ibom). Originally, the skies and the earth were joined in heaven and the ocean was below them. One day, Abassi Ibom told one of his creations, a shapeshifting giant, to separate the skies from the earth. The giant succeeded and Abasi Ibom told the skies to stay above while the earth was told to go down. As it fell down, the earth sunk to the ocean. The surviving parts of the earth that remained visible became the coast. The giant, satisfied with his success, took a bath in the ocean water. He drowned and died and his body parts became the impetus of living things on earth. As part of the myth, it is said that when the skies covered the earth, daytime had arisen, and when the earth covered the skies, night had fallen.

=== The distant god ===
In Ibibio mythology, Abassi was described to have lived in the skies, nearby humans, and can be communicated directly to. However, he was disturbed by the noise of an old woman making fufu with her pestle. After days of this, he became deeply annoyed and chose to move as far away from humans to avoid the noise. Thus, humans could no longer communicate with Abassi directly and had to go through the spirits and the ancestors.

== See also ==
- List of African mythological figures
