= Kimanaueze =

Kimanaueze, sometimes referred to as Na Kimanaueze or Na Kimanaueze Kia-Tumb’a Ndala, is a culture hero figure in Ambundu or Mbundu mythology whose people are mostly based in Angola at present. The name Kimanaueze can be used to refer to either the hero who married the daughter of the Sun and the Moon, as well as the father of said hero. The younger Kimanaueze is the father of another Ambundu culture hero, Sudika-mbambi, and his brother, Kabundungdulu.

== Representation ==
The older Kimanaueze is not prominently featured in Ambundu folktales. It is known, however, that he was killed by multi-headed monsters, makishi, when the younger Kimanaueze was away for business. Later on, Sudika-mbambi would slay Makishi to avenge his grandfather.

The younger Kimanaueze is depicted as ambitious, which is mostly attributed to his actions while trying to marry the daughter of the Sun and the Moon.

== Myths ==
Marriage with the Sun and the Moon's Daughter

The older Kimanaueze wanted the younger Kimanaueze to marry; he acquiesced to the request but stated that he will not marry a woman from earth—he intended to ask the hand of the daughter of the Sun and the Moon for marriage instead.

To do this, Kimanaueze had to figure out how to reach her in the first place. She was said to live with her parents in heavens, so Kimanaueze tried asking several animals to deliver his message to her. First, he asked the Antelope, who rejected his request, since he was unable to fly. Then, he asked the Hawk; and though he could fly, he was unable to soar high enough to reach where the daughter of the Sun and the Moon lived. Following that, he asked for the Vulture's help. The Vulture, unfortunately, can only fly halfway to where she is located.

Eventually Kimanaueze encountered the Frog, Mainu. He offered his assistance, assuring that he would be able to deliver Kimanaueze's proposal. At first, Kimanaueze found the idea ludicrous, but in the end, he let the Mainu try. Mainu was confident that he would be able to do the task since he knew of a well that is often visited by the Sun and Moon's royal attendants. Thus, when the time came, all the Mainu had to do was swallow the letter that Kimanaueze entrusted to him and jumped into a water jug that was carried by one of these attendants.

Auspiciously the water jug carried Mainu right into the room of the Sun King, whereupon he immediately left the letter at his desk. The Sun King was perplexed with the letter but put it off his mind—until the second time, when another letter arrived. When this happened, the Sun King sent off a reply, requesting Kimanaueze's presence in heaven with a dowry so that he can meet him in person and judge his worthiness.

Mainu relayed this to Kimanaueze who fulfilled the request by sending the dowries through Mainu since he cannot travel to heavens. At last, the day came when the Sun King told Kimanaueze that it was time for him to pick up his wife from the heavens. This proved to be yet another challenge for Kimanaueze, since he cannot travel to heaven. Once again, Mainu offered his assistance.

Mainu traveled back to heaven. This time, he did not bring anything, but he stole the eyes of the daughter of the Sun and the Moon and hid himself. The heavens were at an uproar when they found out what happened, and called the diviner Ngombo to figure out what had happened. Ngombo told them that she needed to be married off immediately or she would die. Thus, the Sun King sent off his daughter to earth with the help of the Spider. Mainu, who managed to return to earth as well, gave her eyes back and brought her to Kimanaueze, who later married her.

== See also ==
- Ambundu
- List of African mythological figures
- Sudika-mbambi
