= Unkulunkulu =

Zulu mythological figure

Unkulunkulu (/uɲɠulun'ɠulu/), often formatted as uNkulunkulu or uMkhulu Omkhulu, is a mythical ancestor, mythical predecessor group, or Supreme Creator in the language of the Zulu, Ndebele, and Swati people. Originally a "first ancestor" figure, Unkulunkulu morphed into a creator-god figure with the spread of Christianity.

== Pre-Christian role ==
Unkulunkulu was a general term referring to an "old-old one", or an ancestor. In this situation, these Onkulunkulu (the plural form) could be male or female, and most tribes and families had one, regarding them with great respect. Unkulunkulu also existed in a broader role as a sole, ancient figure; this figure being male, he played a role in broader as the ancestor of humanity, but was given little attention. Scholar Ana Maria Monteiro-Ferreira asserts that before the spread of Christianity to the Zulu people, Unkulunkulu was not a Supreme Being like that of the Christian God.

== Post-Christian role ==
With the spread of Christianity in the mid-1800s, various Zulu populations began referring to Unkulunkulu in a different light. This new form of Unkulunkulu was a creator deity rather than an ancestor archetype. This form closely resembles the Christian God and is referred to in the same context. M. R. Masubelele argues that American and European missionaries in the 1830s originally rejected the use of "Unkulunkulu" to the Christian God because of its association to ancestor worship, but eventually many European missionaries began using the name in order to better evangelize the Zulu people. Other names for this being used in similar cultures include uMdali (meaning "Creator") and uMvelinqandi (meaning "Before everything"; analogous to Umvelinqangi in the isiXhosa language).

While he still often represented the first man, he also began to represent a creator/originator of humanity and all creation. This version of Unkulunkulu originated from reeds; he then created humans and livestock from the same reeds, and created everything else afterwards from no original source. After he created all, Unkulunkulu is said to have forgotten his creations and abandoned them, and there are no myths of him beyond this point of creation. Historian William H. Worger argues that nineteenth-century indigenous Africans believed these creation myths and others pertaining to Unkulunkulu to be metaphorical rather than literal, as demonstrated through their debates with European missionaries about their similarities to the Bible and their "literal" truth.
