= Sudika-mbambi =

Figure from Ambundu mythology

Sudika-mbambi is a hero and son of Kimanaueze and is an Ambundu mythological figure. He is featured in several Ambundu legends and is well-known for his feats as a child hero in Angolan folktales. His story also became the origin myth for thunderstorms, with Sudika-mbambi representing thunder.

== Legend ==
Sudika-mbambi was the firstborn son of the daughter of the Sun and the Moon. He spoke to his mother from her womb and named himself on his birth. Immediately after his twin brother was born, Kabundungulu, both sons rebuilt the house of their parents, which was destroyed by a monster (makishi) that killed their grandfather. They were both born carrying their sword, knives, staffs, and kilembe.

Sudika-mbambi later left his family to destroy the monsters who were responsible for the destruction of their original home. He also worked together with the Kipalandes to achieve his quest, but they later betrayed him when Sudika-mbambi rescued his first wife from perils. He later went on to complete several challenges to marry his second wife, the daughter of the underworld god, Kalunga-ngombe. Though Sudika-mbambi managed to succeed in most of them, an encounter with a legendary beast, Kimbiji kia Malenda, left him mortally wounded. His twin brother, Kabungdulu, sensing that his life was in danger, rescued Sudika-mbambi and brought him back to life.
