= Umvelinqangi =

Creator

UMvelinqangi is a Nguni word which translates to "the Most High" or "Divine Consciousness"; that is considered the source of all that has been, that is and all that ever will be.

UMvelinqangi, contrary to widespread belief is not personified. Umvelinqangi is most accurately described as the creator of all things.

Ukukhothama (prostration) was a widespread practice prior to westernisation among the Zulu clan. Ukukhothama was seen as a way of attaining ubunye noMvelinqangi (oneness with the divine conscious). This practice is primarily the reason why the Zulu clan survived through the ages without any form of western/modern resources.

== Bibliography ==
- Callaway, Henry (1870). The Religious System of the Amazulu. Forgotten Books. p. 292. ISBN 978-1-60506-005-7.
- Rev. Canon Callaway, Unkulunkulu: The tradition of creation as existing among the Amazulu and other tribes of South Africa, 1868
