= Ngasa =

Ngasa or Ongamo may refer to:

- Ngasa people
- Ngasa language
