= Ngasa language =

Eastern Nilotic language

Ngasa
- Ongamo
- Native to: Tanzania
- Ethnicity: Ngasa people
- Native speakers: ? (2014)
- Language family: Nilo-Saharan?: Eastern Sudanic?; Southern Eastern Sudanic?; Nilotic; Eastern Nilotic; Ateker-Lotuko–Maa; Lotuko–Maa; Ongamo-Maa; Ngasa

Language codes
- ISO 639-3: nsg
- Glottolog: ngas1238
- ELP: Ngasa

Ongamo, or Ngasa, is an extinct Eastern Nilotic language of Tanzania. It is closely related to the Maa languages, but more distantly than they are to each other. Ongamo has 60% of lexical similarity with Maasai, Samburu, and Camus. Speakers have shifted to Chagga, a dominant regional Bantu language.

== History ==
An expansion of Ngasa speakers onto the plains north of Mount Kilimanjaro occurred in the 12th century. The language was mutually intelligible with Proto-Maasai during that period. Vocabulary retention from this time attests to the cultivation of sorghum and eleusine by the Ngasa. Subsequent immigration of Bantu-speaking Chagga over the next five centuries considerably reduced the extent and viability of the Ngasa language.
