= Maasai language =

Eastern Nilotic language

Maasai
- ɔl Maa
- Native to: Kenya, Tanzania
- Region: Central and Southern Kenya and Northern Tanzania
- Ethnicity: Maasai
- Native speakers: 1.5 million (2009 census – 2016)
- Language family: Nilo-Saharan?: Eastern Sudanic; Southern Eastern; Nilotic; Eastern Nilotic; Ateker–Lotuko–Maa; Lotuko–Maa; Maa; Maasai

Language codes
- ISO 639-2: mas
- ISO 639-3: mas
- Glottolog: masa1300

Maasai (previously spelled Masai) or Maa (English: /ˈmɑːsaɪ/ MAH-sye; autonym: ɔl Maa) is an Eastern Nilotic language spoken in Southern Kenya and Northern Tanzania by the Maasai people, numbering about 1.5 million. It is closely related to the other Maa varieties: Samburu (or Sampur), the language of the Samburu people of central Kenya, Chamus, spoken south and southeast of Lake Baringo (sometimes regarded as a dialect of Samburu); and Parakuyu of Tanzania. The Maasai, Samburu, il-Chamus and Parakuyu peoples are historically related and all refer to their language as ɔl Maa. Properly speaking, "Maa" refers to the language and the culture and "Maasai" refers to the people "who speak Maa".

== Phonology ==
The Maasai variety of ɔl Maa as spoken in southern Kenya and Tanzania has 30 contrasting phonemes, including a series of implosive consonants. In Maasai, tone has a very productive role, conveying a wide range of grammatical and semantic functions.

=== Consonants ===
In the table of consonant phonemes below, phonemes are represented with IPA symbols. When IPA conventions differ from symbols normally used in practical writing, the latter are given in angle brackets.

		Labial	Alveolar	Alveopalatal / palatal	Velar	Glottal
Nasal		m	n	ɲ ⟨ny⟩	ŋ ⟨ŋ ~ ng⟩	
Plosive	pulmonic	p	t		k	ʔ ⟨' ~ ʔ⟩
Plosive	implosive	ɓ ⟨b⟩	ɗ ⟨d⟩	ʄ ⟨j⟩	ɠ ⟨g⟩	
Fricative			s	ʃ ⟨sh⟩		h
Rhotic	tap		ɾ ⟨r⟩			
Rhotic	trill		r ⟨rr⟩			
Lateral			l			
Glide	lenis	w		j ⟨y⟩		
Glide	fortis	wː ⟨wu⟩		jː ⟨yi⟩		

For some speakers, implosive consonants are not ingressive (e.g. IlKeekonyokie Maa), but for others, they are lightly implosive or have a glottalic feature (e.g. Parakuyo Maa). In Arusha Maa, /p/ is typically realized as a voiceless fricative [ɸ], but in some words, it can be a voiced trill [ʙ]. The sounds [tʃ] and [ʃ] occur in complementary distribution, with [tʃ] occurring following a consonant, and [ʃ] elsewhere.

=== Vowels ===
There are nine vowel phoneme qualities in Maasai.

	Front	Central	Back
High	i		u
High	ɪ ⟨ɨ⟩		ʊ ⟨ʉ⟩
Mid	e		o
Mid	ɛ		ɔ
Low		a	

==== Vowel harmony ====
A feature that Maasai shares with the other Maa languages is advanced tongue root vowel harmony. In Maasai words, only certain combinations of vowels co-occur in the same word (i.e. vowel harmony), with the vowel /a/ being "neutral" in this system. In Maasai, advanced tongue vowels only co-occur with other advanced tongue vowels (i.e. /i e o u/) and /a/, whereas non-advanced tongue vowels (i.e. /ɪ ɛ ʊ ɔ/) only co-occur with each other and with /a/. Note that tones play no role in the harmony system.

Tongue root position	Phonemes	Phonology	Spelling	English
Advanced tongue root	/ i e o u /	/ éɓúl /	ébúl	“S/he will pierce it”
Advanced tongue root	/ i e o u /	/ ōlmōsōrî /	ol-mosorrî	“Egg”
Advanced tongue root	/ i e o u /	/ ēnkītōʄó /	en-kitojó	“Rabbit”
Retracted tongue root	/ ɪ ɛ ʊ ɔ /	/ ɛ́ɓʊ́l /	ɛ́bʉ́l	“S/he will prosper”
Retracted tongue root	/ ɪ ɛ ʊ ɔ /	/ ɛ̄nkʊ́tʊ́k /	ɛn-kʉ́tʉ́k	“Mouth”
Retracted tongue root	/ ɪ ɛ ʊ ɔ /	/ kɪ̄ʊ́tɪ̄ʃɔ̄ /	kɨʉ́tɨshɔ	“Index finger”
Neutral	/ a /	/ ātūmōkî /	atumokî	“To have a good opportunity”
Neutral	/ a /	/ ātʊ̄mʊ́k /	atʉmʉ́k	“To brew”

=== Writing system ===
Maasai is written using the Latin script with additional letters taken from the IPA, namely ⟨ɛ ɨ ŋ ɔ ʉ⟩, where the barred letters represent the near-close vowels. The orthography uses a few digraphs (e.g. ⟨rr⟩ for /r/, ⟨sh⟩ for /ʃ), and diacritics on vowels to represent tones. In this system, level tones are not represented, so that /ā ē ū/ etc. are represented as ⟨a e u⟩ and so forth.

Tone representation in Maasai orthography
	/i/	/ɪ/	/e/	/ɛ/	/a/	/ɔ/	/o/	/ʊ/	/u/
Rising	í	ɨ́	é	ɛ́	á	ɔ́	ó	ʉ́	ú
Level	i	ɨ	e	ɛ	a	ɔ	o	ʉ	u
Low	ì	ɨ̀	è	ɛ̀	à	ɔ̀	ò	ʉ̀	ù
Falling	î	ɨ̂	ê	ɛ̂	â	ɔ̂	ô	ʉ̂	û

== Morphosyntax ==
Word order is usually verb–subject–object but can vary because tone is the most salient indicator of the distinction between subject and object roles. What determines the order in a clause is topicality since the order, in the simplest clauses, can be predicted according to the information structure pattern: [Verb – Most.Topical – Less.Topical]. Thus, if the object is highly topical in the discourse (e.g. a first-person pronoun), and the subject is less topical, the object occurs right after the verb and before the subject.

The Maasai language has only two fully-grammatical prepositions but can use relational nouns, along with a most general preposition, to designate specific locative ideas. Noun phrases begin with a demonstrative prefix or a gender-number prefix, followed by a quantifying noun or other head noun. Other modifiers follow the head noun, including possessive phrases.

In Maasai, many morphemes are tone patterns. The tone pattern affects the case, voice and aspect of words, as in the example below:

ɛ́yɛ́tá ɛmʊtí
ɛ̀-ɛ́t-á ɛn-mʊtí(LH)
3P-remove.one.by.one-PFV.SG DEF.FEM.SG-pot(ACC)
"She removed (meat) from the pot."

ɛyɛ́ta ɛmʊ́ti
ɛ̀-ɛ́t-a ɛn-mʊ́ti(HL)
3P-remove.one.by.one-IPFV.MID DEF.FEM.SG-pot(NOM)
"The pot is de-meated."

=== Noun classes ===
There are three noun classes in Maasai: feminine, masculine, and place. Noun classes are often indexed via prefixes on nouns (ol-/ɔl- for masculine, e[n]/ɛ[n]- for feminine), although other word classes such as demonstratives may also index gender. Although words belong to a given class (e.g. ɔl-aláshɛ̀ “brother”; ɛn-kái “God”), some roots can also occur with both prefixes (e.g. ol-ŋatúny “lion” vs. e-ŋatúny “lion-ness”).

"Who has come?" would be asked if the gender of the visitor were known. The noun would be preceded by a gendered prefix. If the gender of the visitor were unknown, "It is who that has come?" would be the literal translation of the English question.

Adjectives in Maa serve only to describe the noun and inflect based on the noun described.

Pronouns in Maa usually have a gender (male, female, or place); if the gender is unknown, the meaning of the noun in context usually refers to a gender. For example, the context of a female might include working in the house, and a male gender would be implied if the action referred to work outside the home. Maasai uses place as a personal pronoun because place can help identify male or female (i.e. an action occurring in the house is almost always done by a female).

=== Tense-aspect-mood ===
Present tense in Maasai includes habitual actions, such as "I wake up" or "I cook breakfast". Past tense refers only to a past action, not to a specific time or place.

== Oral literature ==
In 1905, Alfred Claud Hollis published The Masai: Their Language and Folklore, which contains a grammar of the Maasai language, along with texts in Maasai and English translation. The texts include stories, myths, proverbs, riddles, and songs (lyrics but no music), along with customs and beliefs explained in Maasai. Here are some of the proverbs:

- "Eata en-gewarie 'n-giyaa." "The night has ears (cf. "walls have ears")." (#3)
- "Eitu-kidol ti-oreren en-gerr sambu." "There is not such a thing in the world as a sheep of many colours (i.e. a sheep of two or even three colours is common enough, but one of more than three colors is unknown; this saying is used to express incredulity at an improbable story)." (#5)
- "Ekwenikye 'n-guk in-guruon." "Coals laugh at the ashes (not knowing that the same fate which has befallen them will befall it)." Also: "Ekwenikye ol-chata otii ol-tiren ol-otii en-gima." "The firewood which has been cut ready for burning laughs at that which is being consumed." (#6)
- "Etejo ol-ngojine: Mme ake amunyak, keju nemaagol." "The hyena said: It is not only that I have luck, but my leg is strong (i.e. I have luck, it is true, but I have had to work)." (#20)

Here are some of the riddles:

- "Aata 'l-muran lainei kumok, naa obo oipungoki 'n-gishu. Il-loom le-'ng-aji." "What are my warriors like? I have many of them, and one goes out to look after the cattle. The rafters of the hut (in Masai huts all the rafters are hidden except one which protrudes beyond the door; it is said to be watching the cattle)." (#2)
- "Aata 'n-dapan ainei are naarisyo. Eng-ai o en-gap." "I have two skins, one to lie on and the other to cover myself with. The bare ground and the sky." (#5)
- "Anake eado ngutunyi nemebaiki e-nyawa e-'n-gerr? Eng-oitoi." "What does your mother resemble? She is long and yet she does not reach up to a sheep's udder. The road." (#8)

== Usage ==
The Maasai have resisted the expansion of both European languages and Swahili in East Africa. Maasai speakers engage in frequent trade using their language. However, close contact with other ethnic groups in East Africa and the rise of English as a lingua franca has led to a reduction in the speakers of Maasai. In Tanzania, former President Nyerere encouraged the adoption of Swahili as an official language to unite the many different ethnic groups in Tanzania, as well as English to compete on a global scale. Although the Maasai language, often referred to as Maa, has survived despite the mass influx of English and Swahili education systems, economic plans, and more, the socioeconomic climate that the Maasai people face in East Africa keeps them, and their language, as an under-represented minority.

The Maasai way of life is embedded in their language. Specifically, the economic systems of trade that the Maasai rely on to maintain their nomadic lifestyle rely on the Maasai language. With language endangerment, the Maasai people would continue to be threatened and their cultural integrity threatened. The minority status the language currently faces has already threatened traditional Maasai practices. Fewer and fewer groups of Maasai continue to be nomadic in the region, choosing to settle instead in close-knit communities to keep their language and other aspects of their culture alive.

== See also ==
- Kwavi dialect
- Sonjo language, the language of a Bantu enclave in Maasai territory
- Yaaku, people who almost completely abandoned their language in favour of Maasai
- Asa, people who completely abandoned their language in favour of Maasai

== Bibliography ==
- Andrason, Alexander; Karani, Michael (December 2019). "Dative applicative elements in Arusa (Maa): A canonical approach to the argument-adjunct distinction". Stellenbosch Papers in Linguistics Plus. 58. doi:10.5842/58-0-842.
- Andrason, Alexander; Karani, Michael (2017a). "The perfective form in Arusa – A cognitive-grammaticalization model". Asian and African Studies. 26 (1): 69–101.
- Andrason, Alexander; Karani, Michael (2017b). "Radial Categories in Syntax: Non-Resumptive Left Dislocation in Arusa". Studia Linguistica Universitatis Iagellonicae Cracoviensis. 134 (3): 205–218. doi:10.4467/20834624SL.17.014.7088.
- Karani, Michael; Kotikash, Leonard; Sentero, Peter (2014). A Unified Standard Orthography for Maa Languages, Kenya and Tanzania: Arusa, Ilchamus, Maasai/Kisongo, Parakuyu, Samburu. Monograph series. Vol. 257. Cape Town: CASAS. ISBN 978-1-920287-68-9.
- Karani, Michael (2018). Syntactic categories and the verb-argument complex in Parakuyo Maasai (PhD thesis). Stellenbosch University. hdl:10019.1/103451.
- Mol, Frans (1995). Lessons in Maa: a grammar of Maasai language. Lemek: Maasai Center. OCLC 35633230.
- Mol, Frans (1996). Maasai language & culture: dictionary. Maasai Centre Lemek. OCLC 37615708.
- Tucker, Archibald N.; Mpaayei, J. Tompo Ole (1955). A Maasai grammar with vocabulary. London: Longmans, Green & Co. OCLC 6458934.
- Vossen, Rainer (1982). The Eastern Nilotes. Linguistic and historical reconstructions. Kölner Beiträge zur Afrikanistik. Vol. 9. Berlin: Dietrich Reimer. ISBN 3-496-00698-6.
