= Kwavi dialect =

Maasai dialect of Tanzania

Kwavi
- Parakuyo
- Native to: Tanzania
- Ethnicity: Kwavi people
- Native speakers: (undated figure of 30,000)
- Language family: Nilo-Saharan?: Eastern Sudanic; Eastern Nilotic; Lotuxo-Teso; Lotuxo-Maa; Maa; Maasai; Kwavi

Language codes
- ISO 639-3: –
- Glottolog: para1304

Kwavi is the dialect of Maasai spoken by the Kwavi people (a.k.a. Parakuyo or Baraguyu) of Tanzania. According to Hurskainen (1994), "The Parakuyo (earlier also called Ilparakuyo, Baraguyu, Kwavi, Lumbwa, and Iloikop) are a Maa-speaking ethnic group scattered over a large area in the northeastern and central parts of Tanzania", while Beidelman (1960) confirms that "Kwavi" and "Baraguyu" are synonymous.

== Bibliography ==
- T.O. Beidelman. "The Baraguyu", in Tanganyika notes and records, 1960, no. 55, p. 244–278.
- Arvi Hurskainen. "Plant taxonomy of the Parakuyo (Tanzania)" in Nordic Journal of African Studies, 1994, vol. 3, no. 2, p. 117–162
- Karsten Legère. 2002. The "Languages of Tanzania" Project: background, resources and perspectives. Africa and Asia, No. 2, 2002.
