= Maasai people =

Ethnic group of Kenya and Tanzania

Maasai
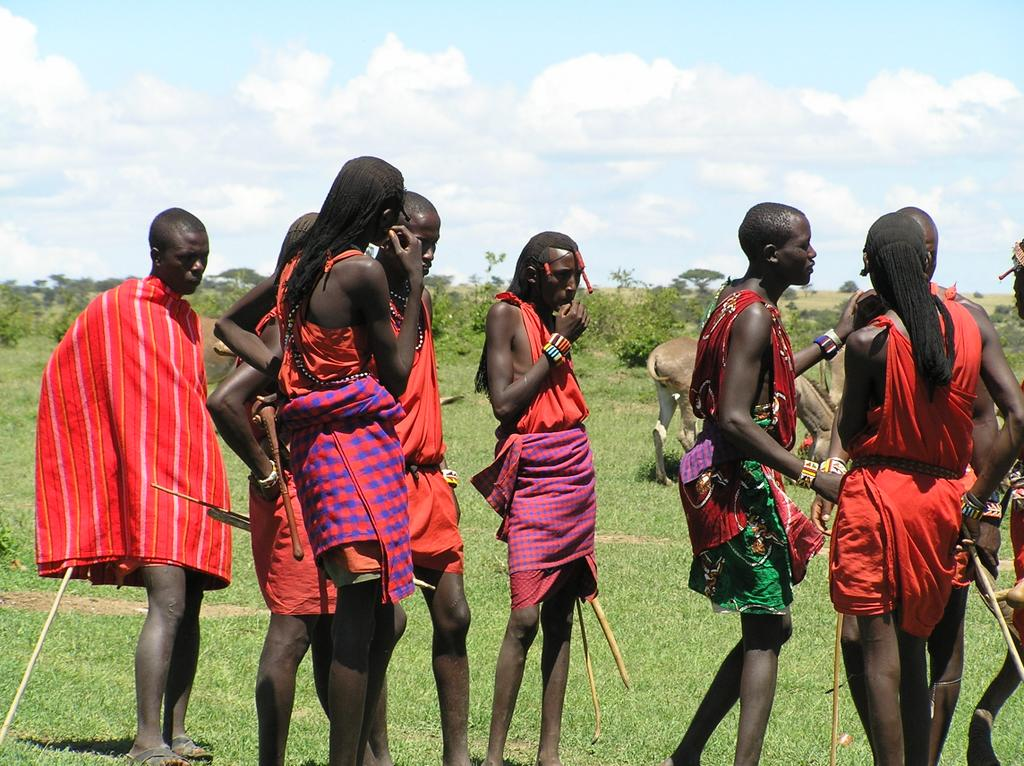
- A gathering of Maasai men in 2005

Total population
- approx. 2.1 Million

Regions with significant populations
- Kenya: 1,189,522 (2019)
- Tanzania: approx. 1,000,000 (2024)

Languages
- Maa, Swahili, English

Religion
- Christianity, Maasai religion and Islam

Related ethnic groups
- Samburu, Ilchamus

The Maasai (/ˈmɑːsaɪ, mɑːˈsaɪ/) are an Eastern Nilotic ethnic group native to northern, central and southern regions of Kenya including northern Tanzania, near the African Great Lakes region. Their native language is Maa, a Nilotic language related to Dinka, Kalenjin and Nuer, a branch within the broader Nilo-Saharan language family. Except for some elders living in rural areas, most Maasai people speak the official languages of Kenya and Tanzania—Swahili and English.

The Maasai population has been reported as numbering 1,189,522 in Kenya in the 2019 census compared to 377,089 in the 1989 census.

== History ==
The Maasai inhabit the African Great Lakes region and arrived via South Sudan. The Maasai, the Turkana and the Samburu, are pastoralists and have a reputation as fearsome warriors and cattle rustlers. The Maasai and other groups in East Africa have adopted customs and practices from neighbouring Cushitic-speaking groups, including the age-set system of social organization, circumcision, and vocabulary terms.

Many ethnic groups that had already formed settlements in the region were forcibly displaced by the incoming Maasai. Other, mainly Southern Cushitic groups, were assimilated into Maasai society. The Nilotic ancestors of the Kalenjin likewise absorbed some early Cushitic populations.

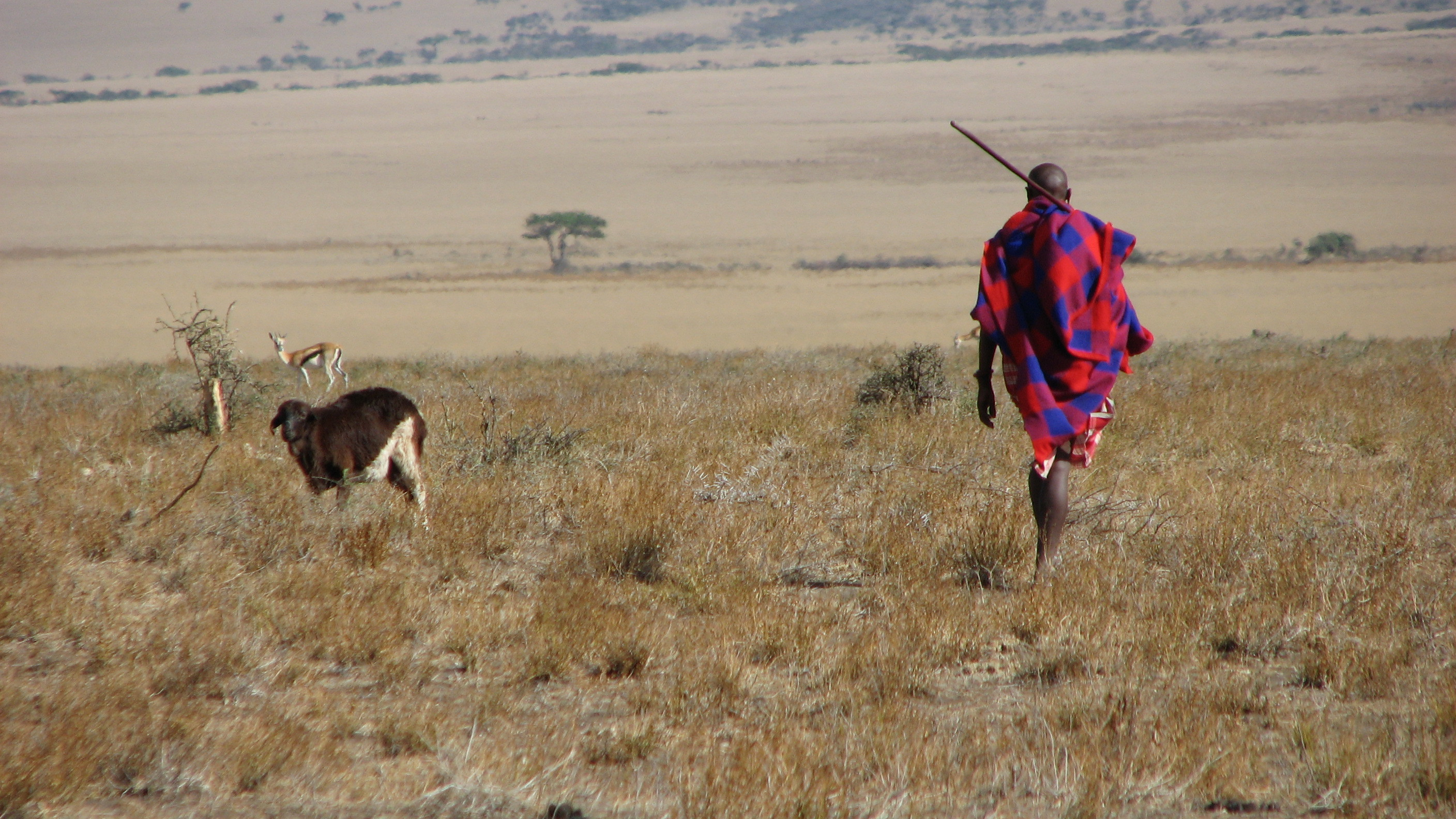
Maasai man

=== Settlement in East Africa ===
The Maasai territory reached its largest size in the mid-19th century and covered almost all of the Great Rift Valley and adjacent lands from Mount Marsabit in the north to Dodoma in the south. At this time the Maasai, as well as the larger Nilotic group they were part of, raised cattle as far east as the Tanga coast in Tanganyika (now mainland Tanzania). Raiders used spears and shields but were most feared for throwing clubs (orinka) which could be accurately thrown from up to 70 paces. In 1852, there was a report of a concentration of 800 Maasai warriors on the move in what is now Kenya. In 1857, after having depopulated the "Wakuafi wilderness" in what is now southeastern Kenya, Maasai warriors threatened Mombasa on the Kenyan coast.

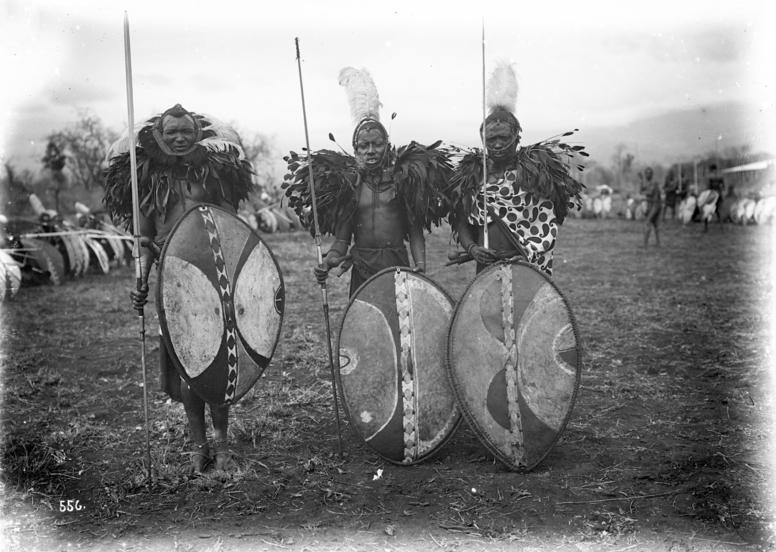
Maasai warriors in German East Africa, c. 1906–1918

Because of this migration the Maasai are the southernmost Nilotic speakers. The period of expansion was followed by the Maasai "Emutai" of 1883–1902. This period was marked by epidemics of contagious bovine pleuropneumonia, rinderpest (see 1890s African rinderpest epizootic) and smallpox. The estimate first put forward by a German lieutenant in what was then northwest Tanganyika was that 90% of cattle and half of wild animals perished from rinderpest. German doctors in the same area claimed that "every second" African had a pock-marked face as the result of smallpox. This period coincided with drought. Rains failed in 1897 and 1898.

The Austrian explorer Oscar Baumann travelled in Maasai lands between 1891 and 1893 and described the old Maasai settlement in the Ngorongoro Crater in the 1894 book Durch Massailand zur Nilquelle (Through the lands of the Maasai to the source of the Nile). By one estimate two-thirds of the Maasai died during this period. Maasai in Tanganyika (now mainland Tanzania) were displaced from the fertile lands between Mount Meru and Mount Kilimanjaro and most of the fertile highlands near Ngorongoro in the 1940s. More land was taken to create wildlife reserves and national parks: Amboseli National Park, Nairobi National Park, Maasai Mara, Samburu National Reserve, Lake Nakuru National Park and Tsavo in Kenya; and Lake Manyara, Ngorongoro Conservation Area, Tarangire and Serengeti National Park in what is now Tanzania.

Maasai are pastoralists and have resisted the urging of the Tanzanian and Kenyan governments to adopt a more sedentary lifestyle. They have demanded grazing rights to many of the national parks in both countries.

The Maasai people stood against slavery and never condoned the traffic of human beings, and outsiders looking for people to enslave avoided the Maasai.

Essentially there are twenty-two geographic sectors or sub-tribes of the Maasai community, each one having its customs, appearance, leadership and dialects. These subdivisions are known as 'nations' or 'iloshon' in the Maa language: the Keekonyokie, Ildamat, Purko, Wuasinkishu, Siria, Laitayiok, Loitai, Ilkisonko, Matapato, Dalalekutuk, Ilooldokilani, Ilkaputiei, Moitanik, Ilkirasha, Samburu, Ilchamus, Laikipiak, Loitokitoki, Larusa, Salei, Sirinket and Parakuyo.

== Genetics ==
Recent advances in genetic analyses have helped shed some light on the ethnogenesis of the Maasai people. Genetic genealogy, a tool that uses the genes of modern populations to trace their ethnic and geographic origins, has also helped clarify the possible background of modern Maasai.

=== Autosomal DNA ===
The Maasai's autosomal DNA has been examined in a comprehensive study by Tishkoff et al. (2009) on the genetic affiliations of various populations in Africa. According to the study's authors, the Maasai "have maintained their culture in the face of extensive genetic introgression". Tishkoff et al. also indicate that: "Many Nilo-Saharan-speaking populations in East Africa, such as the Maasai, show multiple cluster assignments from the Nilo-Saharan [...] and Cushitic [...] AACs, in accord with linguistic evidence of repeated Nilotic assimilation of Cushites over the past 3000 years and with the high frequency of a shared East African–specific mutation associated with lactose tolerance."

Maasai display significant West-Eurasian admixture at roughly ~20%. This type of West-Eurasian ancestry reaches up to 40-50% among specific populations of the Horn of Africa, specifically among Amharas. Genetic data and archeologic evidence suggest that East African pastoralists received West Eurasian ancestry (~25%) through Afroasiatic-speaking groups from Northern Africa or the Arabian Peninsula, and later spread this ancestry component southwards into certain Khoisan groups roughly 2,000 years ago, resulting in ~5% West-Eurasian ancestry among Southern African hunter-gatherers.

A 2019 archaeogenetic study sampled ancient remains from Neolithic inhabitants of Tanzania and Kenya, and found them to have strongest affinities with modern Horn of Africa groups. They modelled the Maasai community as having ancestry that is ~47% Pastoral Neolithic Cushitic-related and ~53% Sudanese Dinka-related.

=== Y-DNA ===
A Y chromosome study by Wood et al. (2005) tested various Sub-Saharan populations, including 26 Maasai men from Kenya, for paternal lineages. The authors observed haplogroup E1b1b-M35 (not M78) in 35% of the studied Maasai. E1b1b-M35-M78 in 15%, their ancestor with the more northerly Cushitic men, who possess the haplogroup at high frequencies lived more than 13,000 years ago. The second most frequent paternal lineage among the Maasai was Haplogroup A3b2, which is commonly found in Nilotic populations, such as the Alur; it was observed in 27% of Maasai men. The third most frequently observed paternal DNA marker in the Maasai was E1b1a1-M2 (E-P1), which is very common in the Sub-Saharan region; it was found in 12% of the Maasai samples. Haplogroup B-M60 was also observed in 8% of the studied Maasai, which is also found in 30% (16/53) of Southern Sudanese Nilotes.

=== Mitochondrial DNA ===
According to an mtDNA study by Castri et al. (2008), which tested Maasai individuals in Kenya, the maternal lineages found among the Maasai are quite diverse but similar in overall frequency to that observed in other Nilo-Hamitic populations from the region, such as the Samburu. Most of the tested Maasai belonged to various macro-haplogroup L sub-clades, including L0, L2, L3, L4 and L5. Some maternal gene flow from North and Northeast Africa was also reported, particularly via the presence of mtDNA haplogroup M lineages in about 12.5% of the Maasai samples.

== Culture ==
=== Religion ===
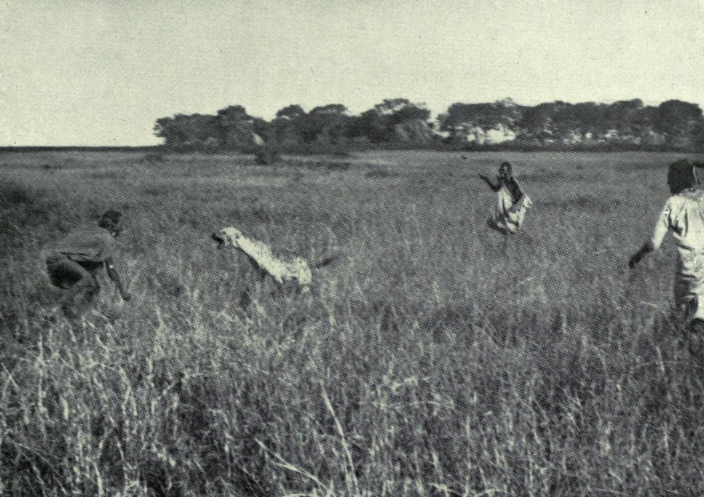
Maasai warriors confronting a spotted hyena, a common livestock predator, as photographed in In Wildest Africa (1907)

The monotheistic Maasai worship a single deity called Enkai, Nkai or Engai. Engai has a dual nature, represented by two colours: Engai Narok (Black God) is benevolent, and Engai Na-nyokie (Red God) is vengeful.

There are also two pillars or totems of Maasai society: Oodo Mongi, the Red Cow and Orok Kiteng, the Black Cow with a subdivision of five clans or family trees. The Maasai also have a totemic animal, which is the lion. The killing of a lion is used by the Maasai in the rite of passage ceremony. The "Mountain of God", Ol Doinyo Lengai, is located in northernmost Tanzania and can be seen from Lake Natron in southernmost Kenya. The central human figure in the Maasai religious system is the laibon whose roles include shamanistic healing, divination and prophecy, and ensuring success in war or adequate rainfall. Today, they have a political role as well due to the elevation of leaders. Whatever power an individual laibon had was a function of personality rather than position. Many Maasai have also adopted Christianity or Islam. The Maasai produce intricate jewellery and sell these items to tourists.

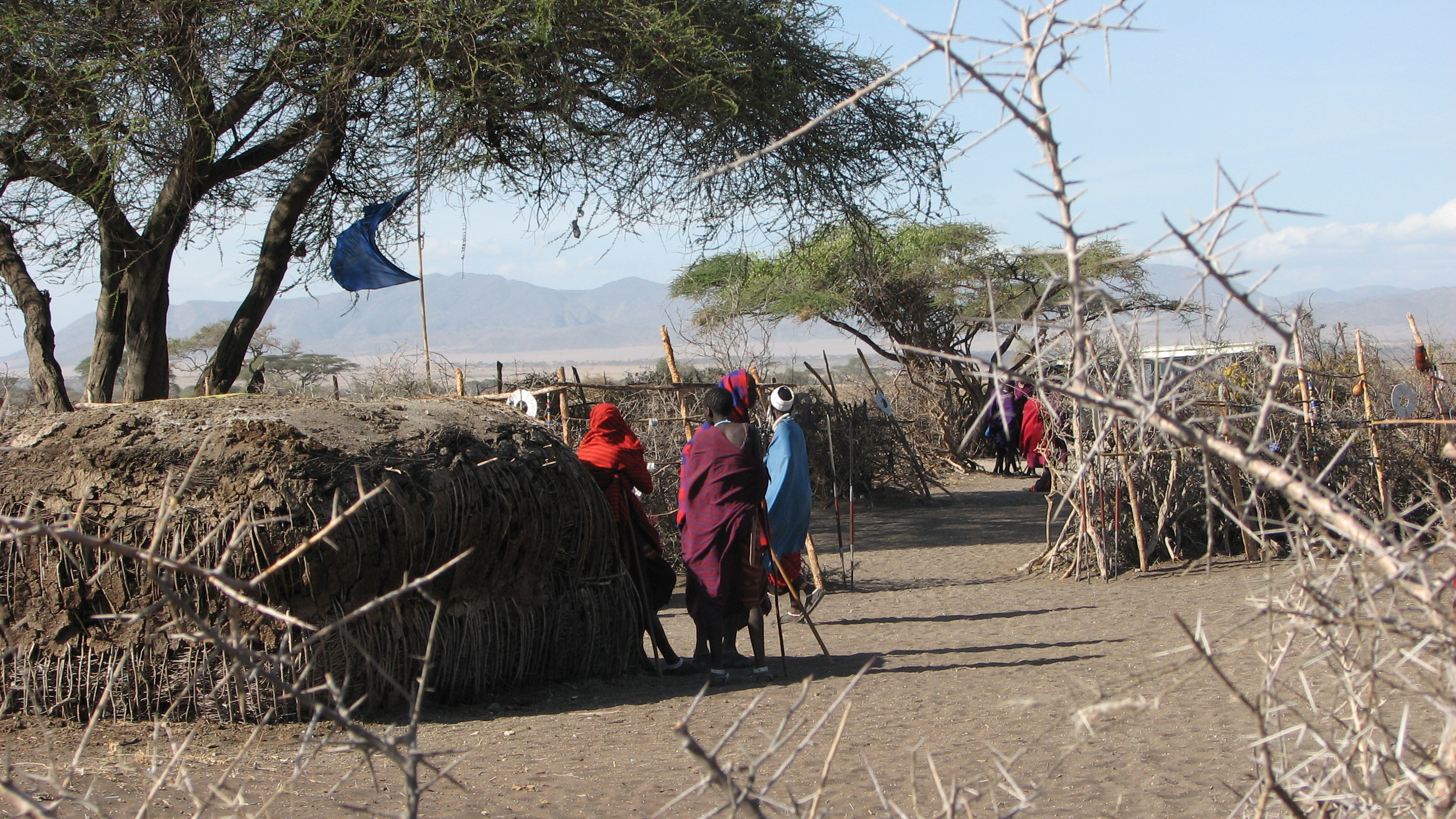
Maasai people and huts with enkang barrier in foreground –eastern Serengeti, 2006

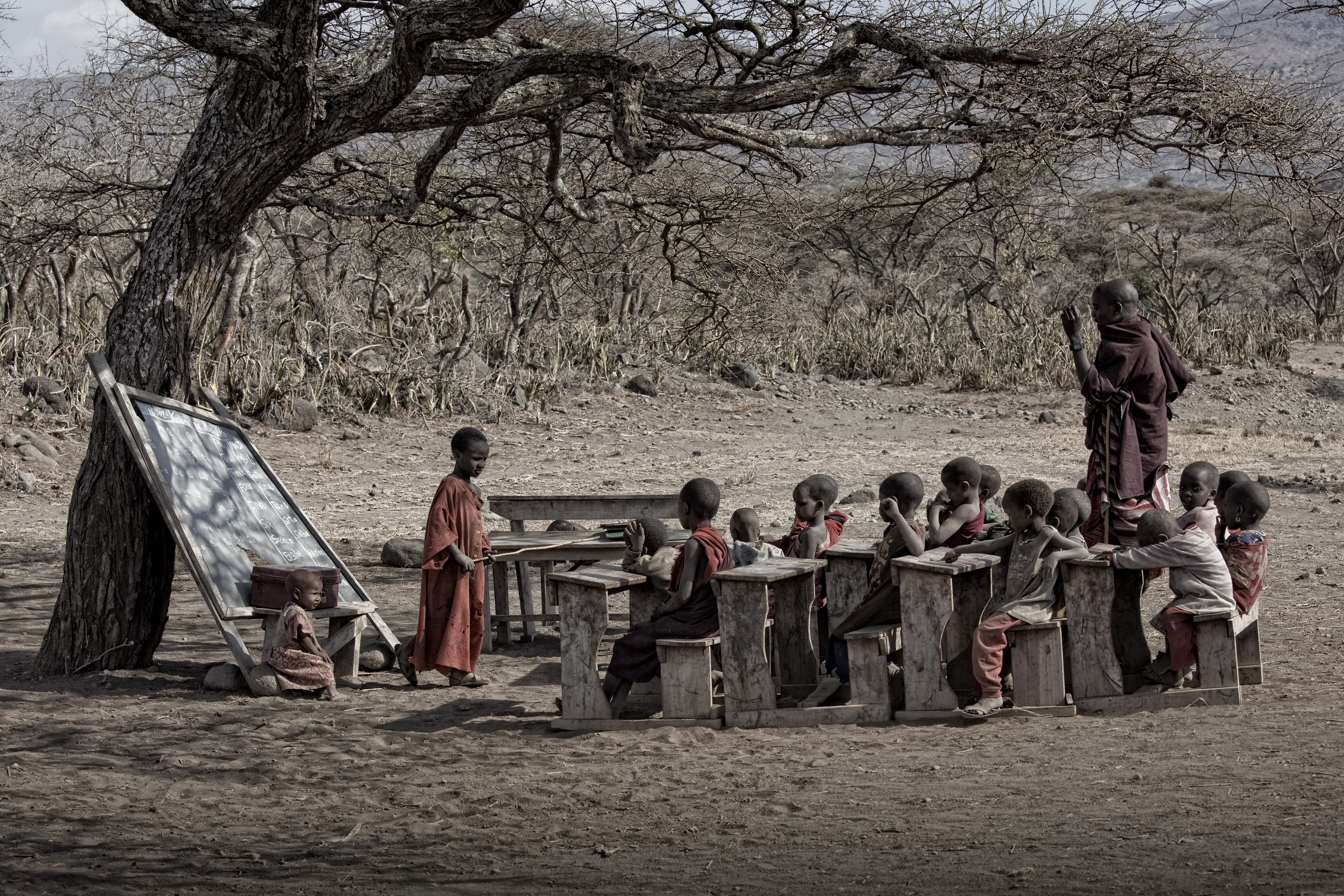
Maasai school in Tanzania

=== Body modification ===
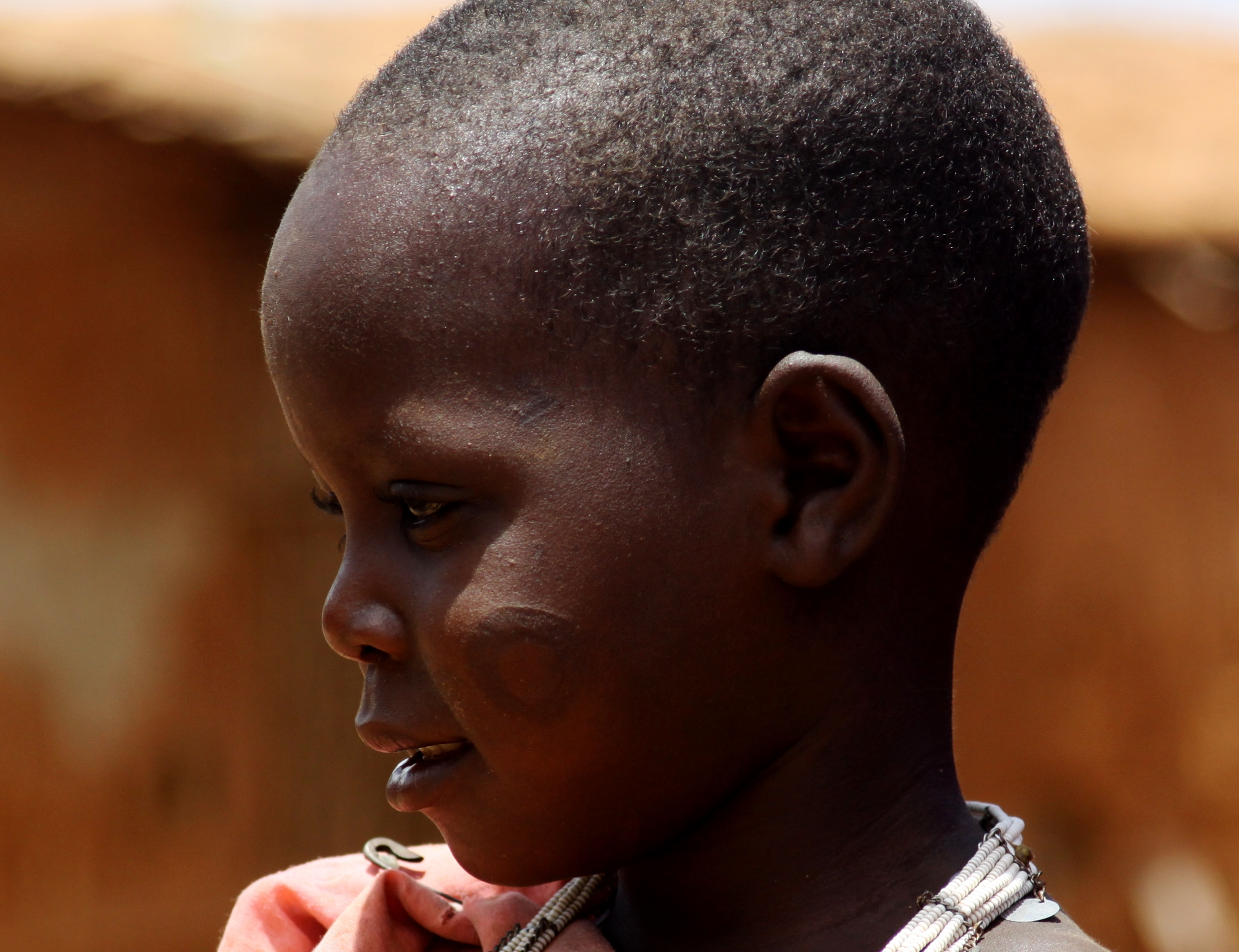
Scarification of Maasai girl on her cheek

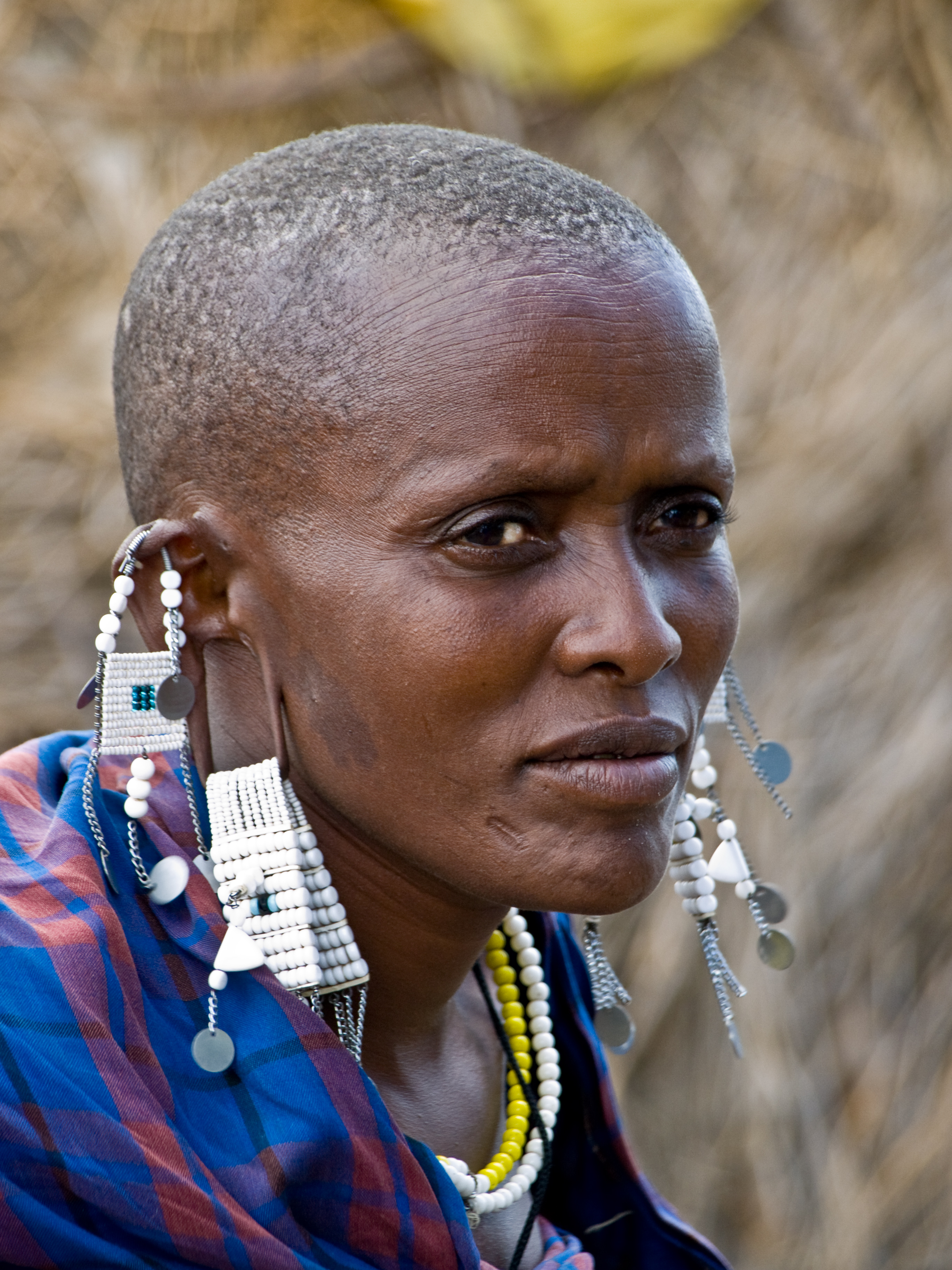
Maasai woman with stretched earlobes

The piercing and stretching of earlobes are common among the Maasai as with other tribes, and both men and women wear metal hoops on their stretched earlobes. Various materials have been used to both pierce and stretch the lobes, including thorns for piercing, twigs, bundles of twigs, stones, the cross-section of elephant tusks and empty film canisters. Women wear various forms of beaded ornaments in both the ear lobe and smaller piercings at the top of the ear. Among Maasai males, circumcision is practiced as a ritual of transition from boyhood to manhood. Women are also circumcised (as described below in social organisation).

This belief and practice are not unique to the Maasai. In rural Kenya, a group of 95 children aged between six months and two years were examined in 1991/92. 87% were found to have undergone the removal of one or more deciduous canine tooth buds. In an older age group (3–7 years of age), 72% of the 111 children examined exhibited missing mandibular or maxillary deciduous canines.

==== Genital cutting ====
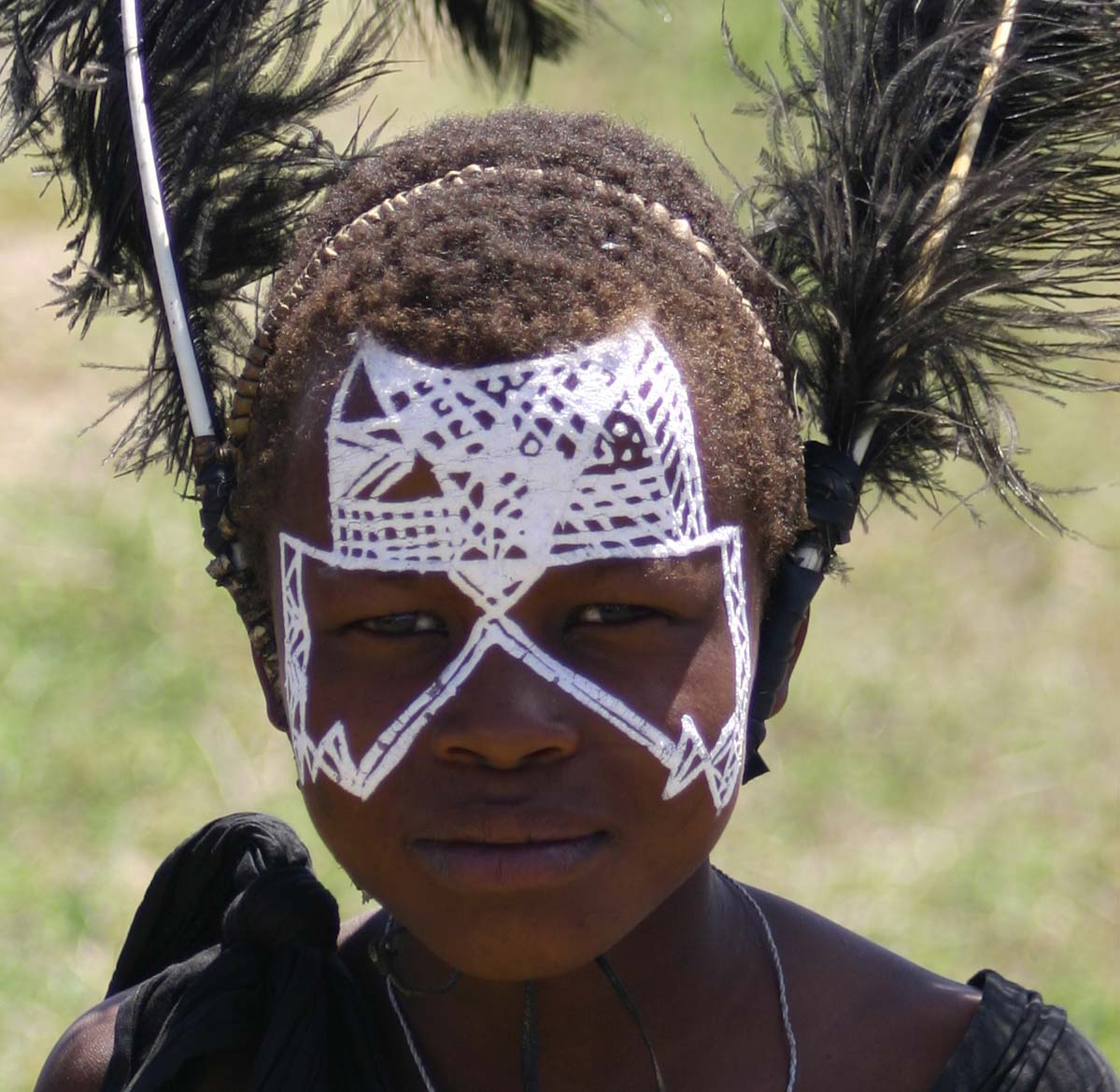
Young Maasai warrior (a junior Moran) with headdress and markings

Traditionally, the Maasai conduct elaborate rite of passage rituals which include surgical genital mutilation to initiate children into adulthood. The Maa word for circumcision, "emorata," is applied to this ritual for both males and females. This ritual is typically performed by the elders, who use a sharpened knife and makeshift cattle hide bandages for the procedure.

The male ceremony refers to the excision of the prepuce (foreskin). In the male ceremony, the boy is expected to endure the operation in silence. Expressions of pain bring dishonor upon him, albeit only temporarily. Importantly, any exclamations or unexpected movements on the part of the boy can cause the elder to make a mistake in the delicate and tedious process, which can result in severe lifelong scarring, dysfunction, and pain.

Young women also undergo female genital mutilation as part of an elaborate rite of passage ritual called "Emuatare," the ceremony that initiates young Maasai girls into adulthood through ritual mutilation and then into early arranged marriages. The Maasai believe that female genital mutilation is necessary and Maasai men may reject any woman who has not undergone it as either not marriageable or worthy of a much-reduced bride price. In Eastern Africa uncircumcised women, even highly educated members of parliament such as Linah Kilimo, can be accused of not being mature enough to be taken seriously. The Maasai activist Agnes Pareyio campaigns against the practice. The female rite-of-passage ritual has recently seen excision replaced in rare instances with a "cutting with words" ceremony involving singing and dancing in its place. However, despite changes to the law and education drives, the practice remains deeply ingrained, highly valued and nearly universally practised by members of the culture.

=== Hair ===
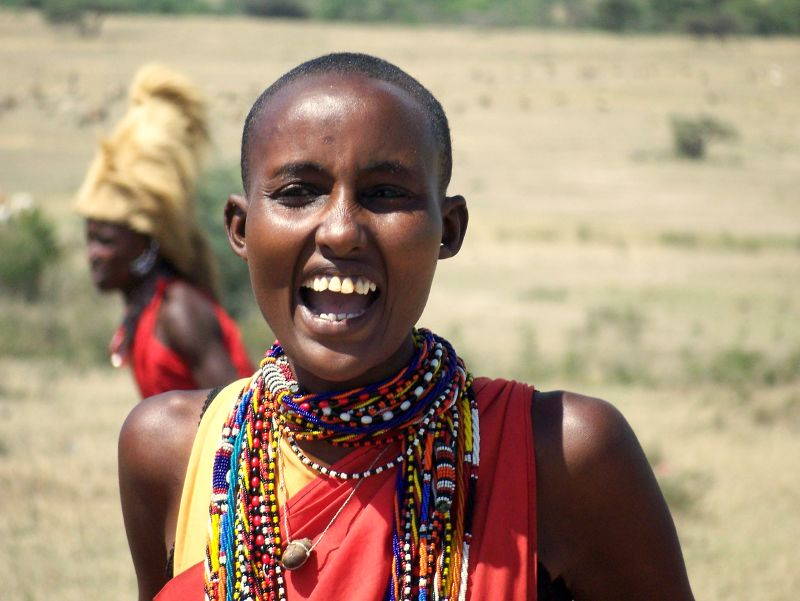
Maasai woman with short hair

Upon reaching the age of 3 "moons", the child is named and the head is shaved clean apart from a tuft of hair, which resembles a cockade, from the nape of the neck to the forehead.

Among the men, warriors are the only members of the Maasai community to wear long hair, which they weave in thinly braided strands. Graduation from warrior to junior elder takes place at a large gathering known as Eunoto. The long hair of the former warriors is shaved off; elders must wear their hair short. Warriors who do not have sexual relations with women who have not undergone the "Emuatare" ceremony are especially honoured at the Eunoto gathering.

Two days before boys are circumcised, their heads are shaved. When warriors go through the Eunoto and become elders, their long plaited hair is shaved off.

=== Music and dance ===
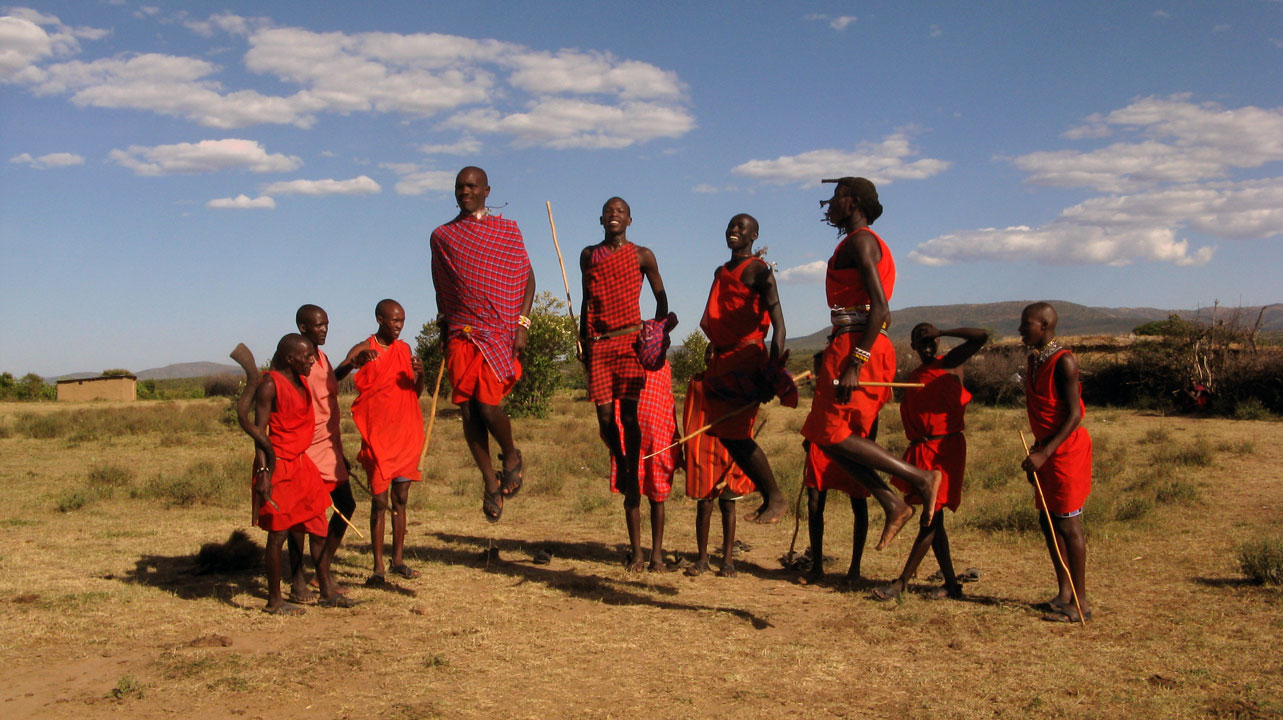
Traditional jumping dance

Maasai women's welcome dance and singing in a village, Amboseli National Park, Kenya.

Maasai music traditionally consists of rhythms provided by a chorus of vocalists singing harmonies while a song leader, or olaranyani, sings the melody. Unlike most other African tribes, Maasai widely use drone polyphony.

Women chant lullabies, humming songs, and songs praising their sons. The Namba, a call-and-response harmony pattern, repetition of nonsensical phrases, monophonic melodies, repeated phrases following each verse being sung on a descending scale, and singers responding to their verses are characteristic of singing by women. When many Maasai women gather together, they sing and dance among themselves.

Eunoto, the coming-of-age ceremony of the warrior, can involve ten or more days of singing, dancing and ritual. The warriors of the Il-Oodokilani perform a kind of march-past as well as the Adumu, or aigus, sometimes referred to as "the jumping dance" by non-Maasai. (Both adumu and aigus are Maa verbs meaning "to jump" with adumu meaning "To jump up and down in a dance".)

=== Cuisine ===
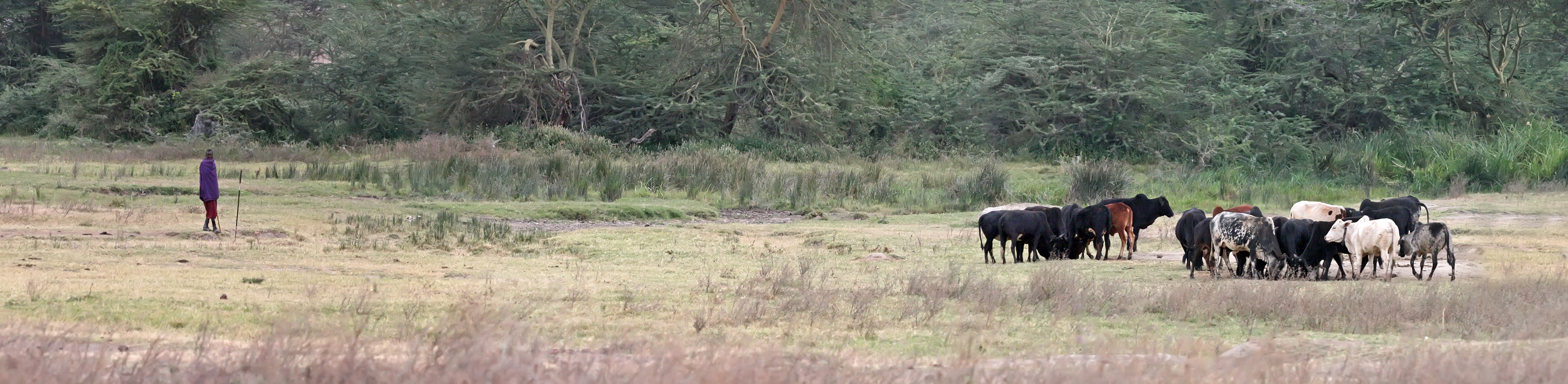
A Maasai herdsman grazing his cattle inside the Ngorongoro Conservation Area, Tanzania

Traditionally, the Maasai cuisine consisted of raw meat, raw milk, honey and raw blood from cattle—note that the Maasai cattle are of the Zebu variety. Traditional Maasai lifestyle centres around their cattle, which constitute their primary source of food. They eat their meat, drink their milk daily, and drink their blood on occasion.

In a patriarchal culture that views women as property, a man's wealth is measured in cattle, wives and children. A herd of 50 cattle is respectable, and the more wives and children the better. A man who has plenty of one but not the other is considered to be poor.

The Maasai also herd goats and sheep, including the Red Maasai sheep, as well as the more prized cattle. Bulls, goats, and lambs are slaughtered for meat on special occasions and ceremonies.

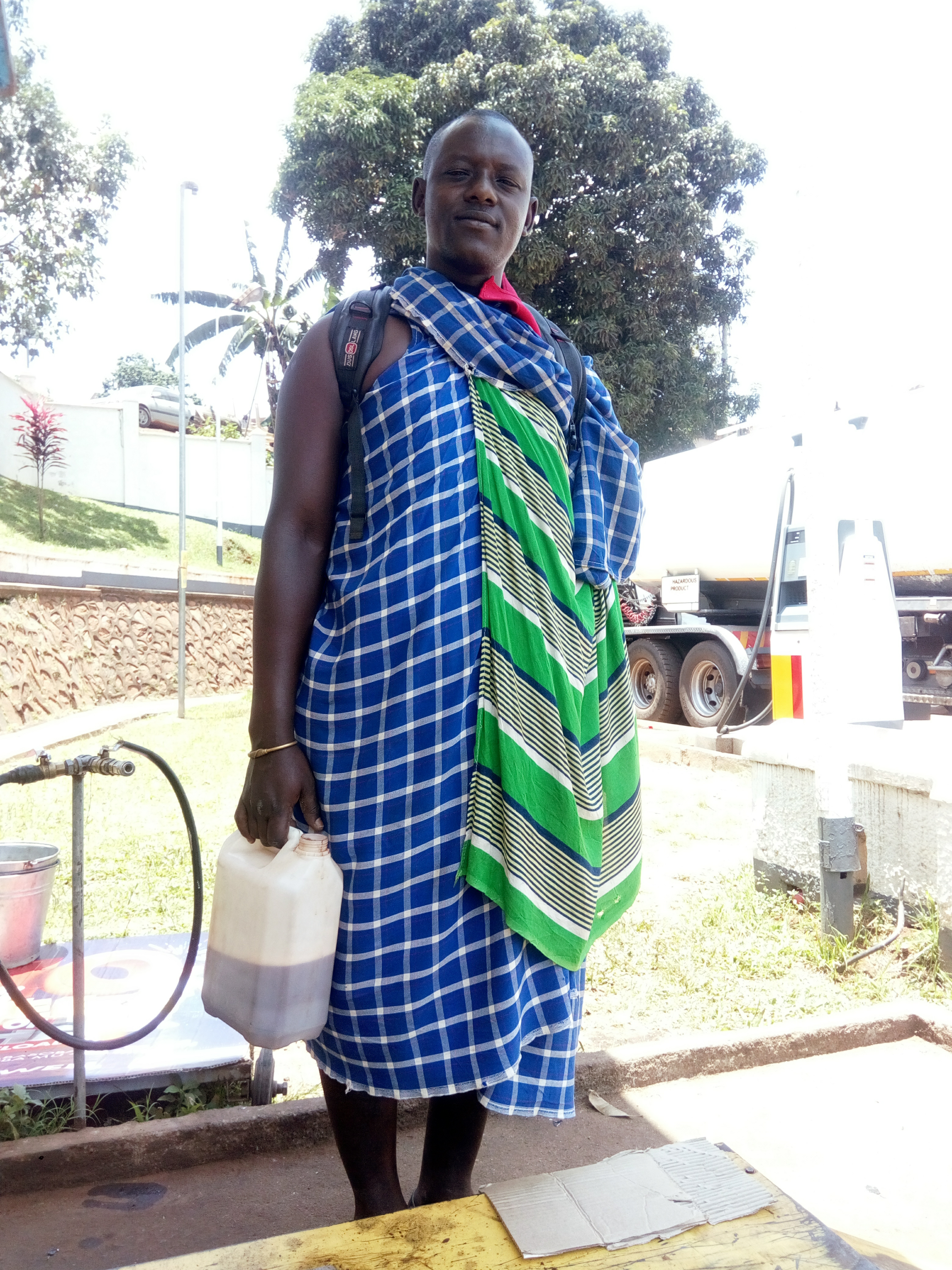
A traditional Maasai Medicines And Herbs hawker

Most of the milk is consumed as fermented milk or buttermilk (a by-product of butter making). Milk consumption figures are very high by any standards.

Fruits are consumed as snacks. They constitute a major part of the food ingested by children and women looking after cattle as well as young Maasai warriors (morans) in the bush.

The Maasai's entire way of life has historically depended on their cattle, but cattle numbers have been dwindling in recent times. The Maasai have grown dependent on food such as sorghum, rice, potatoes and cabbage (known to the Maasai as goat leaves). A 2010 study of the Maasai diet found that more than 58% of the modern Maasai diet consists of plant foods, especially ugali and cornmeal. Another study found that the staple foods of the Maasai are cows’ milk (fresh or boiled) and ugali.

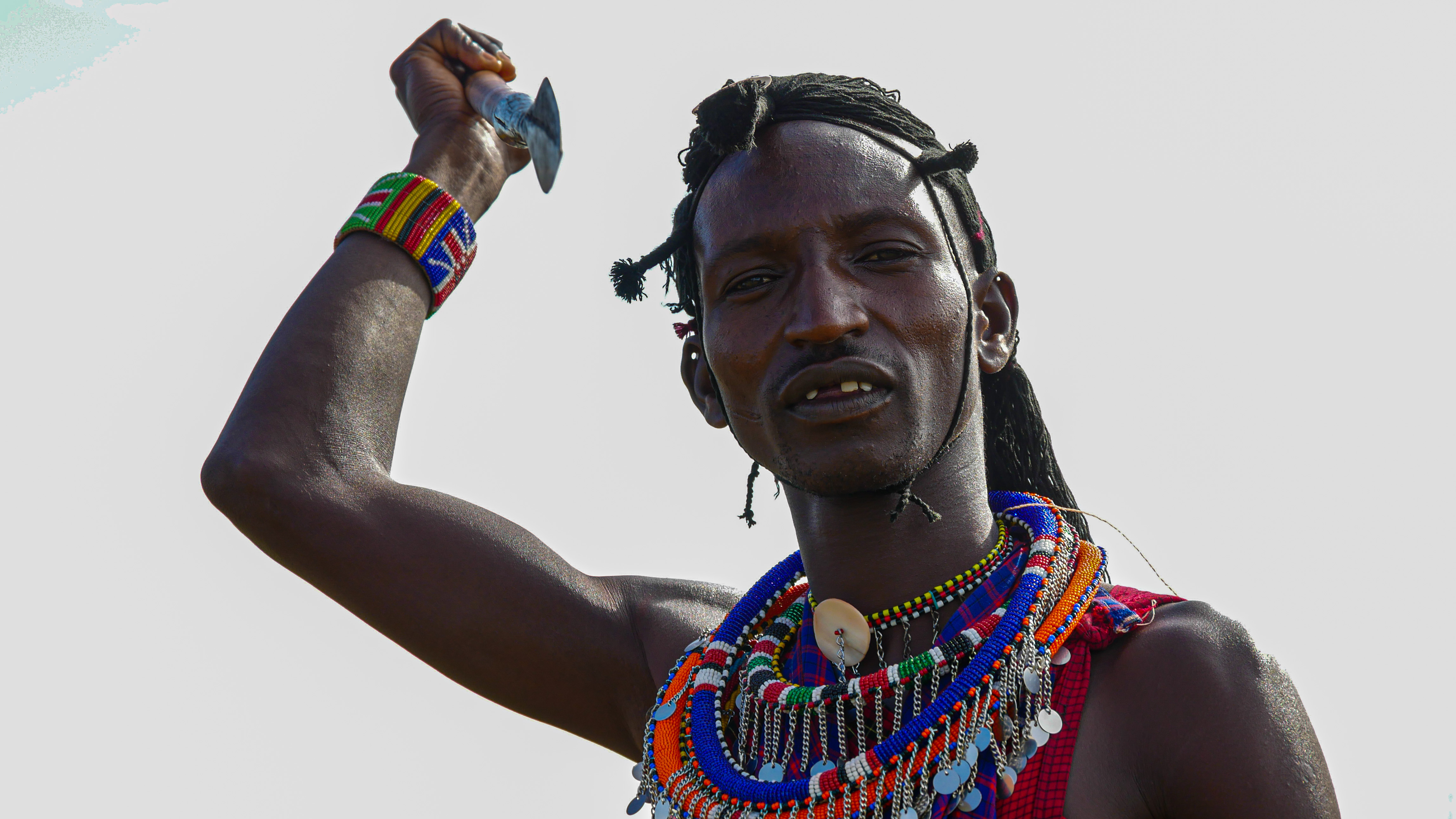
Maasai warrior 2015

One common misconception about the Maasai is that each young man is supposed to kill a lion before he can be circumcised and enter adulthood. Lion hunting was an activity of the past, but it has been banned in East Africa – yet lions are still hunted when they maul Maasai livestock. Nevertheless, killing a lion gives one great value and celebrity status in the community.

=== Medicine and healthcare ===
The Maasai people traditionally used the environment when making their medicines, and many still do, due to the high cost of Western treatments. These medicines are derived from trees, shrubs, stems, roots, etc. These can then be used in a multitude of ways including being boiled in soups and ingested to improve digestion and cleanse the blood. Some of these remedies can also be used in the treatment or prevention of diseases. The Maasai people also add herbs to different foods to avoid stomach upsets and give digestive aid. The use of plant-based medicine remains an important part of Maasai life.

Educating Maasai women to use clinics and hospitals during pregnancy has enabled more infants to survive. The exception is found in extremely remote areas. A corpse rejected by scavengers is seen as having something wrong with it, and liable to cause social disgrace; therefore, it is not uncommon for bodies to be covered in fat and blood from a slaughtered ox.

=== Shelter ===
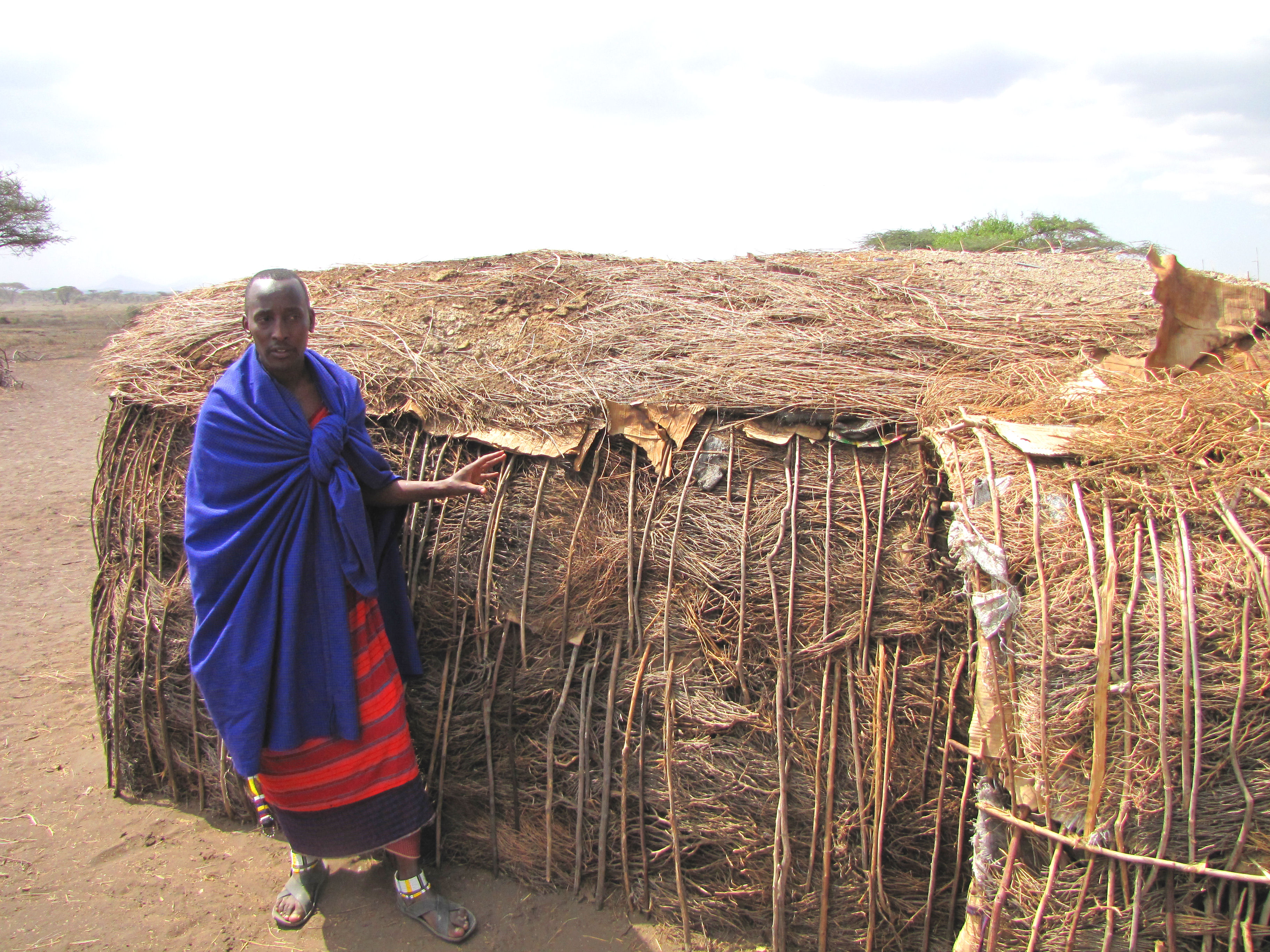
Shelter covered in cattle dung for waterproofing

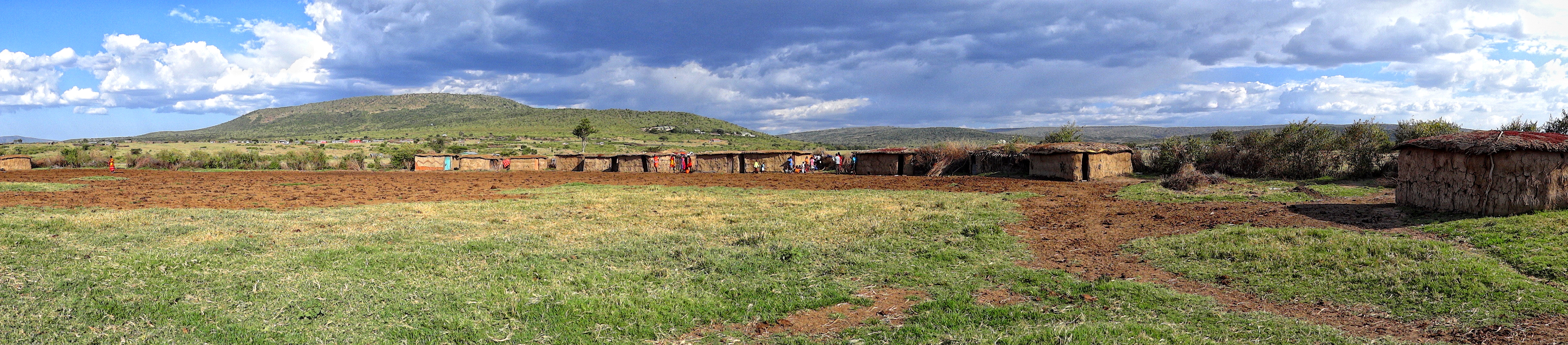
Panoramic view of Maasai Enkang, seen from the inside
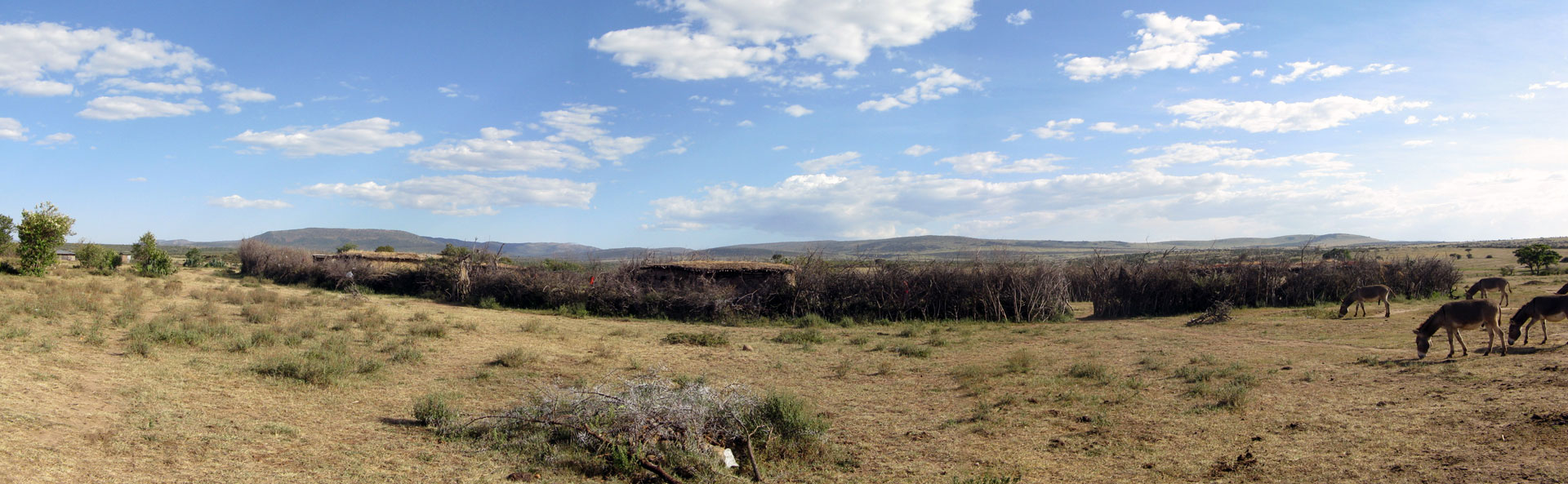
Panoramic view of Maasai Enkang, seen from the outside

=== Clothing ===
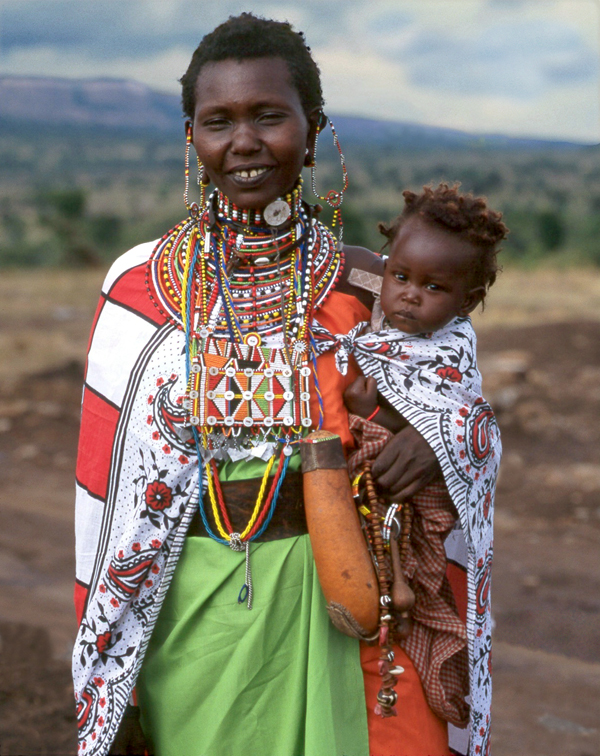
A Maasai woman wearing her finest clothes

Maasai clothing symbolises ethnic group membership, a pastoralist lifestyle, as well as an individual's social position. From this they can decide the roles they undertake for the tribe. Jewellery also can show an individual's gender, relationship status, and age. Maasai traditional clothing is both a means of tribal identification and symbolism: young men, for example, wear black for several months following their circumcision.

The Maasai began to replace animal skin, calf hides and sheep skin with commercial cotton cloth in the 1960s.

Shúkà is the Maa word for sheets traditionally worn and wrapped around the body. These are typically red, sometimes integrated with other colours and patterns. One-piece garments known as kanga, a Swahili term, are common. Maasai near the coast may wear kikoi, a sarong-like garment that comes in many different colours and textiles

=== Influences from the outside world ===
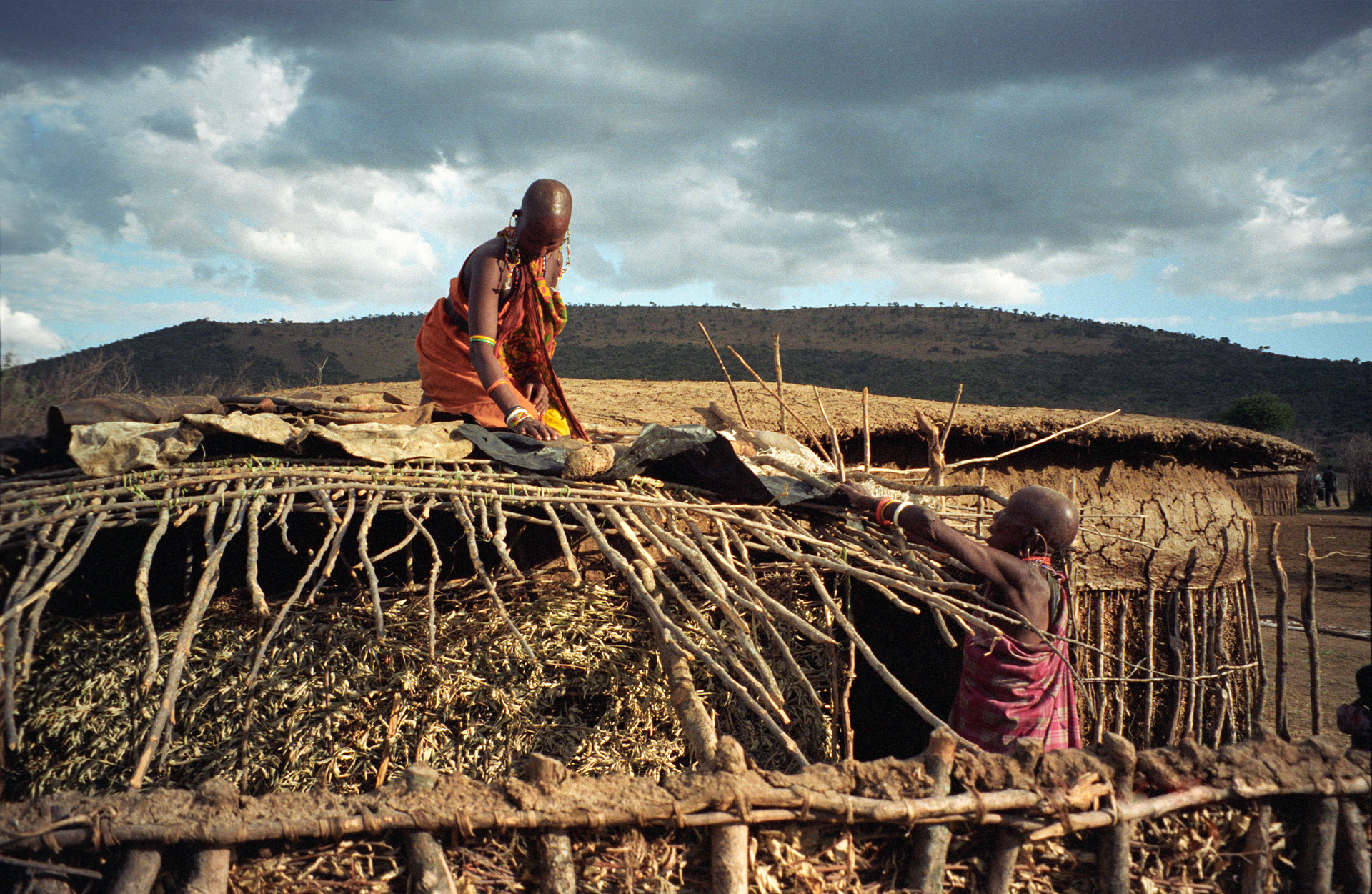
Maasai women repairing a house in Maasai Mara (1996)

A traditional pastoral lifestyle has become increasingly difficult due to modern outside influences. Garrett Hardin's article outlining the "tragedy of the commons", as well as Melville Herskovits' "cattle complex" influenced ecologists and policymakers about the harm Maasai pastoralists were causing to savannah rangelands. This was later contested by some anthropologists. British colonial policymakers in 1951 removed all Maasai from the Serengeti National Park and relegated them to areas in and around the Ngorongoro Conservation Area (NCA).

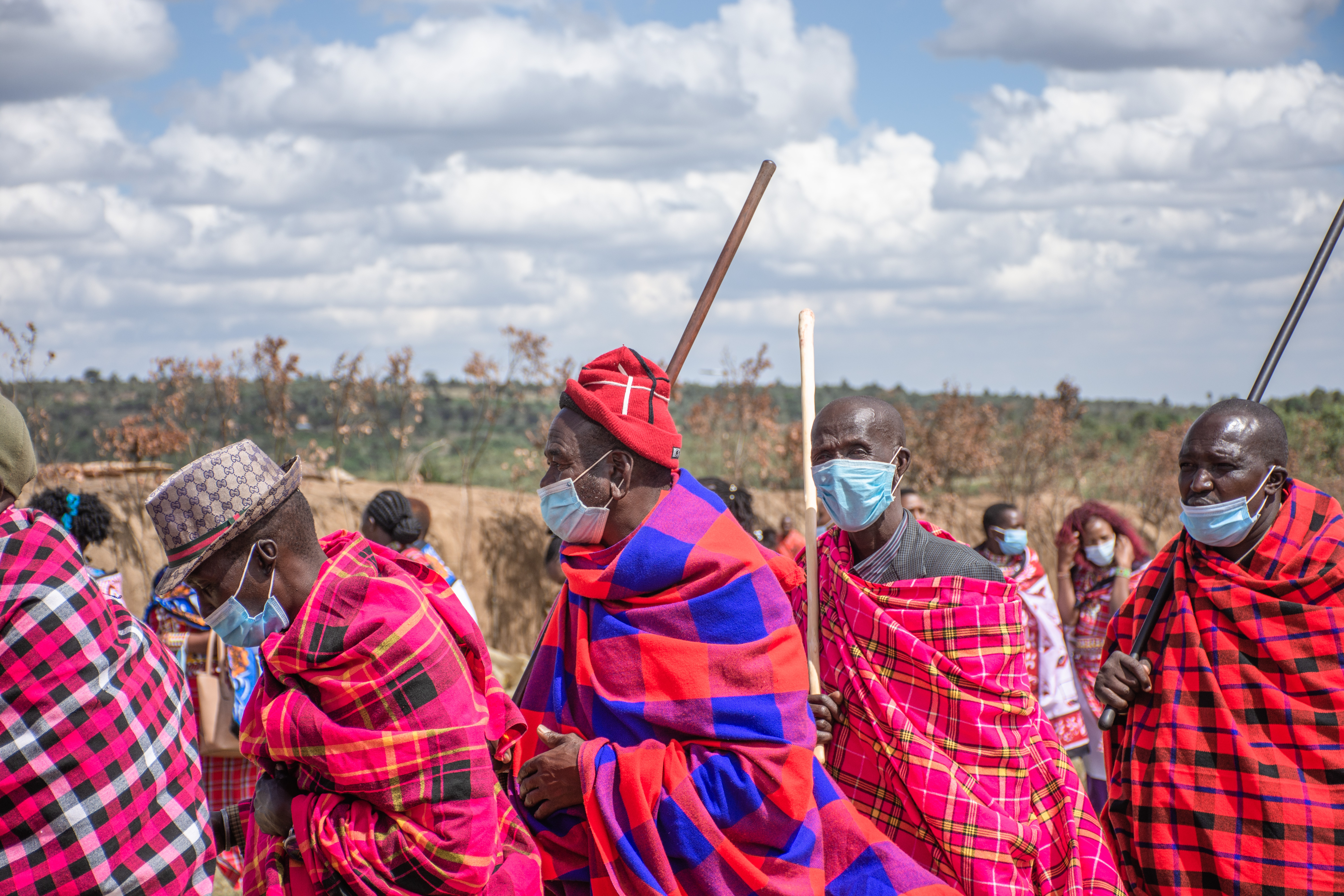
Maasai wearing protective masks during COVID-19 pandemic.

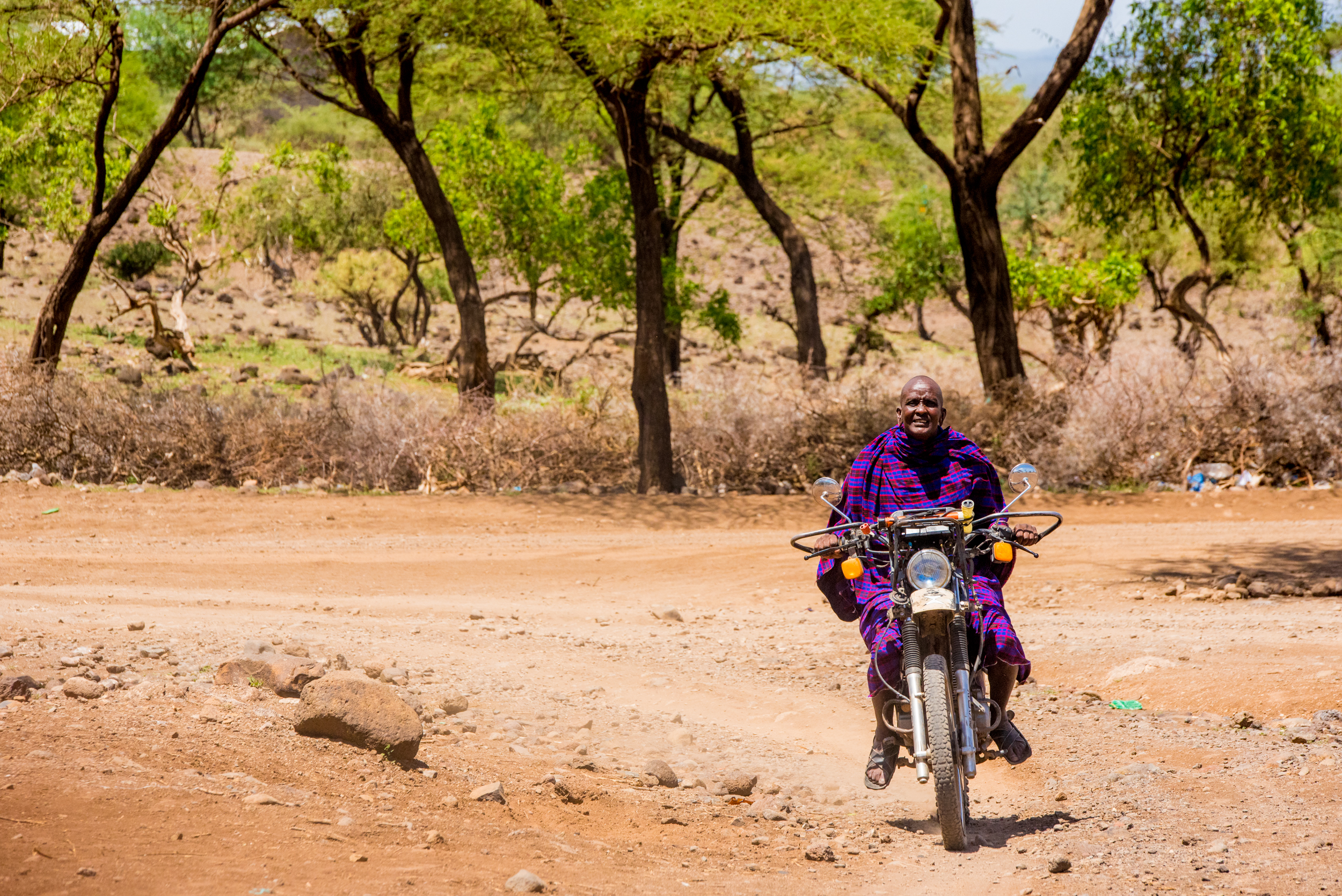
Maasai riding a motorcycle (2014)

Due to an increasing population, loss of cattle due to disease, and lack of available rangelands because of new park boundaries and competition from other tribes, the Maasai were forced to develop new ways of sustaining themselves. Many Maasai began to cultivate maize and other crops to get by, a practice that was culturally viewed negatively. Cultivation was first introduced to the Maasai by displaced WaArusha and WaMeru women who married Maasai men.

In 1975, the Ngorongoro Conservation Area banned cultivation, forcing the tribe to participate in Tanzania's economy. They have to sell animals and traditional medicines to buy food. The ban on cultivation was lifted in 1992 and cultivation became an important part of Maasai livelihood once more. Park boundaries and land privatisation has continued to limit the Maasai livestock's grazing area.

Throughout the years, various projects have attempted to help the Maasai people. These projects help find ways to preserve Maasai traditions while also encouraging modern education for their children.

Emerging employment among the Maasai people include farming, business, and wage employment in both the public and private sectors.

Many Maasai have also moved away from the nomadic life to positions in commerce and government.

== Eviction from ancestral land ==
The Maasai community was reportedly being targeted with live ammunition and tear gas in June 2022 in Tanzania, in a government plan to seize a piece of Maasai land for elite private luxury development. Lawyers, human rights groups, and activists who brought the matter to light claimed that Tanzanian security forces tried to forcefully evict the indigenous Maasai people from their ancestral land for the establishment of a luxury game reserve by Otterlo Business Corporation (OBC) for the royals ruling the United Arab Emirates. As of 18 June 2022, approximately 30 Maasai people had been injured and at least one killed, at the hands of the Tanzanian government Field Force Unit (FFU) while protesting the government's plans of what it claims are delimiting a 1500 sq km of land as a game reserve, an act which violates a 2018 East African Court of Justice (EACJ) injunction on the land dispute, per local activists. By reclassifying the area as a game reserve, the authorities aimed to systematically expropriate Maasai settlements and grazing in the area, experts warned.

This was not the first time Maasai territory was encroached upon. Big-game hunting firms along with the government have long attacked the groups. The 2022 attacks are the latest escalation, which has left more than 150,000 Maasai displaced from the Loliondo and Ngorongoro areas as per the United Nations. A hunting concession already situated in Loliondo is owned by OBC, a company that has been allegedly linked to the significantly wealthy Emirati royal family as per Tanzanian lawyers, environmentalists as well as human rights activists. Anuradha Mittal, the executive director of the environmental think-tank, Oakland Institute cited that OBC was not a "safari company for just everyone, it has operations for the royal family".

A 2019 United Nations report described OBC as a luxury-game hunting company "based in the United Arab Emirates" that was granted a hunting license by the Tanzanian government in 1992 permitting "the UAE royal family to organise private hunting trips" in addition to denying the Maasai people access to their ancestral land and water for herding cattle.

When approached, the UAE government refrained from giving any statements. Meanwhile, the OBC commented on the matter without addressing alleged links with Emirati royals, stating that "there is no eviction in Loliondo" and calling it a "reserve land protected area" owned by the government.

== Notable Maasai ==
- Linus Kaikai – Kenyan journalist and Chair of the Kenya Editors Guild
- Francis Ole Kaparo – Former Speaker of the National Assembly of Kenya
- James Ole Kiyiapi – associate professor at Moi University and permanent secretary in the Ministries of Education and Local Government
- Olekina Ledama – Founder, Maasai Education Discovery
- Stanley Shapashina Oloitiptip – Former Kenya politician and cabinet minister
- Josephine Lemoyan – social scientist, Tanzanian member of the 2017-2022 East African Legislative Assembly
- Nice Nailantei Lengete – First woman to address the Maasai elders council at Mount Kilimanjaro, and persuaded the council to ban female genital mutilation among the Maasai across Kenya and Tanzania
- Joseph Ole Lenku – Cabinet Secretary of Kenya for Interior and Coordination of National Government from 2012 to 2014
- Mbatian – Prophet after whom Batian Peak, the highest peak of Mount Kenya, is named
- Katoo Ole Metito – Member of Parliament for Kajiado South sub county
- Joseph Nkaissery – Former Cabinet Secretary of Kenya for Interior and Coordination of National Government from 2014 to his death in 2017
- William Ole Ntimama – Former Kenyan politician and leader of the Maa community
- Damaris Parsitau – gender equality advocate, feminist, and scholar
- David Rudisha – Middle-distance runner and 800-meter world record holder
- George Saitoti – former Vice-president of Kenya
- Moses ole Sakuda – Kenyan politician
- Jackson Ole Sapit – Sixth Archbishop and Primate of the Anglican Church of Kenya
- Edward Sokoine – Prime Minister of Tanzania from 1977 to 1980 and again from 1983 to 1984
- Sanaipei Tande – Kenyan musical artist

== See also ==
- Maasai religion
- Maa Civil Society Forum
- 1899 famine in central Kenya
