= Maa Civil Society Forum =

The Maa Civil Society Forum is an association of various NGOs, organisations and individuals formed to promote land rights claims of the Maasai people of Kenya. The group is committed to peaceful means, and intends to achieve its aims through dialogue with the Kenyan and British governments, and through a legal case challenging the legitimacy of the 1904 Anglo-Maasai Treaty.
