= Maasai religion =

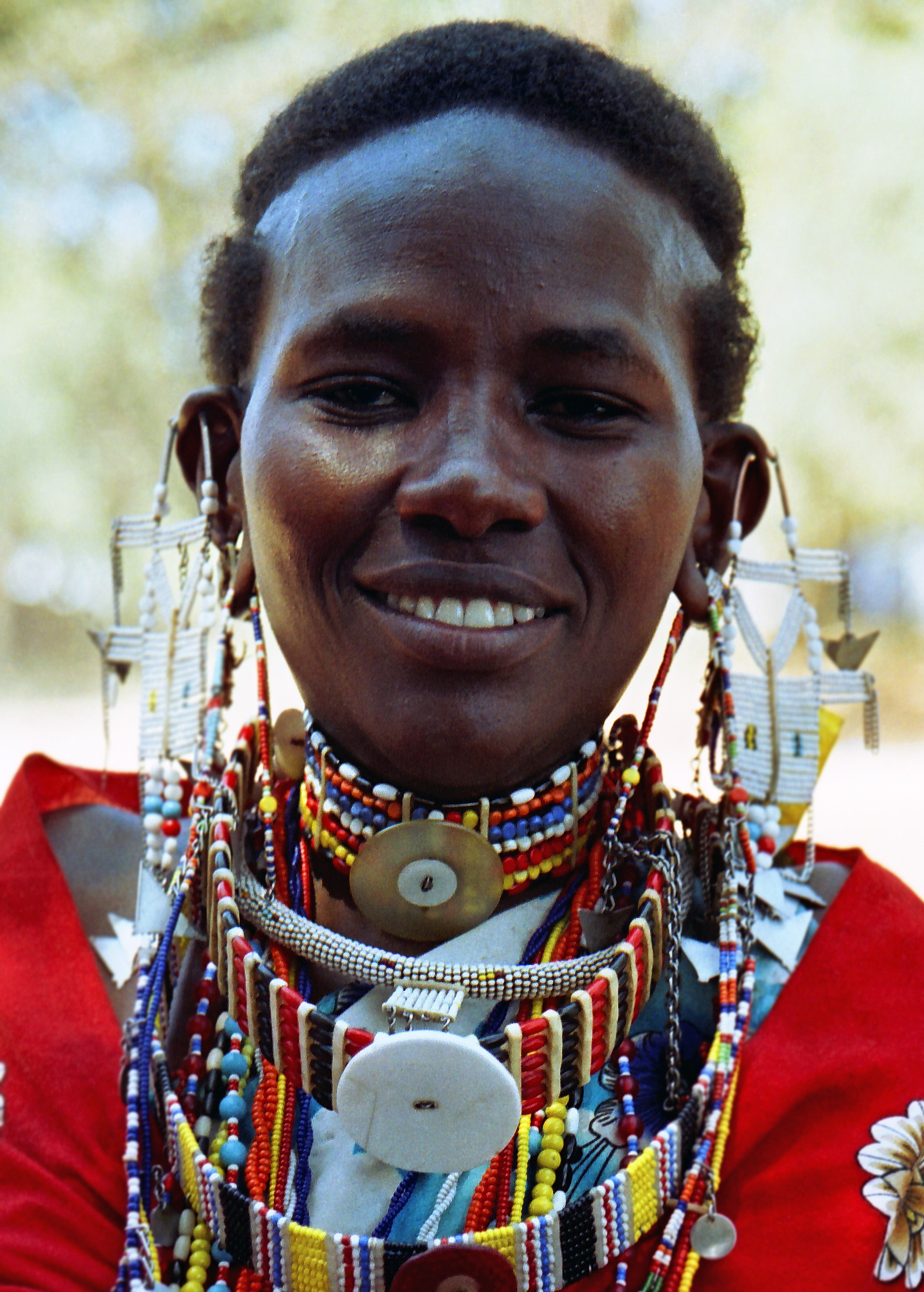

The Maasai people are a semi-nomadic ethnic group living across northern Tanzania and southern Kenya, with a population of over one million today. Religion is woven into their traditional beliefs, relationships with land and livestock.

== Summary ==
Maasai religion is deeply connected to nature, community and daily life. Beliefs about Enkai influence how people understand the environment, while rituals guide important life stages. Through traditions, the Maasai continue to preserve their culture identity and spiritual beliefs.

Today, some Maasai people also practice Christianity or Islam, but most continue to follow traditional beliefs or blend them with either.

== Traditional beliefs & Enkai ==
In Maasai culture, nature and its elements are important facets of their religion.

Ngai (also called Enkai/Engai) is often associated with "rain". The name is sometimes translated as "Rain".

In Maasai religion, the Laibon (plural: Laiboni) intercedes between the world of the living and the Creator. Laiboni serve as high priests and diviners. In addition to organizing and presiding over religious ceremonies, including sacrifice and libation, they also heal the living, physically and spiritually.

The Maasai believe in one God, Engai (Enkai), the Supreme Creator. Engai is described as androgynous, possessing both masculine and feminine principles. Engai is known as the creator of all things: the sky, the earth, people, animals, and cattle.

The Maasai refer to Ngai's primordial dwelling as "Ol Doinyo Lengai" meaning "The Mountain of God", which they believe is in Northern Tanzania.

Maasai Culture speak two manifestations of Enkai: Engai Narok (Black Engai), associated with rain clouds, fertility, and blessing and Engai Na-nyokie (Red Engai) which is associated with drought, hardship, and lightning. These are not two separate gods, but two expressions of one divine power.

A well-known story tells of a time of great famine when people and their cattle were suffering from lack of water. Black Engai, moved with compassion, urged that rain be sent to earth. Red Engai was reluctant, believing people had become careless and spoiled. After much pleading, rain was released, and it fell for many days.

When Red Engai insisted the rain stop, Black Engai argued that the land was still dry and the people still weak. The disagreement continued. In some tellings, thunder is said to be the sound of Red Engai’s anger, while gentler rain is the blessing of Black Engai protecting the people.

The Maasai have often understood events such as storms, rainfall or drought were signs of Enkai's displeasure.

=== Cattle ===
Cattle are central to Maasai life, religion, and culture. The Maasai believed that Enkai gave cattle to them as a sacred gift. Cattle are used in important ceremonies such as marriages, blessings, and many other rituals. They provide food, clothing and materials for shelter. Young male warriors (Moran) care and protect the herds. Women milk the cattle and manage the home. Cattle also are a symbol of wealth, and a way to show respect and build an alliance between families. When a man has multiple wives, he is wealthy and this is measured on the size of a mans herd. In modern times, the Maasai face growing pressure on their cattle based way of life, like land loss and restricted lands.

== Traditional healing ==
Traditional healing is a huge part of Maasai culture, combining knowledge of medicinal plants with spiritual guidance. The Maasai often rely on Olaiboni (Laiboni), who serve as prophets, spiritual leaders, and healers.

=== Life cycle ===
Marriage and blessing ceremonies are very important in Maasai as a way to bring families and communities together. The Maasai practice polygyny, where a man can have more than one wife. This isn't necessarily a personal choice, but a practical system that helps support a family. In blessings, the husband's family usually gives cattle to the bride's family. Men are only allowed to marry after they have completed their warrior stage. The elders give blessings for a strong and healthy marriage. Some brides shave their heads and wear special beadwork. Marriage is seen as a way to follow the wishes of Enkai.

Birth practices are seen as a blessing from Enkai. When the baby is born, families and the community come together and hold a naming ceremony to welcome the child into life. These rituals connect the children to their culture and beliefs.

They also had Death Practices. When someone from Maasai has died, they do not bury them. The body was left in the open. They believed burying these bodies could harm the land. They say "Once an individual has passed, their journey has ended." Maasai culture does not focus on the afterlife. The person's impact continues through the community. Death is more about morality and legacy.

== Women's roles ==
Maasai women play a significant role in society and culture. They manage many daily responsibilities, including preparing meals, fetching water, maintaining the home, milking cattle, caring for livestock, and raising children. Marriage is key part for many women's lives. Maasai women also craft traditional beadwork, and each piece can convey information about age, marital status, social belonging, and cultural values. Through their skills in clothing, decoration, and household management, women help preserve and transmit Maasai identity. They also strengthen community bonds by supporting co-wives and fostering cooperation within family and clan structures. Women teach younger generations about spiritual rituals, symbolism, and cultural values, helping preserve Maasai traditions.

== See also ==
- Mbatian, Maasai Laibon (died 1890)
