= Kore people =

The Kore of Lamu are a small people living on Lamu Island on the northern Kenya coast. In 1985 they numbered between 200 and 250 people (Curtin 1985). Their history before 1870 lies with the other Maa peoples in central Kenya. After being defeated by the Purko Maasai in the 1870s, the Kore fled to north-eastern Kenya where they were taken captive by Somali people. After functioning for years as clients or slaves in Somali households, they were set free by British imperial forces around the end of the 19th century. Loss of cattle brought them to Lamu island in the second half of the 20th century. They have lost their own language, a Maa variety, and speak Somali nowadays. They have adopted many Somali customs.
