= Ngasa people =

Ethnic group in Kilimanjaro Region, Tanzania

Ngasa
Wangasa

Regions with significant populations
- Tanzania: 4,285 (2000)

Languages
- Ngasa & Chaga

Religion
- Unknown

Related ethnic groups
- Maasai & other Nilotic peoples

The Ngasa or Ngas, also known as Ongamo (Wangasa, in Swahili), are an ethnic and linguistic group based on the northeastern slopes of Mount Kilimanjaro in Rombo District, Kilimanjaro Region, Tanzania. In 2000 the Nilotic ethnic Ngasa population was estimated to number 4,285, with only 200 to 300 members continuing to speak the Ngasa language. Speakers have shifted to Chaga, a dominant regional Bantu language.
