= Maa languages =

Language family

Maa
- Geographic distribution: Kenya and northern Tanzania
- Linguistic classification: Nilo-Saharan?: Eastern Sudanic; Southern Eastern; Nilotic; Eastern; Ateker-Lotuko-Maa; Lotuko–Maa; Ongamo-Maa; Maa
- Subdivisions: Samburu; Camus; Maasai

Language codes
- ISO 639-3: –
- Glottolog: onga1238

The Maa languages are a group of closely related Eastern Nilotic languages (or from a linguistic perspective, dialects, as they appear to be mutually intelligible) spoken in parts of Kenya and Tanzania by more than a million speakers. They are subdivided into North and South Maa. The Maa languages are related to the Lotuko languages spoken in South Sudan.

== History ==
In the past, several groups of people have abandoned their languages in favor of a Maa language, usually following a period of intensive cultural and economic contact. Among groups that have assimilated to Maa peoples are the Aasáx (Asa) and the El Molo, former hunter-gatherers who spoke Cushitic languages, and the Mukogodo-Maasai (Yaaku), former bee-keepers and hunter-gatherers (Eastern Cushitic). The Okiek of northern Tanzania, speakers of a Southern Nilotic Kalenjin tongue, are under heavy influence from Maasai.

== Languages ==
- Maa
  - Northern Maa
    - Samburu (spoken by the Samburu people)
    - Camus (or il-Chamus, the preferred autonym; sometimes considered a dialect of Samburu)
  - Southern Maa
    - Maasai (spoken by the Maasai peoples)
    - Ngasa or Ongamo (extinct or at least endangered; most speakers have shifted to Chaga) (Sommer 1992:380)

A Maa dialect is also spoken by the Baraguyu people of Central Tanzania, in an area known as the Makata Swamp near Morogoro, TZ. Another Kenyan Maa variety once existed, Kore. After being defeated by the Purko Maasai in the 1870s, the Kore fled to north-eastern Kenya where they were taken captive by Somali people. After functioning for years as clients or slaves in Somali households, they were set free by British imperial forces around the end of the 19th century. They have lost their own language and speak Somali. Loss of cattle brought them to Lamu island in the second half of the 20th century, where they live nowadays.

== Reconstruction ==
Proto-Ongamo-Maa has been reconstructed by Vossen & Rottland (1989).
