= Samburu language =

Dialect of the Maa language

Samburu
- Sampur, ɔl Maa
- Native to: Kenya
- Region: Samburu district of Rift Valley Province
- Ethnicity: Samburu
- Native speakers: 240,000 (2009 census) (including Camus)
- Language family: Nilo-Saharan?: Eastern Sudanic; Nilotic; Eastern Nilotic; Ateker-Lotuko-Maa; Lotuko–Maa; Ongamo–Maa; Samburu
- Dialects: Camus

Language codes
- ISO 639-3: saq
- Glottolog: samb1315

Samburu is a Maa language dialect spoken by Samburu pastoralists in northern Kenya. The Samburu number about 128,000 (or 147,000 including the Camus/Chamus). The Samburu dialect is closely related to the Camus dialect (88% to 94% lexical similarity) and to the South Maasai dialects (77% to 89% lexical similarity). The word "Samburu" itself may derive from the Maa word saamburr for a leather bag the Samburu use.

== Phonology ==
Consonant phonemes
		Labial	Alveolar	Palatal	Velar	Glottal
Explosives		/b/	/t/	/c/	/k/	/ʔ/
Implosives		/ɓ/	/ɗ/	/ʄ/	/ɠ/	
Nasals		/m/	/n/			
Fricatives			/s/			/h/
Laterals			/l/			
Flaps			/ɾ/			
Trills			/r/			
Semivowels	Weak	/w/		/j/		
Semivowels	Strong	/wː/		/jː/		
