= Stanley Shapashina Oloitiptip =

Kenyan politician (1924–1985)

Stanley Shapashina Oloitiptip (1924–1985) was a Kenyan politician and cabinet minister. He was born in Endoinyo Oontawua in southern Kenya. He was the son on Naseramporro and Olong’oyana Oloitiptip and a member of the Ilaitayiok Maasai clan.

In 1963, Oloitiptip was elected to Kenya's first parliament, representing Kajiado South as a member of the Kenya African Democratic Union (KADU) party ticket. He continued to serve in the Kenya Parliament of the next 23 years.

In 1984, Oloitiptip was jailed for 12 months for tax evasion. He subsequently lost his parliamentary seat. Oloitiptip retired from public life, and died on 22 January 1985, aged 61.
