= Ilchamus people =

Ethnic group in Kenya

The Ilchamus (sometimes spelled Iltiamus, also known as Njemps), are a Maa-speaking people living south and southeast of Lake Baringo, Kenya. They numbered approximately 32,949 people in 2019 and are closely related to the Samburu living more to the north-east in the Rift Valley Province. They are one of the smallest ethnic groups in Kenya.

In their oral traditions, the Ilchamus economy underwent a succession of elaborations: from foraging and fishing to a sophisticated system of irrigation, and then this was mixed with pastoralism under the influence of Samburu immigrants and neighbouring Maasai. These changes involved a series of embellishments in their culture and social organization. However, this evolving system did not survive the challenges of the capitalist economy in post-colonial Kenya, leading to a more polarized society with diminishing prospects for the majority of Ilchamus.

Ilchamus arrived in earlier than all other residents of Baringo South around the shores of mparingo. Which later scholars from Germany who first colonized one Ilchamus Lekeper manyatta registered the mparingo "Lake Baringo" due to pronunciation error. So Baringo county is from the Root word mparingo. On arrival ilchamus occupied areas around mparingo. "Lake Baringo". Cradle land is Laikipia which was the dispersal area after then mass movement of the maasai under Lenana the "Loibon" ...lhoiboni. Ilchamus is one of the sub-dialectical groups found among the maa speaking communities of Kenya and Tanzania in East Africa. Other dialectical groups are Ilpurko, Lkieek onyokie, Lkaputei, Lmatapalo, Lkisonko, Larusa of Tanzania, Sambur of maralal, Lmomonyot and Ldikirri of Laikipia. On arrival on the shores of mparingo "Lake Baringo", Ilchamus settled around doing fishing activity and anting only to spread out latter to their respective manyattas of melwat and wasu Nanyokie Ilchamus le keper. "Sokon" the only original true iIlchamus dialectical group is ILKEROI; these are few families which have attached themselves to the following hosts: Saaya, Sauroki, Chamakany, Mpakany, Naremo and Kikenyi. The rest of Ilkeroi fled to become Sabaot or Elgon Maasai around mt. Elgon through kapchomus near Osen highland of Baringo.

== Language ==
Camus
- il-Chamus
- Native to: Kenya
- Region: Lake Baringo
- Language family: Nilo-Saharan?: Eastern Sudanic; Nilotic; Eastern Nilotic; Ateker-Lotuko-Maa; Lotuko–Maa; Maa; Samburu; Camus

Language codes
- ISO 639-3: –
- Glottolog: cham1311

Camus or Chamus (autonym: il-Chamus) is classified under the Maa languages in the Eastern Nilotic language branch. It is closely related to the Samburu language (between 89% and 94% lexical similarity), to the point of being considered a Samburu dialect by some. Together, Samburu and il-Chamus form the northern division of the Maa languages.

== See also ==
- Kamba
- Meru
