= List of museums in Kenya =

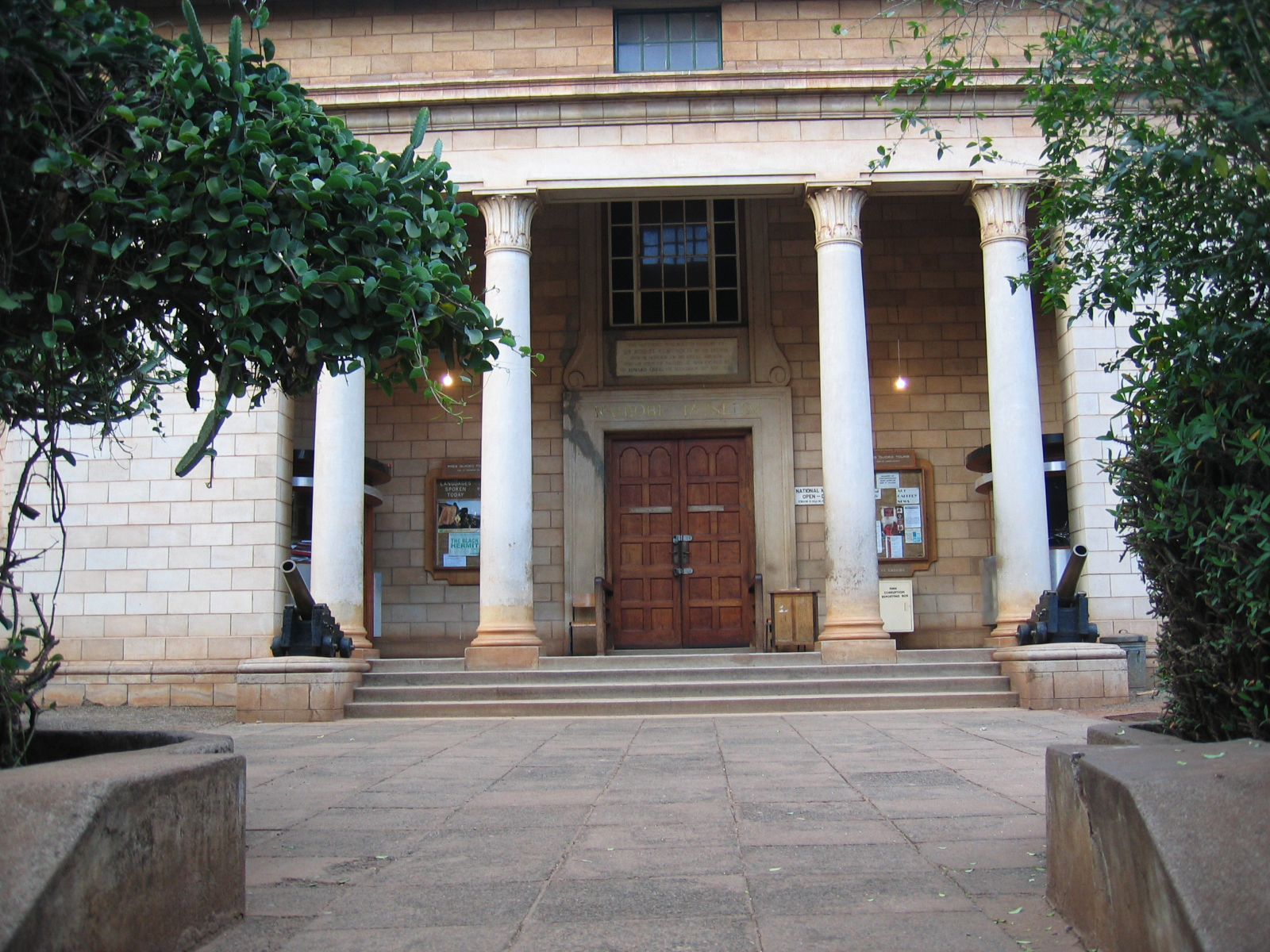
The entrance to Nairobi Museum

This is a list of museums in Kenya. Many of these national and provincial museums are administered by the National Museums of Kenya (NMK).

== Museums ==
- Abasuba Community Peace Museum, Mfangano Island.
- Aembu Community Peace Museum, near Embu.
- African Heritage Pan African Gallery, Nairobi.
- African Heritage House, Mlolongo Machakos county
- August 7th Memorial Park, Nairobi.
- Akamba Community Peace Museum, near Machakos.
- Bomas of Kenya
- Community Museums of Kenya
- Fort Jesus Museum, Mombasa
- Garissa Museum
- Gede National Monument
- Hyrax Hill Site Museum
- Jumba la Mtwana
- Kabarnet Museum
- Kapenguria Museum
- Karen Blixen Museum, near Nairobi
- Kariandusi Pre-Historic Site Museums
- Kenya National Archives, Nairobi.
- Kenyatta House
- Kisumu Museum
- Kitale Museum
- Koobi Fora Pre-Historic Site
- Krapf Memorial Museum
- Lamu Museum
- Lari Memorial Peace Museum, Kiambu District.
- Loiyangalani Desert Museum
- Malindi Museum
- Meru Museum
- Mnarani Ruins
- Nairobi Botanic Garden, Nairobi
- Nairobi Gallery, Nairobi.
- Nairobi National Museum, Nairobi
- Nairobi Railway Museum, Nairobi
- Nairobi Snake Park, Nairobi
- Narok Museum
- Nyeri Museum
- Olorgesailie Pre-Historic Site, Olorgesailie.
- Porini Association
- Rabai Museum
- Seu-Seu Community Peace Museum.
- Siyu Fort
- Takwa Ruins
- Tambach Museum
- Thimlich Ohinga
- Treasures of Africa Museum
- Wajir Museum
- Wray Memorial Museum

== See also ==
- Sites and monuments in Kenya
- List of museums
