= Fly-SAX Flight 102 =

2018 aviation accident in Kenya

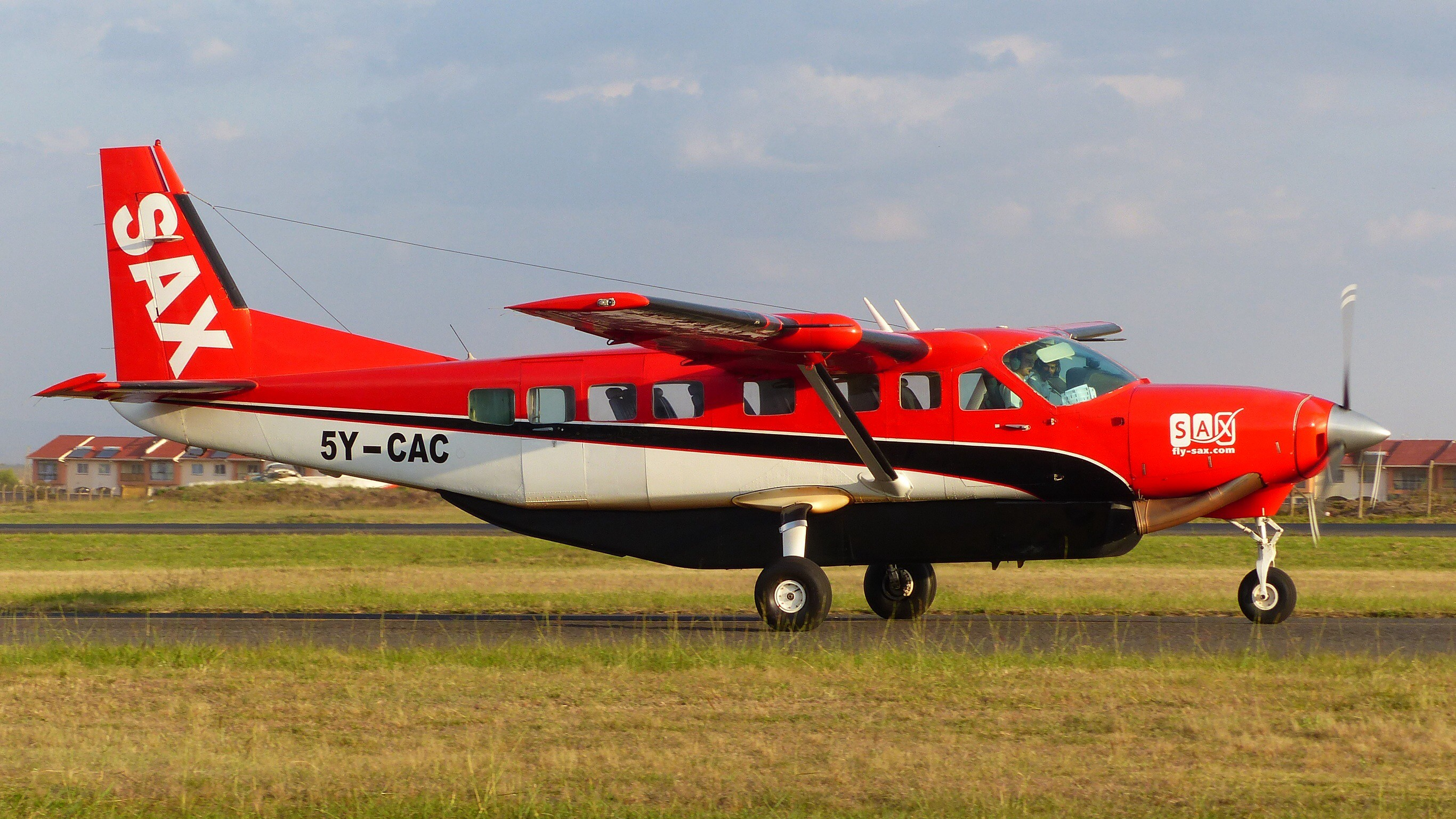
- 5Y-CAC, the aircraft involved in the accident, seen in 2014

Accident
- Date: June 5, 2018
- Summary: Controlled flight into terrain, caused by pilot and ATC error
- Site: Elephant Hill (part of the Aberdare Range), Kenya; 0°36′45.7″S 36°42′40.2″E

Aircraft
- Aircraft type: Cessna 208B Grand Caravan
- Operator: Fly-SAX
- IATA flight No.: B5102
- ICAO flight No.: EXZ102
- Call sign: TWIGA 102
- Registration: 5Y-CAC
- Flight origin: Kitale Airport, Kitale, Kenya
- Destination: Jomo Kenyatta International Airport, Nairobi, Kenya
- Occupants: 10
- Passengers: 8
- Crew: 2
- Fatalities: 10
- Survivors: 0

On 5 June 2018, Fly-SAX Flight 102, a Cessna 208B Grand Caravan operating a domestic flight in Kenya between Kitale Airport and Jomo Kenyatta International Airport, Nairobi, crashed into Elephant Hill, a peak in the Aberdare Mountains, killing all 10 people on board. The investigation ruled that the crash was a case of controlled flight into terrain, caused by the crew's decision of flying instrument flight rules at an altitude below the minimum one for that region.

== Background ==
=== Aircraft ===
The aircraft involved was a Cessna 208B Grand Caravan, registered as 5Y-CAC. The aircraft was equipped with a terrain awareness and warning system, which should alert the pilots, with an advance of 60 seconds, of an imminent collision.

=== Passengers and crew ===
The pilot in command was 30 years old Barbara Wangeci Kamau, she joined Fly-SAX in 2017 and had a total of 2450 flight hours, of which approximately 1200 were on the Cessna Caravan. The first officer was 26 years old Jean Mureithi, she had a total of 2396 flight hours, of which 1200 on this aircraft type. On board there were eight passengers.

== Accident ==
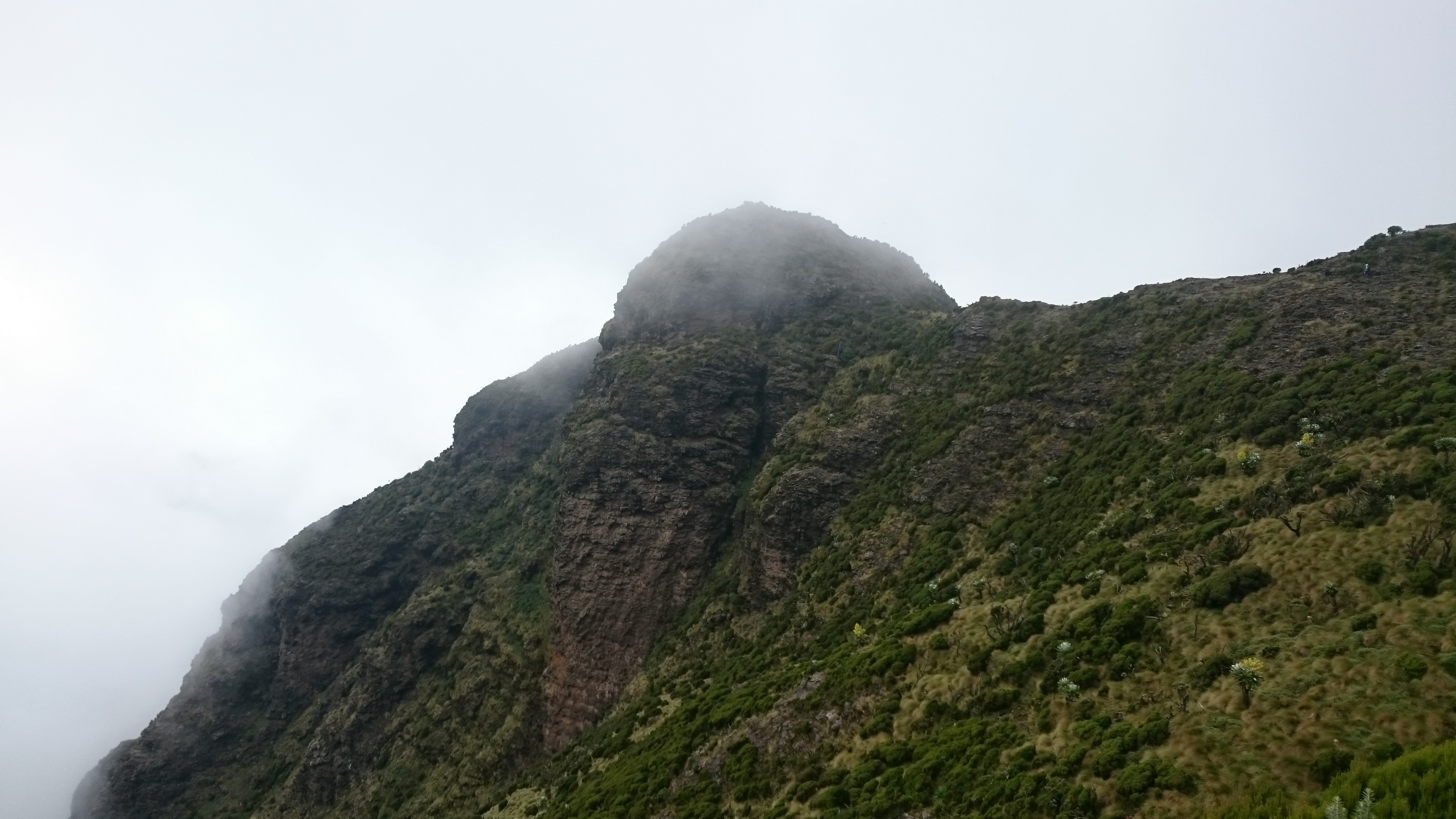
A view of Elephant Hill, where the crash occurred

The aircraft took off at 4:05 pm local time from Kitale Airport for its flight to Jomo Kenyatta International Airport, where it was scheduled to land on runway 24. After take off the aircraft climbed to flight level FL110, and maintained that altitude. The crew continued the flight flying instrument flight rules (IFR), even though the minimum altitude for flying IFR in the area was flight level FL150. The aircraft then reached the Aberdare Range, whose highest peaks exceeded the crusing altitude of the aircraft, and shortly after, at 5:02 pm local time, contact with Flight 102 was lost. The aircraft impacted Elephant Hill at an altitude of 3645 m, 11 meters below the top of the mountain, in an area covered by bamboo, and at a speed of 288 km/h. All 10 people on board were killed on impact and the aircraft was destroyed. Due to the remoteness of the area and bad weather, rescue teams reached the crash site and discovered the plane's wreckage two days after the crash. The search was initially halted on the evening of 6 June, just to be restarted on the next morning. Aerial and ground search teams were deployed. During search operations a vehicle of the Kenyan Red Cross had an accident, which injured 11 people, of which three seriously.

== Aftermath ==
The bodies of the 10 victims were taken to Nairobi to be identified by their relatives, and to let doctors conduct autopsies. Both the minister of transport, Paul Maringa, and the kenyan president, Uhuru Kenyatta, sent their condolences to the families of the victims of the crash. Fly-SAX's chairman, Charles Wako, also acknowledged the crash during a briefing with the families of the passengers and crew.

== Investigation ==
The final report on the accident, released by the Kenyan Ministry of Transport in 2019, ruled the crash as a controlled flight into terrain (CFIT), caused by errors made by the crew which decided to continue flying instrument flight rules at an altitude below the minimum one of the area to fly IFR. Data collected by the investigators showed that the aircraft's terrain awareness and warning system started to send alerts in the cockpit six seconds before the data stopped recording, and that the aircraft impacted terrain after another minute, giving the pilots enough time to react and avoid colliding with terrain. The investigation found out that also the airline's poor crew resource management played an important role in the accident, and adding this to the fact that both pilots were not sufficiently trained regarding CFIT situations, caused the crew to not react in time to avoid the danger. Errors were also made by the air traffic control. In fact air traffic controllers at Eldoret International Airport, with whom the crew of Flight 102 was in contact, were used to let planes fly under the minimum safe altitude for the area, like in this case. Also the controller operating that day had a lack of situational awareness about the position of Flight 102.
