= National Museums of Kenya =

Kenyan state corporation

National Museums of Kenya (NMK)
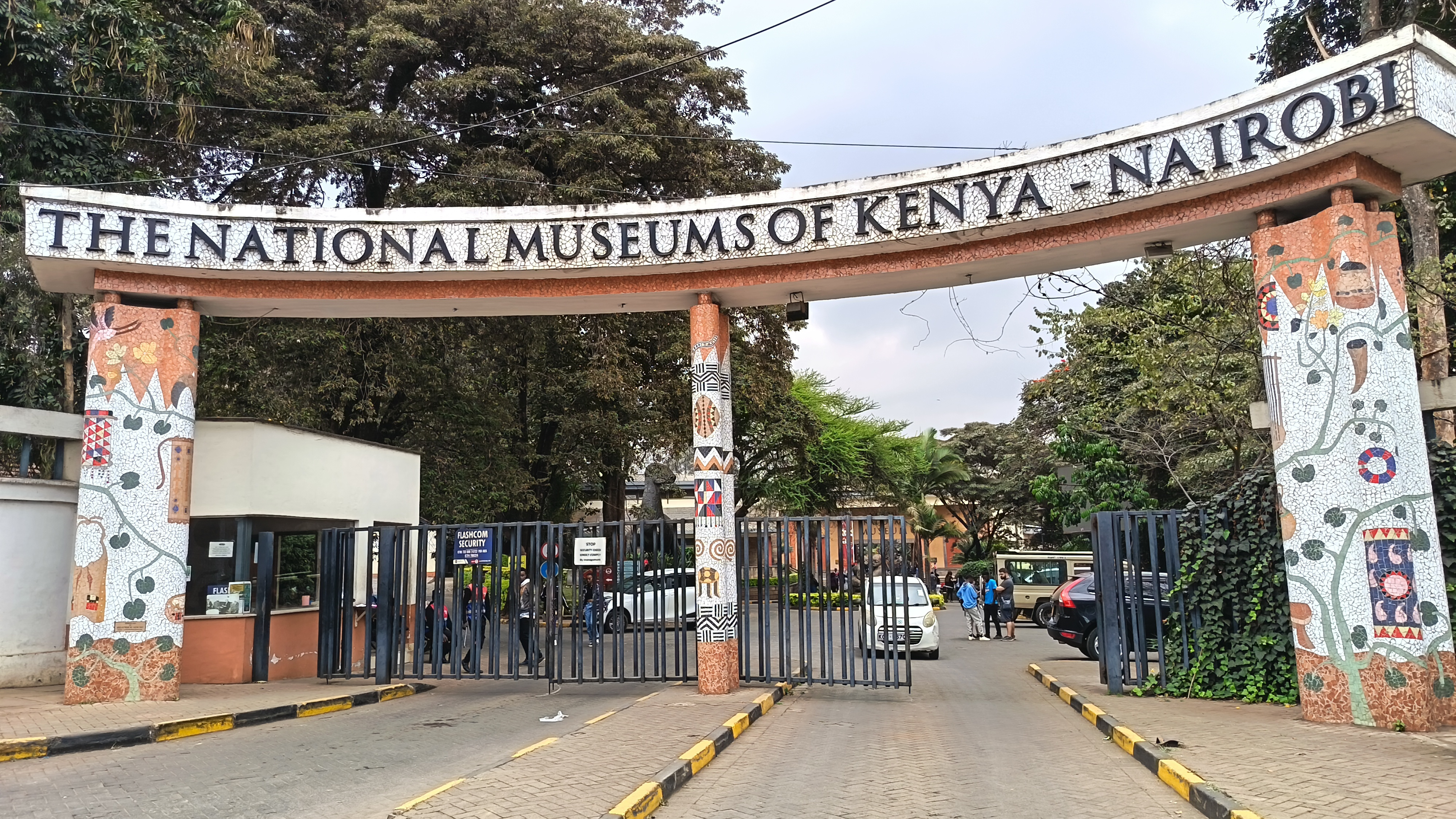
- Museum Main Entrance
- Established: 1911
- Location: Museum Hill, near Uhuru Highway between Central Business District and Westlands, Nairobi, Kenya
- Coordinates: 1°16′12″S 36°48′54″E
- Type: National museum
- Website: www.museums.or.ke

Nairobi National Museum New entrance

The National Museums of Kenya (NMK; Swahili: Makumbusho ya Kitaifa ya Kenya) is a state corporation that manages museums, sites and monuments in Kenya. It carries out heritage research, and has expertise in subjects ranging from palaeontology, archaeology, ethnography and biodiversity research and conservation. Its headquarters and the National Museum (Nairobi National Museum) are located on Museum Hill, near Uhuru Highway between Central Business District and Westlands in Nairobi. The National Museum of Kenya was founded by the East African Natural History Society (E.A.N.H.S.) in 1910; the society's main goal has always been to conduct an ongoing critical scientific examination of the natural attributes of the East African habitat. The museum houses collections, and temporary and permanent exhibits. Today the National Museum of Kenya manages over 22 regional museums, many sites, and monuments across the country.

== Nairobi National Museum of Kenya ==
=== Natural History Museum of Kenya ===
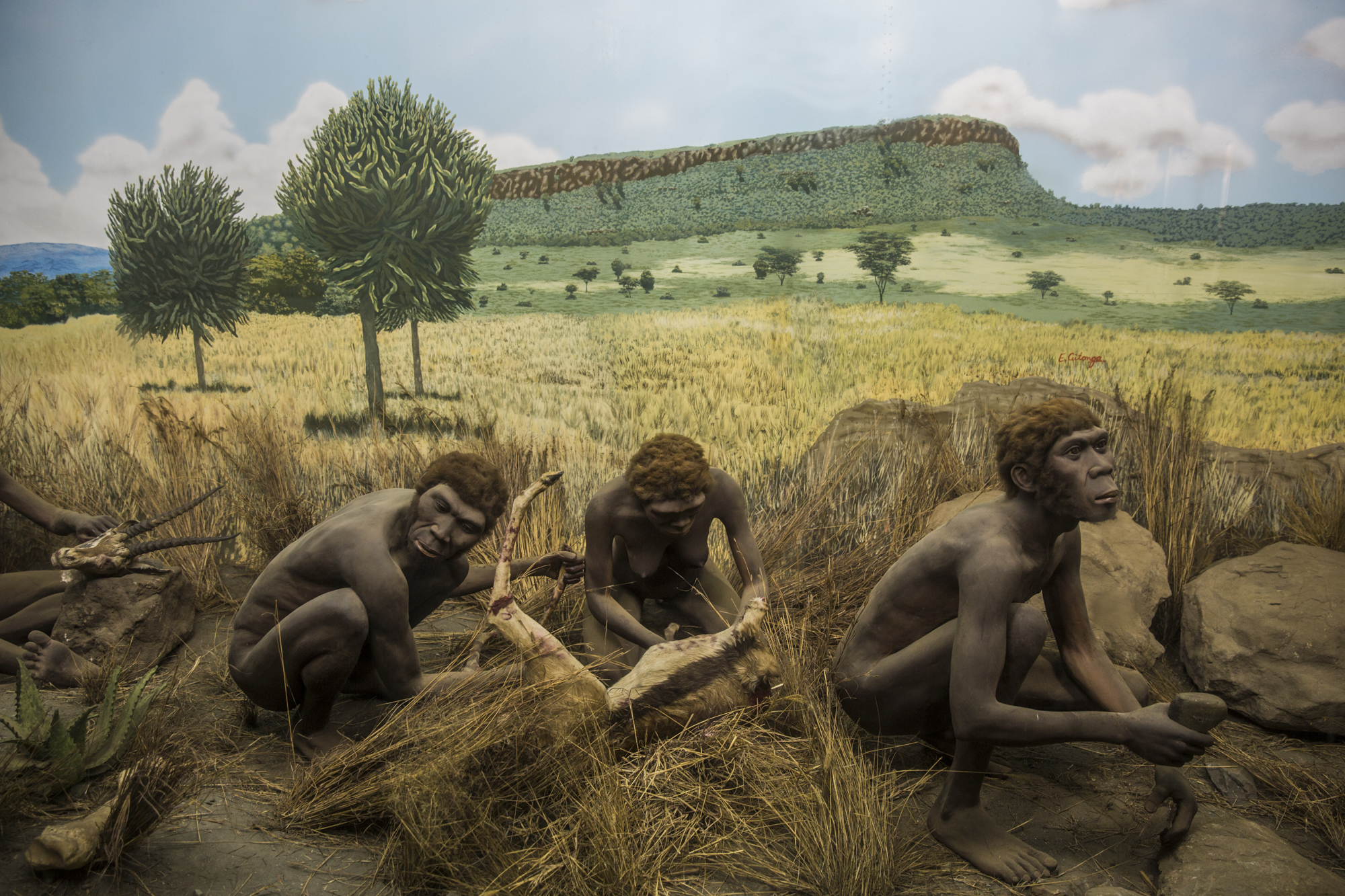
Prehistory

The East Africa and Uganda Natural History Society was founded in 1910–11 by persons with an interest in nature in British East Africa. The group included two canons of the Church Missionary Society: The Rev. Harry Leakey (father of Louis Leakey) and The Rev. Kenneth St. Aubyn Rogers; some government officials: C. W. Hobley and John Ainsworth, doctors, dentists, big-game hunters and plantation owners. In 1911 they established the Natural History Museum and library with an honorary curator. Aladina Visram put up the money for a one-story, two-room building.

In 1914 they could afford a paid curator. They brought in Arthur Loveridge, a herpetologist, who arrived in March 1914. Loveridge concentrated on collections, with the members volunteering to contribute specimens, labour and funds. They also ran the museum while Loveridge fought for the British in German East Africa. He returned for a brief stay after the war, only to go to America, where he eventually became a Harvard University professor.

=== Coryndon Museum ===
The next curator was A. F. J. Gedye. The museum moved to a new building at the corner of Government Road and Kirk Road. Among the new volunteers for the society were Sir Robert Coryndon, Governor of Kenya. At his unexpected death in 1925, Lady Coryndon established the Coryndon Memorial Fund to build a better museum for the society in memory of her husband. The government offered matching funds for public donations and in 1928 construction began.

The building was ready in 1929. Unfortunately no workrooms or storage space had been provided and therefore the Natural History Society declined to move in. The government then bought the old museum and the society used the money to add three rooms, gave its collections to the museum trustees, but retained the library. Everything was moved to the museum. Lady Coryndon donated Sir Robert's books to it.

The museum was officially opened on 22 September 1930, as Coryndon Museum, with Victor Gurney Logan Van Someren, a member, as curator. He was given a house on the grounds. In 1930 Evelyn Molony, née Napier was appointed the museum's first botanist after a grant was given to the museum by Ernest Carr to fund her employment. During her tenure she established within the museum a herbarium on East African plants as well as publishing a series of scientific papers on East African flora.

The relationship between the museum trustees and the society became problematic, and as a result the two organisations appointed a committee including Sir Charles Belcher, a Kenyan jurist, to stabilise it. The committee turned everything over to the museum except for the library in exchange for annual payments for 15 years to the society.

The museum now had a staff. Mary Leakey became part of it and then Louis Leakey, as unpaid curator, in 1941. He stepped in when Dr. van Someren resigned after the board (including Louis) refused to dismiss Peter Bally in a personality conflict. The museum was a center for Leakey operations. In 1945 Louis was hired as paid curator with a new house, as the old one had become run-down. He built up the exhibitions and opened them to Africans and Asians by lowering the admission fee. Until then the museum had been "for whites only."

The museum was a base for Leakey operations until 1961, when Louis founded the Centre for Prehistory and Paleontology on the grounds nearby and moved himself and his collections to it. He resigned in favour of the next director, Robert Carcasson.

=== National Museum ===
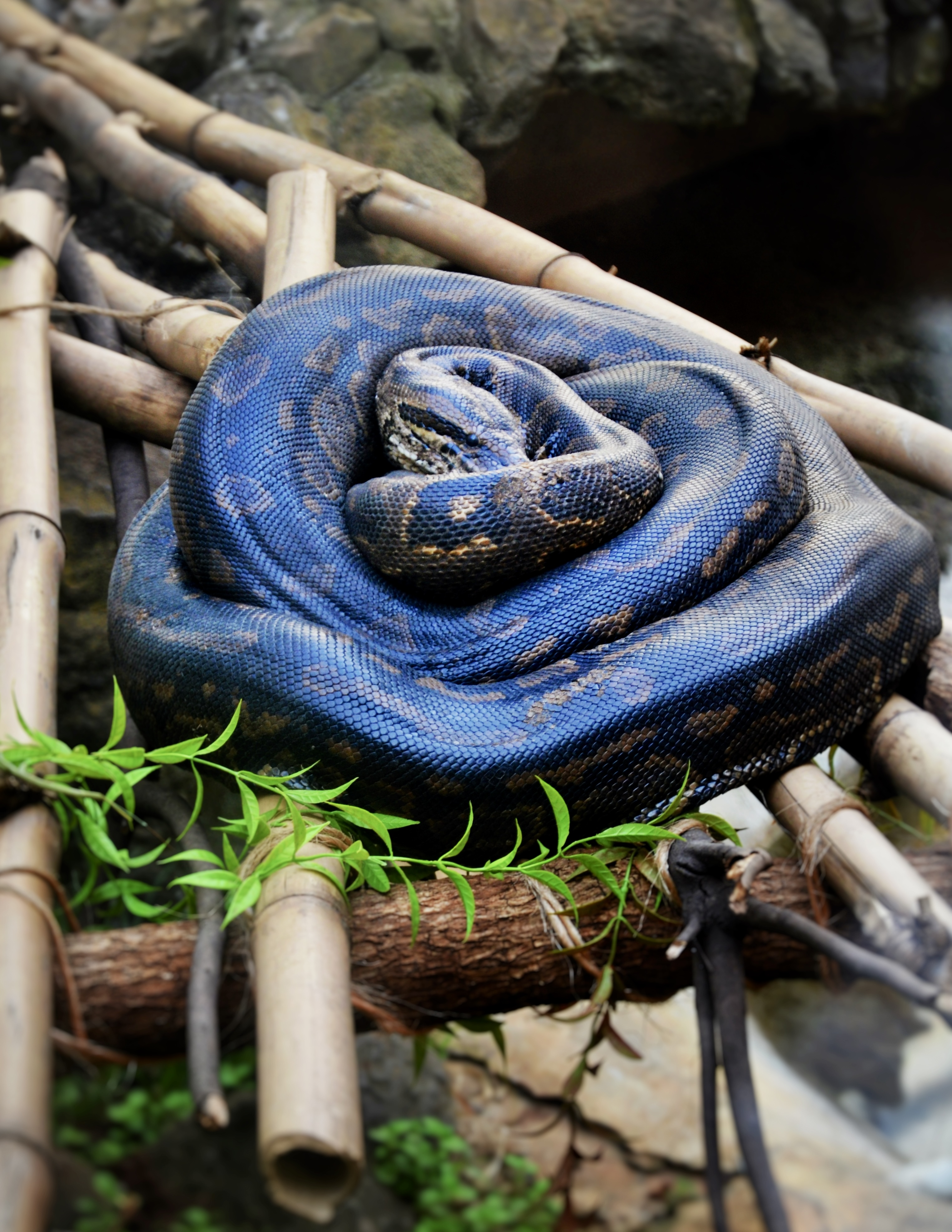
Python at Nairobi Snake Park and Aquarium, Nairobi National Museum

Kenya became independent in 1963. The Coryndon Museum was renamed "National Museum" in 1964 and was included in a new system, the "National Museums of Kenya." In 1967 Richard Leakey was having irreconcilable differences with Louis Leakey, his employer in the centre, and decided to improve the National Museum. His main objection was that it had not been Kenyanized. He and supporters formed the Kenya Museum Associates, which obtained an observer's seat for Richard on the board from Carcasson in exchange for a 5000-pound contribution. Richard did not do much observing, as he departed for the first Omo expedition.

The Kenya Museum Associates included Joel Ojal, the museum overseer in the government. On his return from Omo Richard gave his ideas for improvement directly to Joel, who asked the chairman, Sir Ferdinand Cavendish-Bentinck, to place Richard in a senior position and begin replacing the board with Kenyans of Kenyan extraction, as there were only two out of 16 in that category. The penalty for inaction would be removal of government funding.

Richard was at first offered a part-time executive position, which he turned down. Over the next few months much of the board was replaced and in May 1968 the new board offered Richard a permanent post as administrative director, with Carcasson to be retained as scientific director. However, Carcasson resigned and Richard became director.

=== Gallery of Kenyan Ethnic Communities ===
This gallery contains artwork by Joy Adamson featuring various Kenyan communities in traditional attire.

=== Modern events and facilities ===
On 15 October 2005 Nairobi Museum Galleries closed until December 2007 for an extensive rebuilding program. This was the first major renovation of Nairobi Museum since 1930. A new administration block and commercial center were built, and NMK's physical planning was improved.

The museum re-opened in June 2008. It houses both temporary and permanent exhibitions.

Within the grounds are also the Nairobi Snake Park and the Botanic Garden and nature trail. The museum's commercial wing has restaurants and shops.

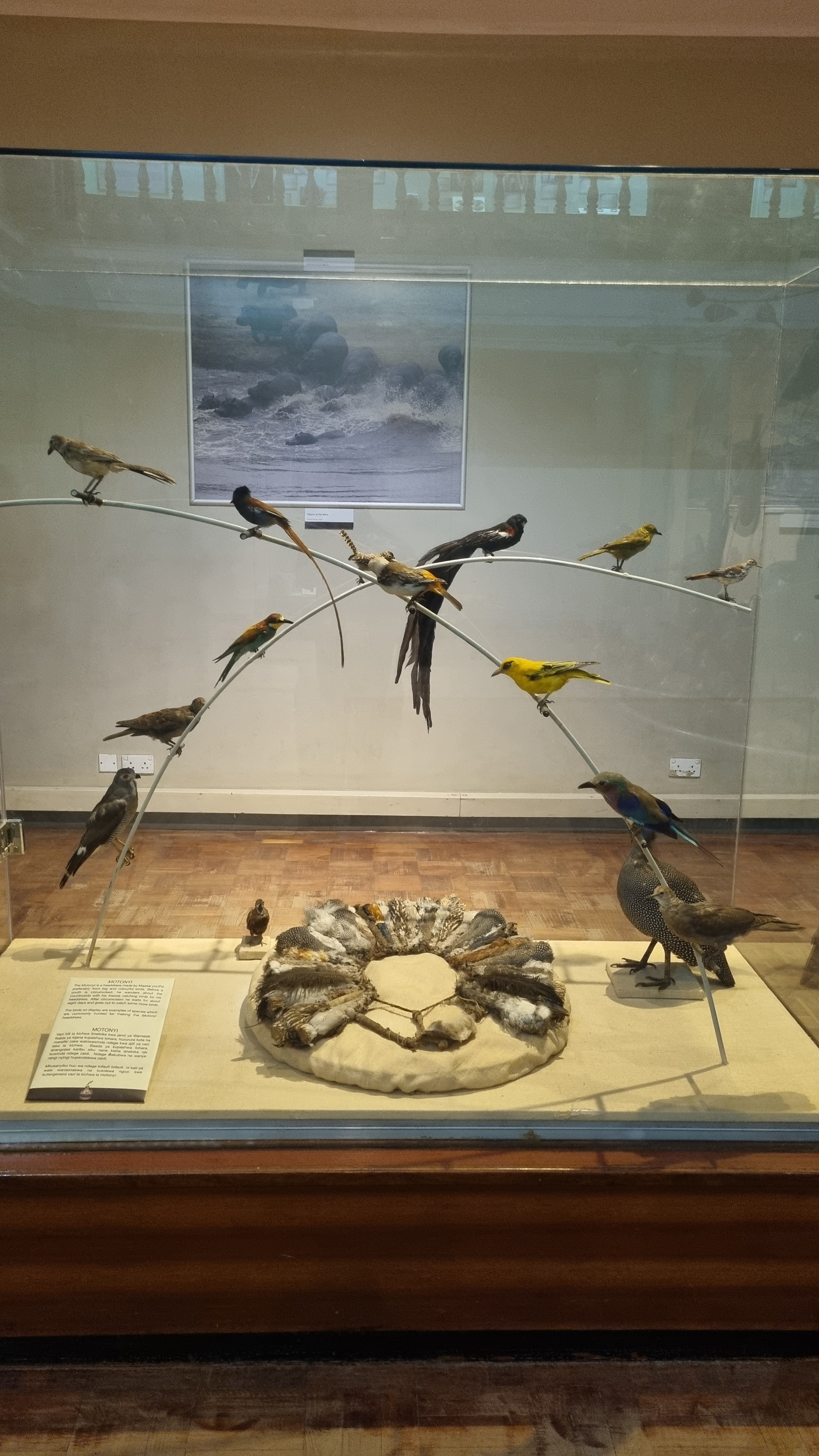
Bird taxidermy in Nairobi National Museum

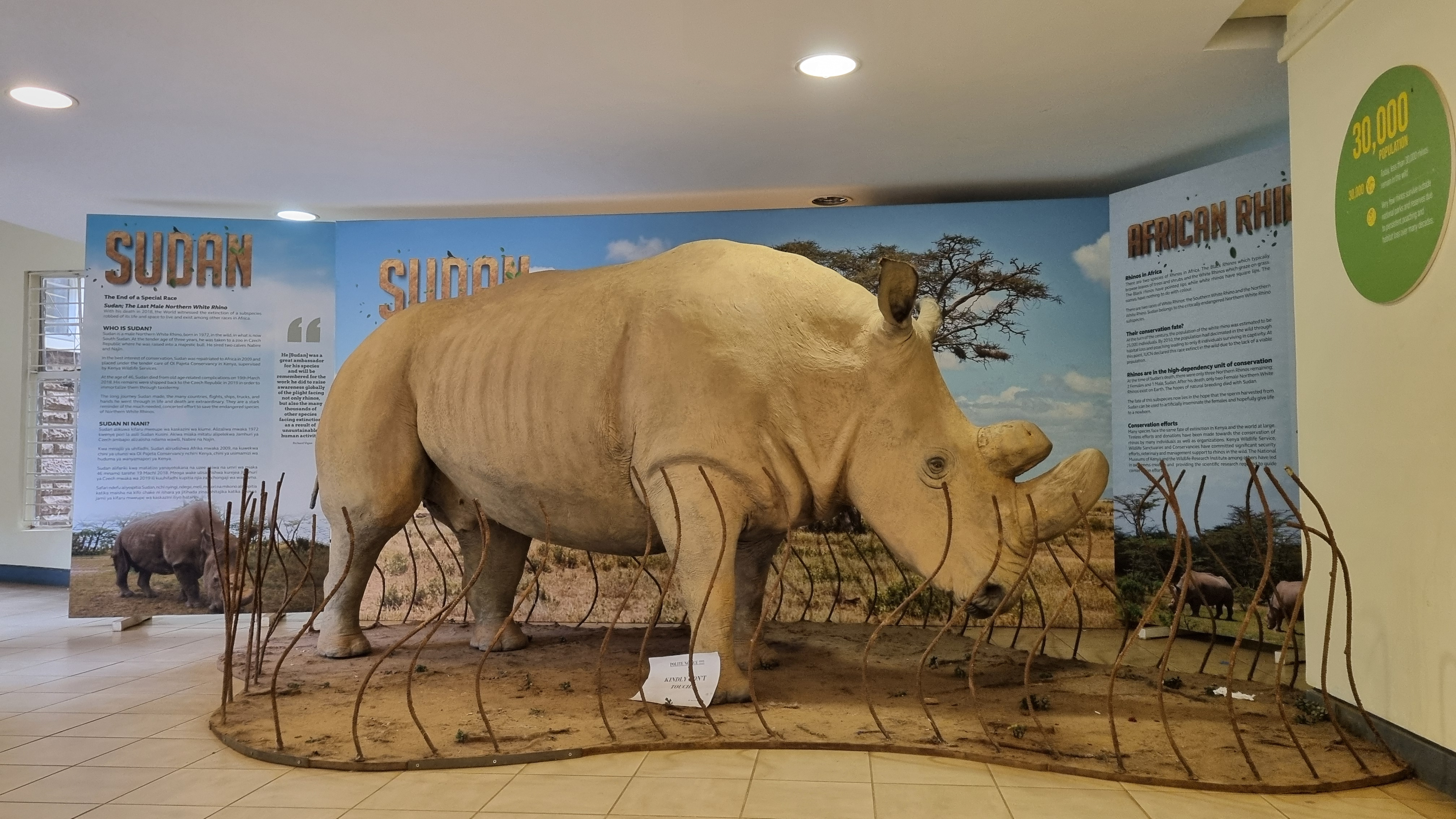
African Rhino taxidermy in Nairobi National Museum

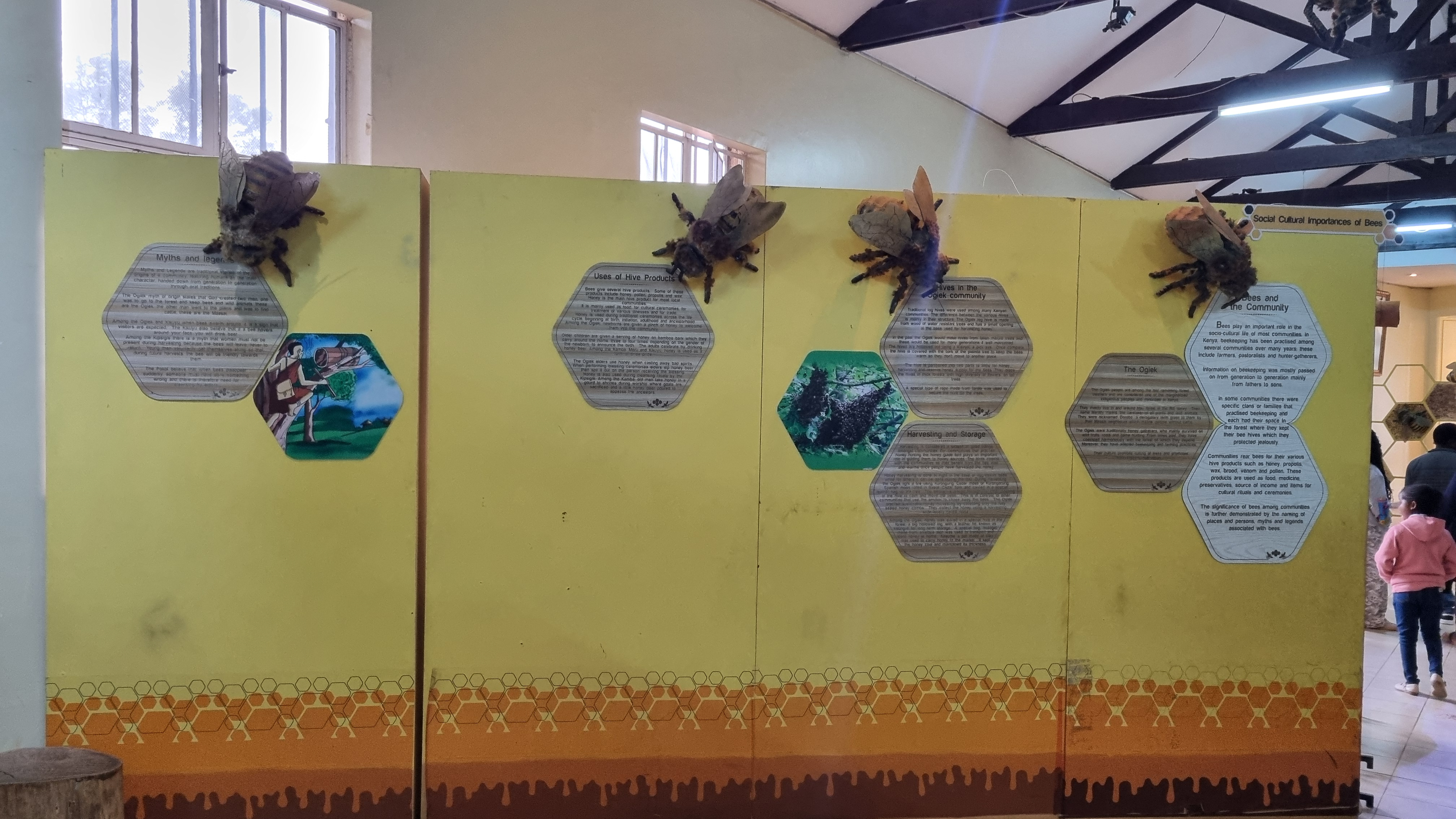
Bee Section in Nairobi National Museum

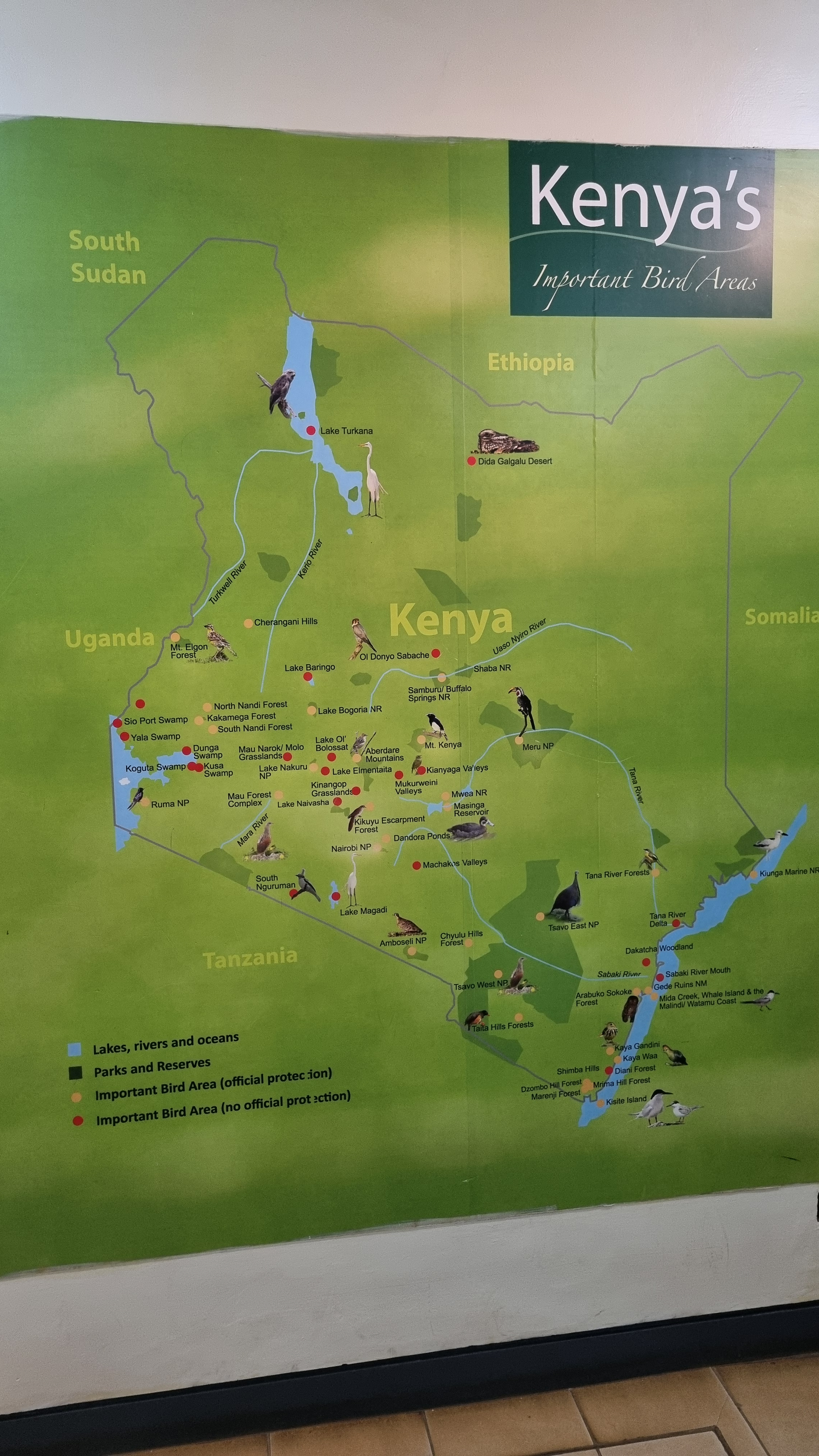
Bird Maps in Nairobi National Museum

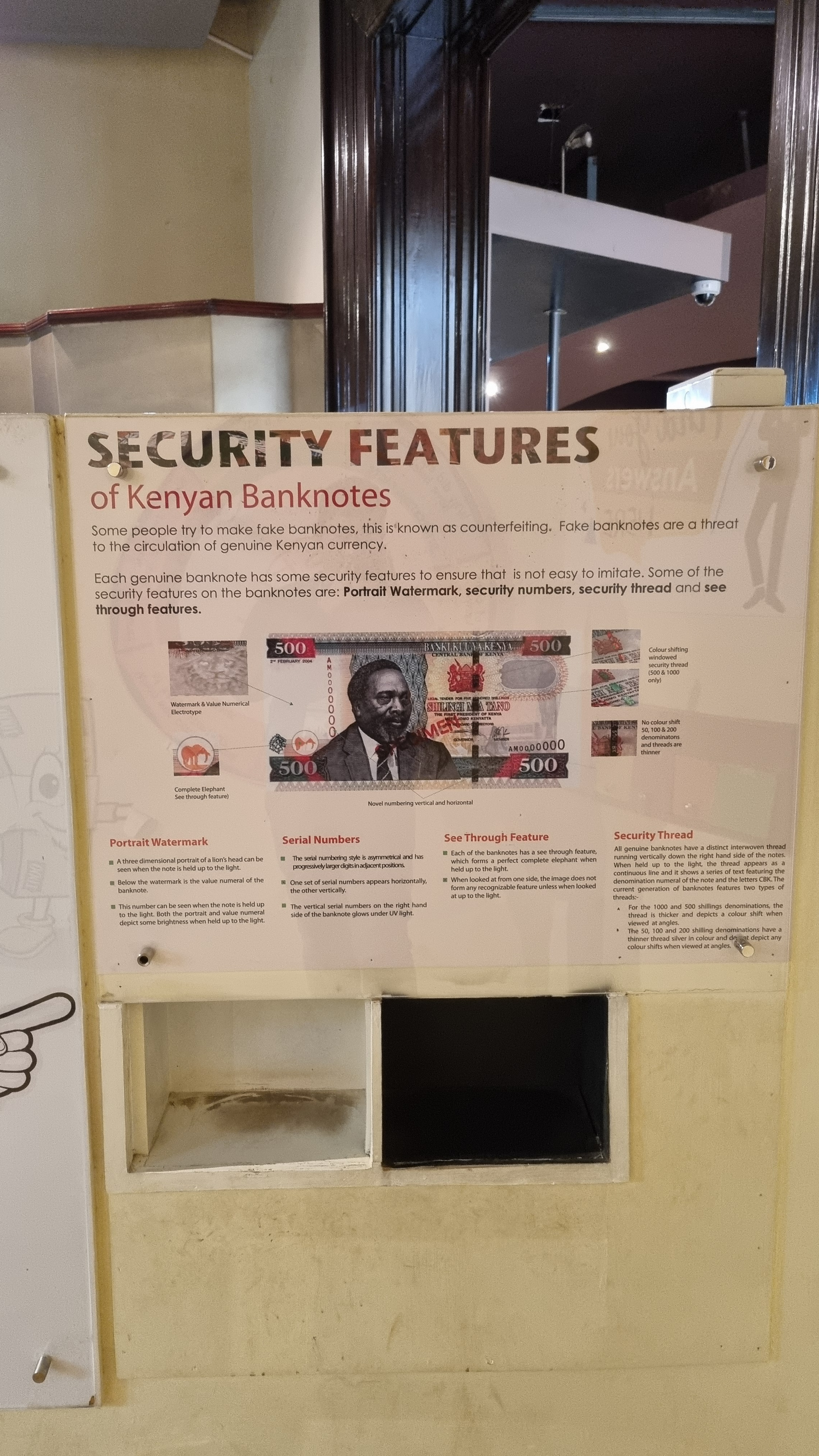
Kenya Shilling Security Features in Nairobi National Museum

== Notable people ==
- Freda Nkirote, former Head of Cultural Heritage.
- Lydia Gatundu Galavu, curator of contemporary art.

== Other museums ==
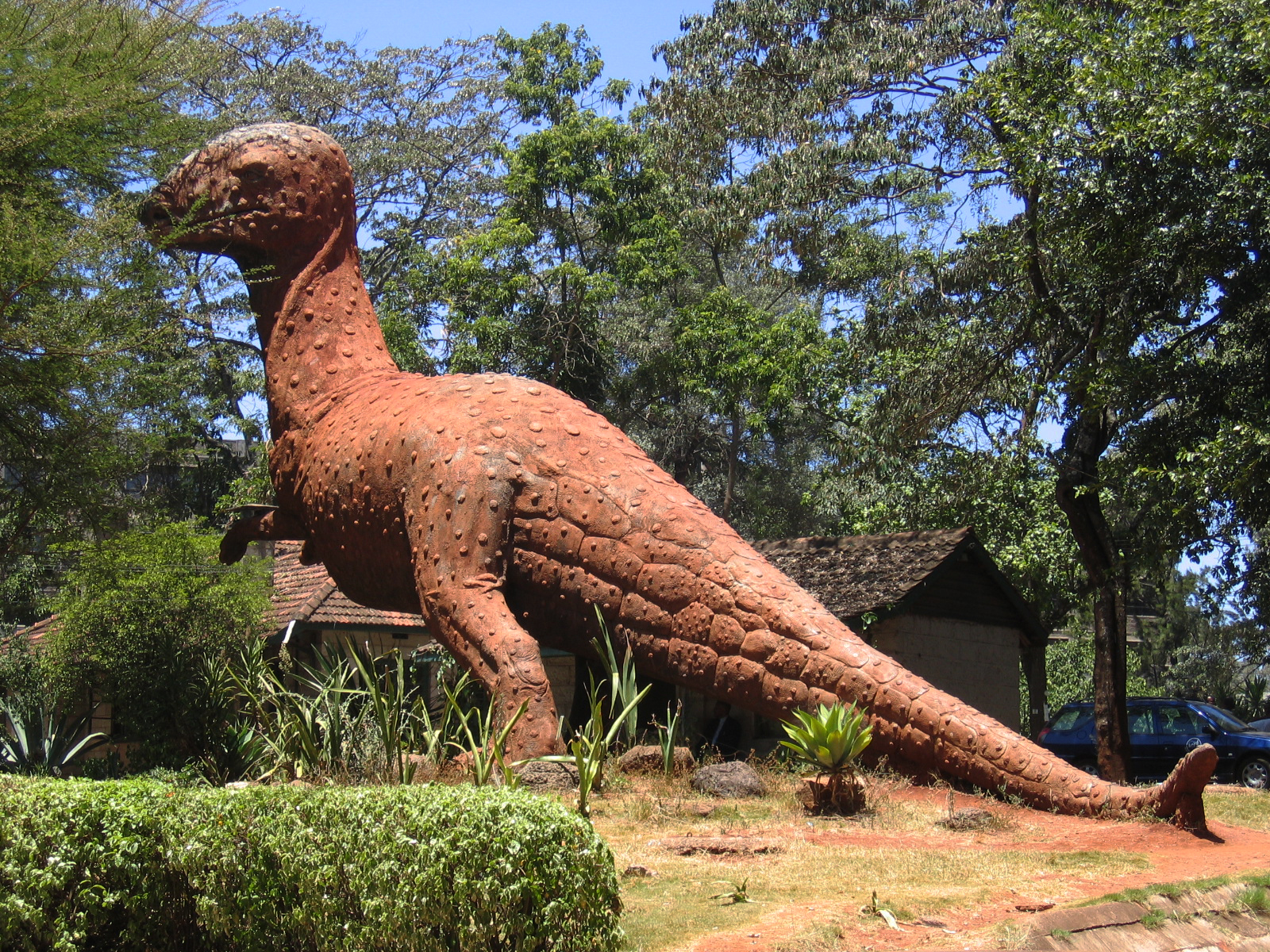
Dinosaur Statue outside the main Museum building.

Other museums, sites and monuments operated by the NMK, including eco-tourist attractions are:

- Nairobi Gallery, Nairobi
- Uhuru Gardens, Nairobi
- Institute of Primate Research, Nairobi
- Fort Jesus, Mombasa
- Gedi ruins, Gedi, near Malindi
- Hyrax Hill Prehistoric site and Museum, near Nakuru
- Jumba la Mtwana, Mtwapa, near Mombasa
- Kabarnet Museum, Kabarnet
- Kakapel Rockshelter, Mt. Elgon
- Karen Blixen Museum, Nairobi
- Kapenguria Museum, Kapenguria
- Kariandusi Museum, near Gilgil
- Kisumu Museum, Kisumu
- Kitale Museum, Kitale
- Koobi Fora, at Sibiloi National Park
- Lamu Museum, Lamu
- Meru Museum, Meru
- Nyeri Museum, Nyeri
- Malindi Museum, Malindi
- Mnarani ruins, Kilifi
- Narok Museum, Narok
- Olorgesailie, near Magadi
- Siyu Fort, Pate Island
- Takwa ruins, Manda Island
- Thimlich Ohinga, 45 km west of Migori

== See also ==
- List of museums in Kenya
- List of sites and monuments in Kenya
