= Rabai Museum =

- Established: 1998; 28 years ago
- Location: Rabai, Kenya
- Coordinates: 3.929164°S 39.573513°E
- Type: History Museum

The Rabai Museum is a museum located in Kenya. The museum is located in the first Christian church building constructed in Kenya. Much of the museum focuses on the work of Johann Ludwig Krapf, who built the church with Johannes Rebmann.

== History ==
In 1844, a member of the Church Missionary Society named Johann Ludwig Krapf began angelic activities in Kenya. Krapf & Rebmann purchased land from the elders of Rabai Kaya to build the church, which was completed in 1846. The objective with the construction of this church was to establish Christian villages in East Africa, Rabai being one of the first in Kenya. In 1998, the museum was inaugurated with the support of the German Embassy. The museum was established by the National Museums of Kenya to preserve books, maps and documents. A KSh.9 million/= restoration project was also undertaken to renovate the structure of the museum. Much of the funding for the restoration project was provided by the Anglican Church of Kenya and the German Embassy. The state-owned National Museums of Kenya Corporation provided 2 million Kenyan Shilling in addition to overseeing the restoration of the museum. The renovation work included the conversion of the Rebmann and Krapf cottages into a resource center.

== Collections ==
The museum contains exhibits about the history of Christianity and the Slave Trade. The museum also has cultural artifacts of the Mijikenda peoples. Among the Mijikenda ethnographic objects in the museum are a regalia, traditional clothing such as a hando (short skirt) and kishutu (colored fabric), as well as tools used to prepare traditional food.

== See also ==
- List of museums in Kenya
