= Meru Museum =

History museum in Meru, Kenya

Coordinates: 0°02′51″N 37°39′03″E

- Established: 1974
- Location: Meru, Kenya
- Collections: Cultural history and practices of the Meru people.

The Meru Museum is a museum located in Meru, Kenya. Its exhibits focus on the cultural history and practices of the Meru people.

== History ==
The museum building was built in 1916, and was used as the District Commissioner Office, and is the oldest stone building in Meru. In 1973, the National Museums of Kenya made an agreement to renovate the structure into a local museum. The museum first opened in 1974: the National Museums of Kenya along with the Meru County and Municipal Council completed the renovations of the museum structure; the objective with the creation of this museum was to have a space that would be about the local history of this region of Kenya. In the same year, George Kirigia was assigned as the museum's curator.

== Collections ==
The museum contains various historical artefacts of the Meru culture. The museum contains exhibits on stone tools dating from the prehistoric period and taxidermied animals. The main museum gallery is composed of three sections, dedicated to the history of the Meru culture containing ethnographic objects, human evolution and the natural history of the area of Kenya where the museum is located. The museum also has exhibits that focus on the development of different techniques in Kenyan agriculture. In the cultural section, the museum has several exhibits of traditional clothing, tools and weapons, including arrows, bows, grindstones and spears. The museum contains a fish pond, and exhibits on small mammals, birds and reptiles from this area of Kenya. The museum also contains exhibits on dinosaurs. In addition, the museum contains a statue of Living Mugwe, a leader of the Meru people. The museum has a garden where medicinal plants native to Kenya are cultivated and conserved, there are about 23 plants, including Aloe secundiflora, Clausena anisata, Commiphora zimmermanii, Dioscorea minutiflora and Warburgia ugandensis.

== See also ==
- List of museums in Kenya
