= Kakapel Rockshelter =

Kenyan national monument

Kakapel Rockshelter is a Kenyan national monument and archeological site named after the village where it is located on the western slopes of Mt. Elgon in Kenya. It dates to the Late Stone Age (Kansyore), the Early and Late Iron Age, and the historic period associated with Nilotic migrations. It has produced the earliest evidence of finger millet exploitation and cowpea domestication in the region. aDNA has revealed relatedness between past people in the region and those in west Africa. The site's rock art is thought to be the most intricate piece of artwork in the region that had multiple occupations. Community archeology as well as collaborations between the National Museums of Kenya (NMK) and the Trust for African Rock Art (TARA), the Rock Art Research Institute (RARI), and the Max Planck Institute continue to bring the lifeways of ancient people in this region to life.

== Location and setting ==
Kakapel (formerly Kakapeli) is a granitic inselberg in the Chelelmuk hills in Busia County in western Kenya. The site is located on the western slopes of Mt. Elgon at an altitude of 1420 meters asl. The area has been continuously occupied, first by Kalenjins, then by Bukusu, and then by the Teso. The site was declared a national monument by the government of Kenya in 2004. It is one of the twenty-nine site museums of the National Museums of Kenya. The site consists of three fairly shallow shelters close to the base of the outcrop.

== Research ==
=== Previous research ===
Osaga Odak, then part of the University of Nairobi, published the first report on Kakapel in 1977. The site was exposed following the clearing of the impenetrable bushes in the region. The paintings can be divided into three panels, and each of them described with regard to artistic representation, space attributed to particular paintings, color, identity of the painting, preservation, and destruction status. Cattle are the main domestic animals present and are part of the figures which indicate skillful use of perspective. In 1978, Odak organized an expedition dubbed the Prehistoric Art of Kenya Project in western Kenya and carried out a regional survey. There were no comparable rock art sites that were found within the Chelemuk Hills, prompting the team to conclude that the site was an important location for the earlier inhabitants. TARA re-documented the site in 1997.

=== Current research ===
A team from the National Museums of Kenya and TARA returned to the site in 2002 only to find it vandalized. The second phase of research was carried out first by RARI and the National Museums of Kenya where the art of Kakapel was retraced. Through community engagement, TARA and the NMK carried out training and built a cultural center to ensure the conservation of the site. There were two seasons of archaeological research: in 2012, there were test excavations at the site, rock painting analysis, and collection of samples for environmental reconstruction and expansive excavations in 2015. Excavations resumed in the region in 2018, as part of collaborative research between the National Museums of Kenya and the Max Planck Institute for the Science of Human History in Germany. Notably, is the investigation of the importance of shape and size of grain to distinguish Eleusine corocana (finger millet) populations across time and space, alongside evidence for early agriculture (domesticated cowpea). Shifts toward wetter conditions later supported wider crop cultivation and may have contributed to farming expansion into western Kenya.

== Dating/chronology ==
The site is dated to four periods using radiocarbon dating. First, human remains also sampled for aDNA, produced a date of 3900 BP, placing the site in the Later Stone Age of East Africa, also identified as Kansyore. Two other individuals (human remains) also used in the aDNA study, dated to 900 and 300 BP (two late Iron Age dates). Twenty-three samples from plants (including charcoal) and other animal remains have yielded dates ranging from 9000 BP to 300 BP showing use of the site during the Holocene.

== Finds ==
The shelter walls have rock art (people, animals, and geometric representations). The excavations yielded a sizable collection that includes ceramics (punctated and roulette pottery), wood, human remains, charcoal, seeds, and nutshells as well as archaeological features (pits and hearths). There are also uncarbonized materials and other carbonized materials that are difficult to identify.

=== Archaeobotany ===
Soil samples collected during the excavation were floated to separate heavy and light fractions in order to extract the archaeobotanical remains. Only a small percentage of the seeds were identified beyond family level. The site has yielded the first evidence for finger millet (E. coracana) and cowpea (V. unguiculata) cultivation in western Kenya. Peas, millet and other crops might have therefore been introduced in the region from northeast Africa following River Nile. The spread of crops to regions like Kakapel was influenced more by cultural exchange and trade networks than by climate change alone.

=== Zooarchaeology ===
A large faunal assemblage was recovered but only specimens measuring more than 2 cm were analyzed. Traditional zooarchaeology was conducted at the National Museums of Kenya using available comparative collections. The bones were very fragmented and Zooarcheology by Mass Spectrometry (ZooMS) was employed to ascertain species identifications. These data revealed that people at Kakapel relied on hunting into the historic period despite access and reliance on domesticates.

=== Rock art ===
Kakapel rock art is arguably the most elaborative art work of past populations in the region that might belong to different groups of people. There are both schematic and naturalistic representations in white, red and brown. There are single executions as well as superimpositions of white figures that overlay those in red. The differences in physical conditions and color suggest use of the site by different groups of people, with those who used the red paint having inhabited the area earlier. White human figures are marked and highly stylized compared to other representations. Also, there are red figures that could possibly be human figures or snakes. The cattle (domestic animals) are somewhat detailed, with an emphasis on the fact that they are hump-less and have large-sized horns. Other animals represented include white giraffes with outstretched necks, a tortoise, an antelope, a grazing pig-like animal, a bi-chrome mole-like animal, an unidentified long-necked polychrome figure and six-legged figures and elephants. Tools including spears, arrows, shields, and a boat are also represented. A relatively high number of schematic representations include, all-white concentric circles (some hooked with radial lines), single circles, spirals, heart shaped objects, dots and rayed figures. The rock art has not been directly dated but is thought to have been drawn between 2000 and 4000 years ago based by representations of the different art.

== Genetics/ aDNA ==
The ancient DNA of individuals from Kakapel shows a stronger genetic connection to the Mbuti, a population of central African hunter-gatherers, compared to Levantine individuals.

== Conservation ==
The southward orientation of the panels protects the art from the east–west winds that blow in the area naturally conserving the site. TARA, while following up on an earlier study, found that the site had been destroyed with graffiti. They therefore, in partnership with the NMK, raised funds to conserve the site. The community is involved at all levels of the projects at Kakapel with the goal of conserving the rock art. Additionally, a fence was installed in 2015 to protect the rock art panels.
