= Kitale Museum =

Natural history museum in Kitale, Kenya

Coordinates: 1.013428°N 35.00538°E

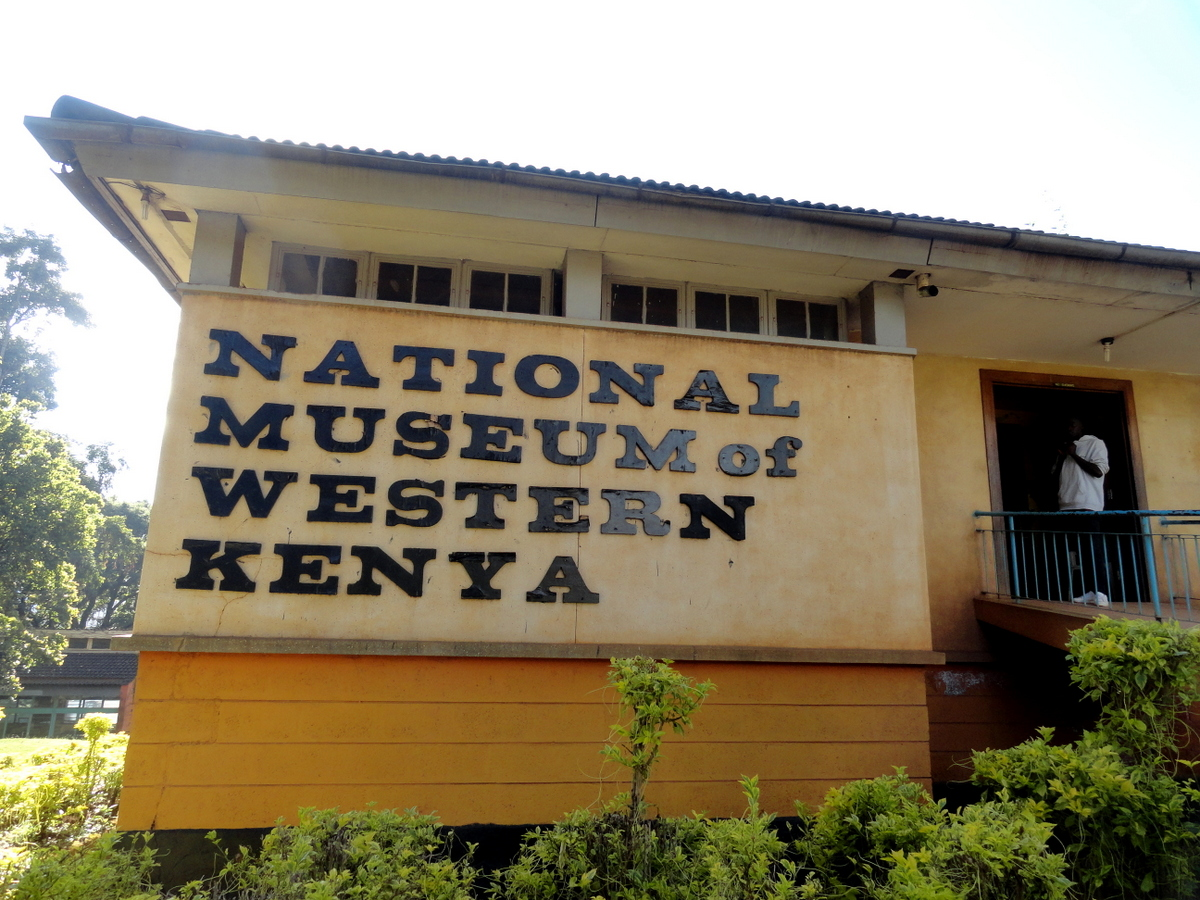
- National Museum of Western Kenya in Kitale
- Former name: Stoneham Museum
- Established: 1924
- Location: Western Kenya in Trans-Nzoia County
- Collections: Nile crocodiles, leopard tortoises and various venomous snakes such as the puff adder, rock python, Gaboon viper and the rhinoceros viper

First opened in 1924 to the public, the Kitale Museum is the first domestic museum opened in Kenya. Originally, it was known as the Stoneham Museum, named after Colonel Hugh Stoneham. He had been a large contributor and collector of the artifacts held within the museum up until his death in 1966. It was later renamed the Kitale Museum when it was established by the National Museums of Kenya in 1974.

The Kitale Museum used to be a privately owned museum prior to the death of Colonel Stoneham. After he died he willed funds as well as his entire collection, which included an extensive insect collection to the Kenyan government so that they could establish a national museum. In 1974 a new museum building was founded in Kitale on 5 acres of land making the Kitale Museum the first regional museum to become a part of the Kenya Museum Society.

Kitale Museum is located in western Kenya in Trans-Nzoia County. It is exactly 380 kilometres northwest from the nation's capital, Nairobi. The museum is 1 km west of the town centre on the outskirts of Kitale. A majority of the collections within the museum are items gathered from various tribes within Kenya such as the Luyha, Maasai and the Turkana. The museum displays their traditional Kenyan homes, weaponry, utensils and native musical instruments. The museum also includes a nature trail, which was created in 1977 and is located towards the back of the museum. This nature trail conserves various rare plants and animals. It is a serene makeshift rainforest that allows visitors of the museum to experience what it's like to be inside an actual Kenyan rainforest. The museum also holds animals such as Nile crocodiles, leopard, tortoises and various poisonous snakes such as the puff adder, rock python, Gaboon viper and the rhinoceros viper.

The museum showcases the history of the communities in Kenya, especially the Luhya tribe. This showcases the setup of a Bukusu homestead which comprises the main house, the kitchen and boys sleeping house also known as a SIMBA. The Sabaot homestead consists of circular huts (mostly of about 20 metres in diameter) and is divided into two parts: the front part called Koima, in which most of the people live, while the back smaller part is called Injoor and is mainly reserved for small endangered animals like goats and sheep.

== See also ==
- List of museums in Kenya
