= Lydia Gatundu Galavu =

Artist and art curator

- Citizenship: Nairobi Kenya
- Education: Masters degree in Anthropology from the University of Nairobi in Kenya.
- Occupations: Artist and a trained art educator Painter and sculptor
- Organization: An art curator at the National Museums of Kenya
- Movement: A member of International Council of Museums (ICOM). A member of the National Arts Committee.
- Awards: Scholar Fellowship Award of Omooba Yemisi Adedoyin Shyllon Art Foundation (OYASAF)

Lydia Gatundu Galavu is an art curator at the National Museums of Kenya in Nairobi, where she manages the Museum's collection with a focus on contemporary art exhibition.

== Career ==
Galavu has a masters degree in Anthropology from the University of Nairobi in Kenya. She is an artist and a trained art educator with experience teaching in schools. She is a painter and sculptor, occasionally participating in exhibitions to showcase her work. Galavu is part of the organizing committee for the Kenya Museum society and her work has been published in Kenya Past and Present by the Kenya Museum Society.

== Exhibitions ==
Galavu has organised a number of exhibitions in the National Museums of Kenya and outside the museum. She participated in the establishment of Uhuru Gardens Heroes Museums in Nairobi and in organizing the Pavilion of Kenya at 57th Venice Biennale. Galavu is a member of the advisory board of the 18th Istanbul Biennale. She is also a founding member of the artists collective Hawa Artists project since 2000 with artists Margaretta Akinyi Ocholla, Dorcas Omari, Nancy Wangari, Rosetta Makali and Nicho Makau. Galavu participated in the design and development of the collaborative travel 'Kanga Stories' exploring the cultural significance of the Kanga cloth across East and Central Africa. In 2024 she exhibited in the Feast of Art 2024 at village markets in Nairobi that showcases the evolution of modern visual art from East Africa. She is also assisting the Kenya Museum Society in organising affordable art show exhibitions at the National Museums of Kenya fostering artistic discourse in the region.

== Awards ==
Galavu received Scholar Fellowship Award of Omooba Yemisi Adedoyin Shyllon Art Foundation (OYASAF). She is also a member of International Council of Museums (ICOM). She is also a member of the National Arts Committee.

== Publications ==
- Tapping art for economic gain
- Grim picture for national gallery without funding
- Towards a national art gallery of Kenya
- Sending out message of hope during Easter
