= Tambach Museum =

The Tambach Museum is a museum located in Tambach, Kenya. It is located in the former District Commissioner's residence.

== See also ==
- List of museums in Kenya
