= Wajir Museum =

- Established: April 19, 2011; 14 years ago
- Location: Wajir, Kenya
- Coordinates: 1.74697°N 40.06451°E
- Type: Cultural museum

The Wajir Museum (Swahili: Makumbusho ya Wajir; Somali: Matxafka Wajeer) is a museum located in northeastern Kenya. The museum is in charge of showing the different cultures that inhabit Wajir. The museum is managed by the state-owned National Museums of Kenya Corporation. This is the first museum in Wajir County.

== History ==
The building where the museum is located is one of the oldest in Wajir, this building was constructed by Italian prisoners of war. In 2007, the National Museums of Kenya Corporation conducted a survey in which it recommended the establishment of a museum in the larger Wajir district. The building was transformed into a museum and was inaugurated in 2011. One of the reasons the museum was created was to encourage tourism in Northern Kenya. The inauguration of the museum was attended by the Minister of State for Development of Northern Kenya Mohammed Ibrahim Elmi. The Kenya Museum Society donated a DVD player, solar power system and TV set to the museum. In December 2015, the second Wajir cultural festival was held at the museum, the event was organized by the National Museums of Kenya and the Wajir County government.

== Collections ==
The museum preserves the historical and natural heritage of this area of Kenya. The museum contains exhibits dedicated to the Northern Kenyan communities such as the Samburu, Gabra, Daasanach, El Molo, Boorana, Somali, Pokot, Turkana and Rendile.
