= Evelyn Napier Molony =

British botanist

- Born: Evelyn Rose Napier; 13 December 1902; Lucknow, India
- Died: 22 August 1952 (aged 49); Nakuru, Kenya
- Occupations: Botanist, curator
- Relatives: Robert Napier, 1st Baron Napier of Magdala (grandfather)

Evelyn Rose Napier Molony (13 December 1902 – 22 August 1952) was a British botanist and curator born in India and based in Kenya. She was the botanist at the Coryndon Memorial Museum in Nairobi from 1930 to 1934.

== Early life and education ==
Napier was born in Lucknow, the daughter of Lord Edward Herbert Scott (afterwards 4th Baron Napier of Magdala) and Florence Martha Perceval, Lady Napier. Her father was a civil engineer employed by the Indian State Railways, and one of the younger sons of Robert Napier, 1st Baron Napier of Magdala. Her only brother became the 5th Baron Napier of Magdala. She moved to Kenya with her family in 1922. She trained at the Royal Botanical Gardens at Kew for three months in 1930, when the East African Natural History Society hired her to organize an herbarium in Nairobi.

== Career ==
Napier was a botanical illustrator and collector. As the botanist on staff at the Coryndon Memorial Museum in Nairobi, Napier started, built and organized the museum's collection of East African specimens, and contributed specimens to the Kew Herbarium. Napier also illustrated publications by others, including Gardening in East Africa (1934), edited by Arthur John Jex-Blake. In 1934 she gave lectures with lantern slides about her work to women's groups, while visiting England.

After marriage, Molony lived on a farm near Nakuru, and continued collecting plants for the Corydon herbarium.

== Personal life and legacy ==
Napier married Desmond Walter Molony in 1935. They had two children, Martin and Merrial. She died from cancer in 1952, at the age of 49. Her husband remarried in 1954. Dicleptera napierae and Bidens napierae are two of the East African flower species named in her honor. In the 1950s, the botanical specimens at the Coryndon were consolidated with those of the Amani Herbarium to form the East African Herbarium, "the largest Herbarium collection in tropical Africa". In 1996, a specimen of Grevea eggelingii that she collected in 1934 was considered in a taxonomic re-evaluation of the species. In 2010, specimens of Solanum polhillii that she collected in the 1930s were included in a study of environmental change in Kenya.
