= Garissa Museum =

Museum in Kenya

The Garissa Museum
- Location: Kenya

The Garissa Museum is a museum located in Kenya.

== See also ==
- List of museums in Kenya
