= Narok Museum =

Coordinates: 1.089545°S 35.874372°E

- Location: Narok, Kenya
- Type: Ethnographic Museum
- Collections: Maasai cultural heritage, as well as other Maa-speaking cultures, including the Samburu, Njemps and Ndorobo people
- Visitors: 642 (2014)
- Owner: National Museums of Kenya

The Narok Museum is a museum located in Narok, Kenya. The museum is dedicated to exhibiting artifacts, relics and paintings of the Maa-speaking communities.

== History ==
The building where the museum is located was a former community center. The museum contains exhibits that were collected over the years in the county.

== Collections ==
The museum contains exhibits about Maasai people, as well as artifacts from other Maa-speaking communities, including the Ndorobos, Samburu and Njemps. The museum contains paintings by Joy Adamson created in the 1950s. The museum also exhibits black and white photographs. The museum contains displays about the traditions of the Maasai culture. The photo gallery presents photos about the daily life of the women of the communities that inhabit this part of Kenya. The museum also exhibits Maasai clothing and jewelry, as well as traditional weapons and tools of daily life. The museum also contains a small reconstruction of Maasai tribal huts.

== See also ==
- List of museums in Kenya
