= Kabarnet Museum =

Coordinates: 0.491632°N 35.742431°E

The Kabarnet Museum
- Location: Kenya
- Collections: Great Rift Valley and its peoples, including the Keiyo / Marakwet, Samburu, Pokot, Nandi and Kipsigis

The Kabarnet Museum is a museum located in Kabarnet, Kenya. It features galleries relating to the Great Rift Valley and its peoples, including the Keiyo / Marakwet, Samburu, Pokot, Nandi and Kipsigis.

== See also ==
- List of museums in Kenya
