= Kitale Airport =

- IATA: KTL; ICAO: HKKT

Summary
- Airport type: Public, Civilian
- Owner: Kenya Airports Authority
- Serves: Kitale, Kenya
- Location: Kitale, Kenya
- Elevation AMSL: 6,070 ft / 1,850 m
- Coordinates: 00°58′30″N 34°57′36″E

Map
- Location of Kitale Airport in Kenya; Placement on map is approximate

Runways
Direction	Length		Surface
Direction	ft	m	Surface
22/04	4,757	1,450	Asphalt

Kitale Airport is an airport in Kitale, Kenya.

== Location ==
Kitale Airport (IATA: KTL, ICAO: HKKT) is located in the town of Kitale, Trans-Nzoia County, in northwestern Kenya, close to the International border with the Republic of Uganda.

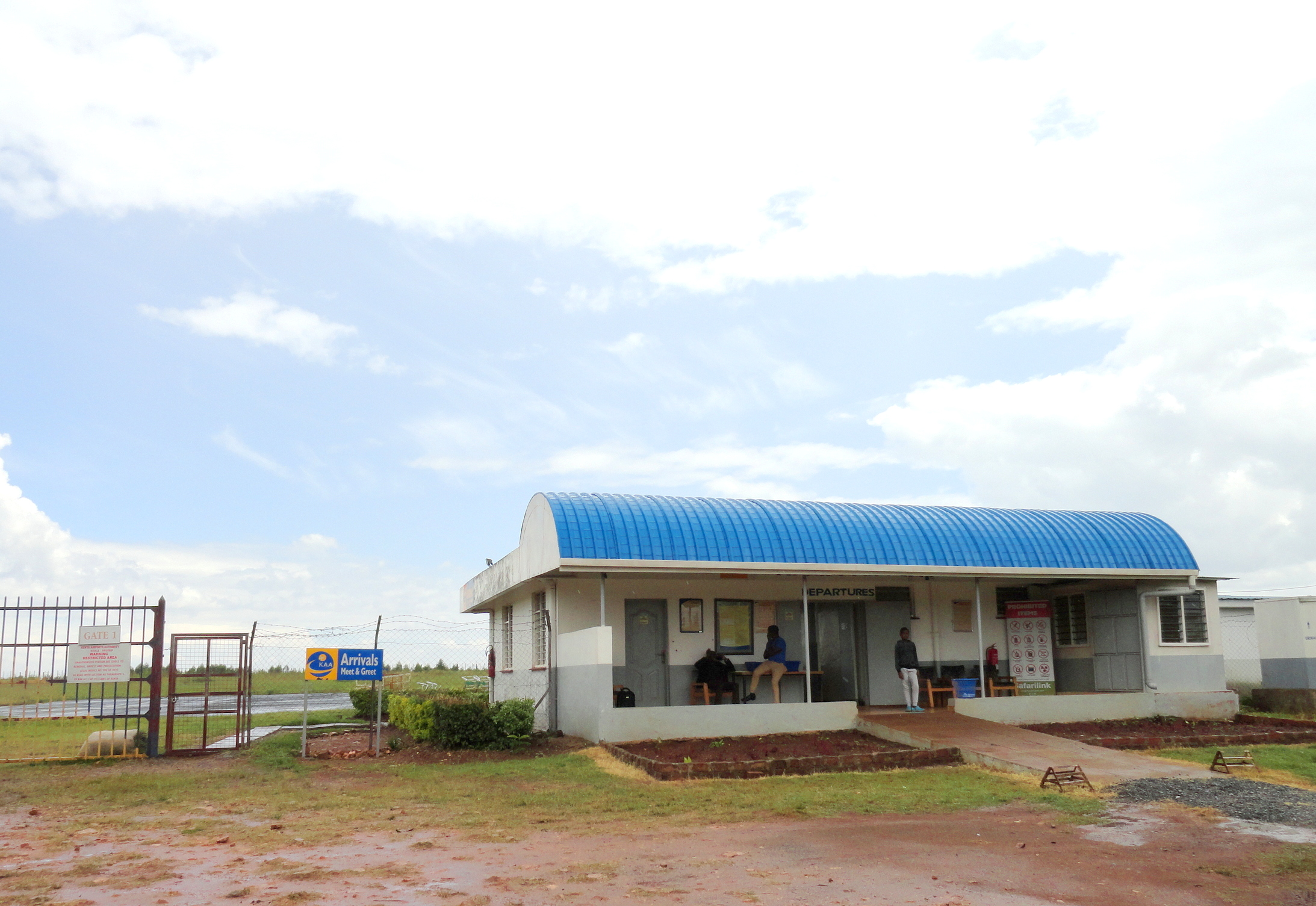
Kitale Airport terminal

Its location is approximately 336 kilometres (209 mi), by air, northwest of Nairobi International Airport, the country's largest civilian airport. The geographic coordinates of this airport are:0° 58' 30.00"N, 34° 57' 36.00"E (Latitude:0.975000; Longitude:34.960000).

== Overview ==
Kitale Airport is a small airstrip commonly referred to as kambi miwa airstrip by the local people, the airstrip serves the town of Kitale and surrounding communities. Situated at 6,070 feet (1,850 m) above sea level, the airport has a single asphalt runway which measures 4,757 feet (1,450 m) in length and 57 feet (17 m) in width.

== Airlines and destinations ==
Airlines	Destinations
Skyward Express	Nairobi–Wilson

== See also ==
- Kenya Airports Authority
- Kenya Civil Aviation Authority
- List of airports in Kenya
