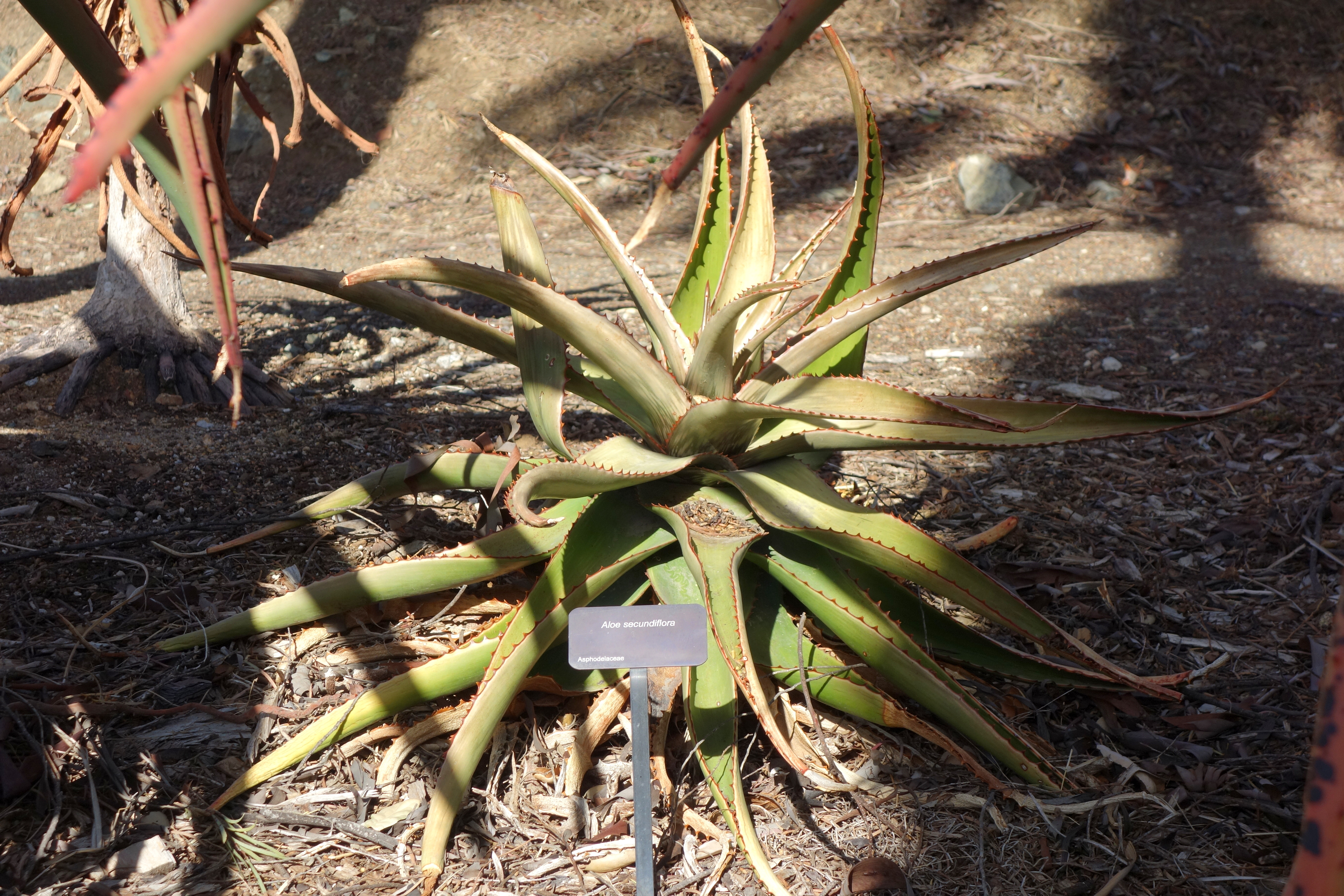

Conservation status
- Least Concern (IUCN 3.1)
- CITES Appendix II (CITES)

Scientific classification
- Kingdom: Plantae
- Clade: Tracheophytes
- Clade: Angiosperms
- Clade: Monocots
- Order: Asparagales
- Family: Asphodelaceae
- Subfamily: Asphodeloideae
- Genus: Aloe
- Species: A. secundiflora

Binomial name
- Aloe secundiflora Engl.

= Aloe secundiflora =

Species of succulent

Aloe secundiflora is an aloe widespread in open grassland and bushland in Ethiopia, Sudan, Kenya, and Tanzania.

Usually an acaulescent rosette of spreading, glossy, dull glaucous green leaves. The leaves are usually slightly recurved at the tips. Young plants often have spots on their leaves, especially the undersides.

The tall (1m) erect inflorescence has up to 20 spreading branches, each with a cylindrical raceme of pink-red flowers.
