= Kisumu Museum =

Kenyan museum

Coordinates: 0°06′27″S 34°45′47″E

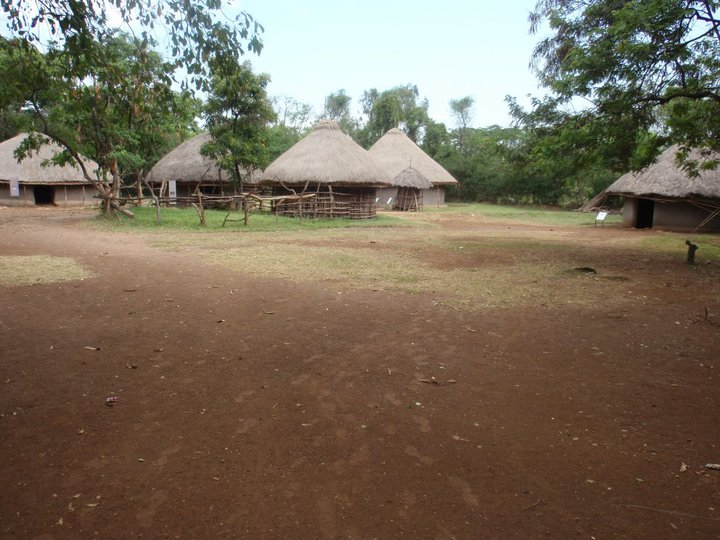
- Luo's "ber gi dala". The cow paddock. Kisumu Museum - Kenya
- Established: 1980
- Location: Kisumu, Kenya
- Collections: local flora and fauna, as well as a traditional Luo homestead

The Kisumu Museum is a museum located in Kisumu, Kenya. Its exhibits focus on the natural and cultural history of Western Kenya. It features a collection of local flora and fauna, as well as a traditional Luo homestead.

The museum was opened 1980.

== See also ==
- List of museums in Kenya
