= Wray Memorial Museum =

- Established: December 6, 2006; 18 years ago
- Location: Teri, Kenya
- Coordinates: 3.509035°S 38.575439°E
- Type: Historical & Cultural Museum

The Wray Memorial Museum (Swahili: Makumbusho ya Kumbukumbu ya Wray), sometimes called the Sagalla Cultural Museum, is a museum located in Teri, Kenya, and is dedicated to displaying religious artifacts. The museum also exhibits cultural artifacts from the Sagalla community.

== History ==
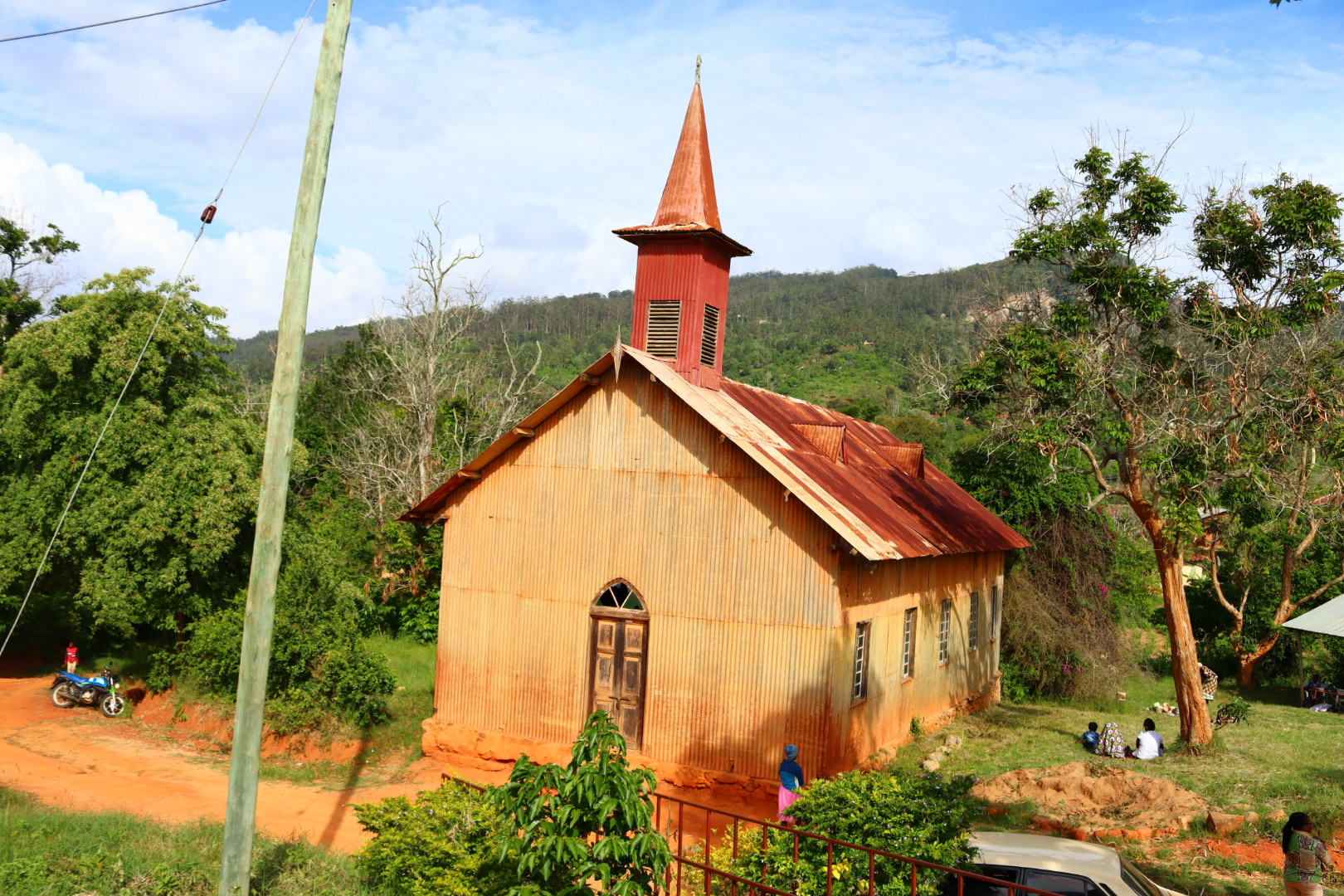

The museum is located in one of the oldest churches in Kenya. In 1883, Joseph Wray arrived in Sagalla. Joseph Wray asked the Sagalla community to donate the land of a hill to the Church Missionary Society. The construction of the church began in the 1890s. In 1901, the construction of the church was completed. Reverend Joseph Wray was the first missionary to establish an Anglican church in the hinterland of Kenya, Joseph Wray used the sanctuary to convert people who wanted to adopt Christianity. Joseph Wray wrote an English-Sagalla dictionary, a hymnal in the Sagalla dialect, and the book 'Kenya: Our newest colony'. In 1912, Wray returned to England. The church was originally called St. Mark's Church. In December 2006 it was converted into a museum. In 2014, the Taita Taveta County government entered into an agreement with the National Museums of Kenya to preserve tourist sites in the county, including the museum. In 2017, officials from the state corporation National Museums of Kenya visited the museum. During Sagalla's 2019 cultural day, Tourism executive Milkah Righa spoke about tourism at the museum. Museum staff members such as Liverson Mwanyumba Manga supervised the planting of trees native to the Sagalla Hills.

== Collections ==
The museum contains the original pulpit that was used when the church was opened, a baptismal basin used by Joseph Wray as well as a list of those who were baptized. Other objects in the museum include a quiver full of arrows belonging to Mzee Mwang'ondi Nzano, the museum also contains a traditional stool. Among the historical artifacts, there is a fuwa which is a bowl made of wood used by the Taita people, a hunter's bowl made of leather called Kikuchu, a plate made of dried gourd called Kioro, an Iwembe, a horn used for drinking beer. The museum also contains a grindstone called a lwala. The museum contains diaries and antique furniture. The museum also contains photographs from the 19th century.
