= Nyeri Museum =

History museum in Kenya

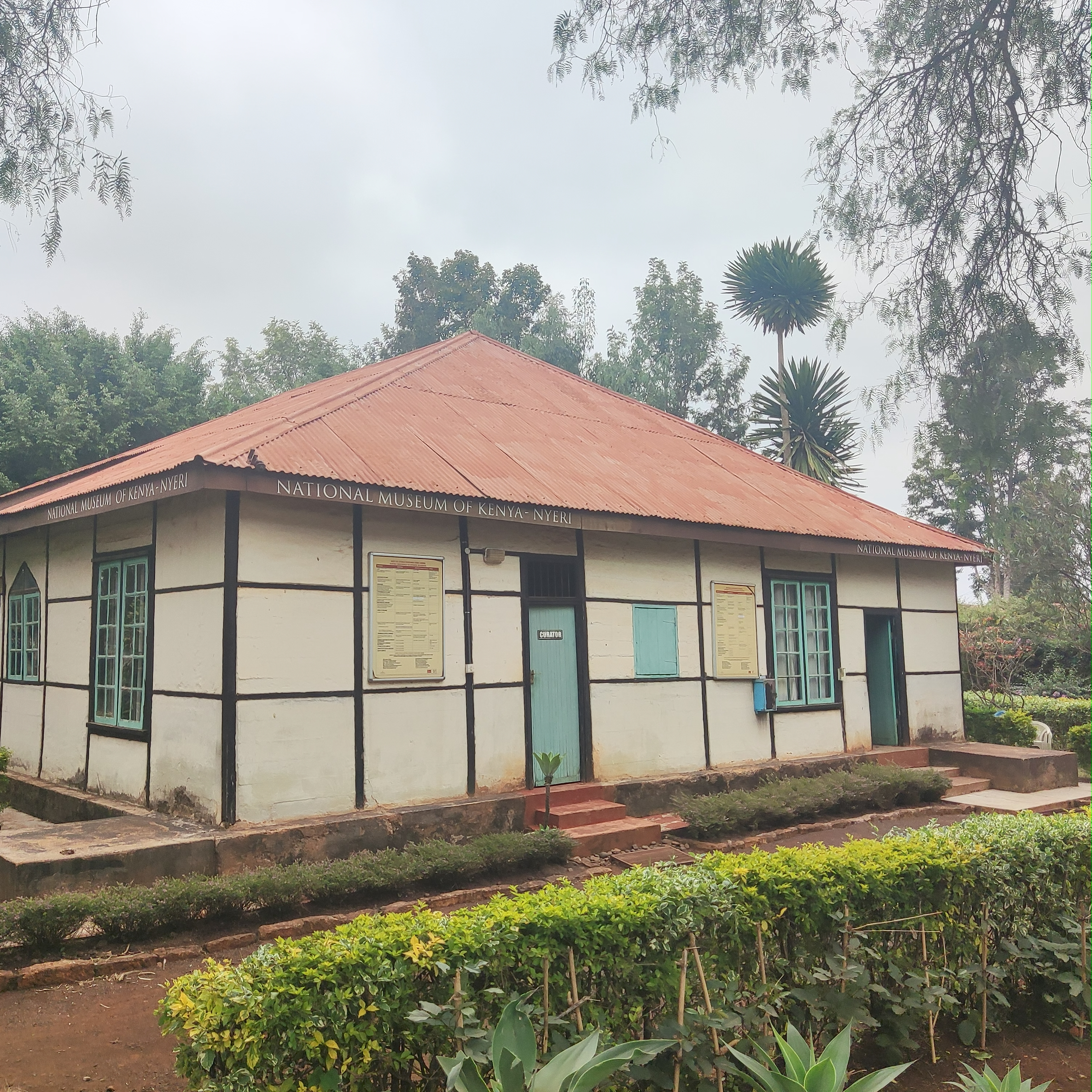
- Location: Nyeri, Kenya
- Coordinates: 0.439980°S 36.964068°E
- Type: History museum

The Nyeri Museum (Swahili: Makumbusho ya Nyeri) is a history museum located in Nyeri, Kenya. The museum is dedicated to the history of Kenya and the Kikuyu culture.

== History ==
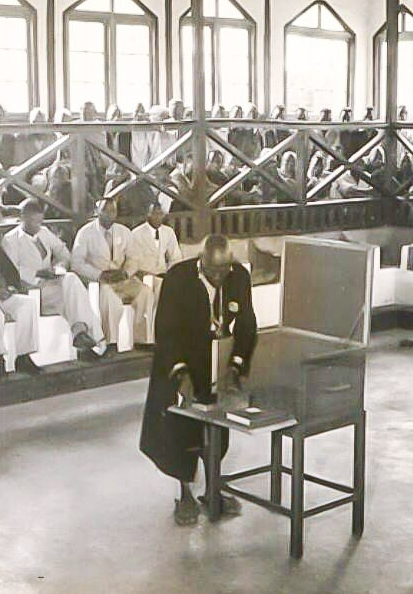
Several members of the Nyeri Native Council inside the local courthouse circa 1940, which later became the county museum.

The museum building was built in 1924, but it began to be used in 1925 to settle common law cases. The intention with creating this building was to centralize the cases in a customary system of justice in the Colony of Kenya. An additional hall was built due to the increase in cases, the reason for this is because the courtroom was unable to handle so many cases, civil cases were held in the first courtroom while criminal cases were held in the second courtroom. In the 1970s, after the construction of the Nyeri Law Courts, this building became obsolete and was later used as a meeting hall by the Nyeri Municipal Council. In 1997, control of the building was transferred to the National Museums of Kenya. At that time, the National Museums of Kenya decided to renovate the building. In 2001, the museum was declared national property.

In November 2019, Google collaborated with the National Museums of Kenya, and among its programs included an adapted version of Google Street View of the Nyeri museum, in which it is possible to virtually visit the museum's rooms.

== Collections ==
The museum contains handmade weapons, iron shields and helmets used by the Mau Mau. The museum also contains a passbook used by the British to control the movement of different groups of peoples such as the Kikuyu, Meru and Embu. The museum contains information about Kenya's independence process. The museum has a collection of portraits of Tom Mboya and Pio Gama Pinto, as well as exhibits on the role of women in Kenyan history. The museum also has a collection of photographs of the Askaris. The museum contains helmets and shields from Kenya's colonial period, as well as bricks made by the Aguthi Works Camp detainees. The museum also has helmets and shields from colonial times.
