= Nairobi Gallery =

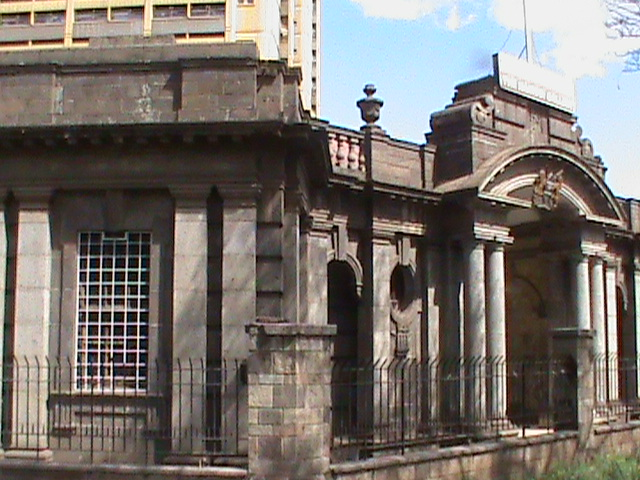
- Established: 2005; 21 years ago
- Location: Kenyatta Avenue, Nairobi, Kenya
- Coordinates: 1.286789°S 36.817833°E
- Type: Art Gallery

The Nairobi Gallery (Swahili: Nyumba ya sanaa ya Nairobi) is an art gallery located an at the edge of the Nairobi central business district. The gallery is dedicated to showcasing African art.

== History ==
The building was designed by C. Rand Ovary, the construction of which was completed in 1913 for the Ministry of Native Affairs, during colonial times, served as a government office that would have the function of counting marriages, births and deaths. From 1963, the building was used as the Provisional Commissioner's office until 1984. The building was later used as Kanu's branch office of Nairobi until 1997. In 1995, the building was declared a national monument. In 1997, ownership of the building was passed to the National Museums of Kenya. In 1999, the state corporation began the process of renovating the building. In 2005, the renovation work was completed and the gallery opened for the first time. During 2019, the National Museums of Kenya collaborated with Google to digitize the Nairobi gallery's exhibits to the Google Arts & Culture platform as well as add an adapted version of Google Street View to the museum's rooms.

== Collections ==
The gallery has a collection of pan-African stamps from different countries of the continent as well as a collection of Joseph Murumbi's photos. In the "Joseph and Sheila Murumbi's Room", there are several pieces of furniture such as a Lamu sofa, a Zanzibar cupboard and posters about African heritage. The gallery also contains African jewelry. Part of the jewelry belongs to the Turkana culture. The gallery also contains African stools, traditional weapons, containers used by different Kenyan communities to store things or cook. The gallery also contains Nubian baskets and wood carvings. The gallery contains sculptures and paintings by artists from different parts of Africa such as Nigeria with works by Bruce Onokbrakpeya, Joseph Olabode and Asiru Olatunde Osogbo. The gallery also contains traditional clothing such as Egunguns. The gallery contains traditional textiles such as a collection of kangas. In 2015, the gallery showed work by Kenyan artist Peterson Kamwathi. In 2018, the gallery organized an exhibition featuring works by nine East African women artists, including artwork by Margaret Trowell, Rosemary Karuga, Magdalene Odundo, Theresa Musoke, Robin Anderson, Yony Wait-e, Joy Adamson, Geraldine Robarts and Nani Croze. In 2019, the gallery exhibited Tinga Tinga paintings which originated in Tanzania. Also in 2019, the gallery presented an exhibition with artists from Tanzania that included works by artists Robina Ntila and Muzu Suleiman.

== Gallery ==
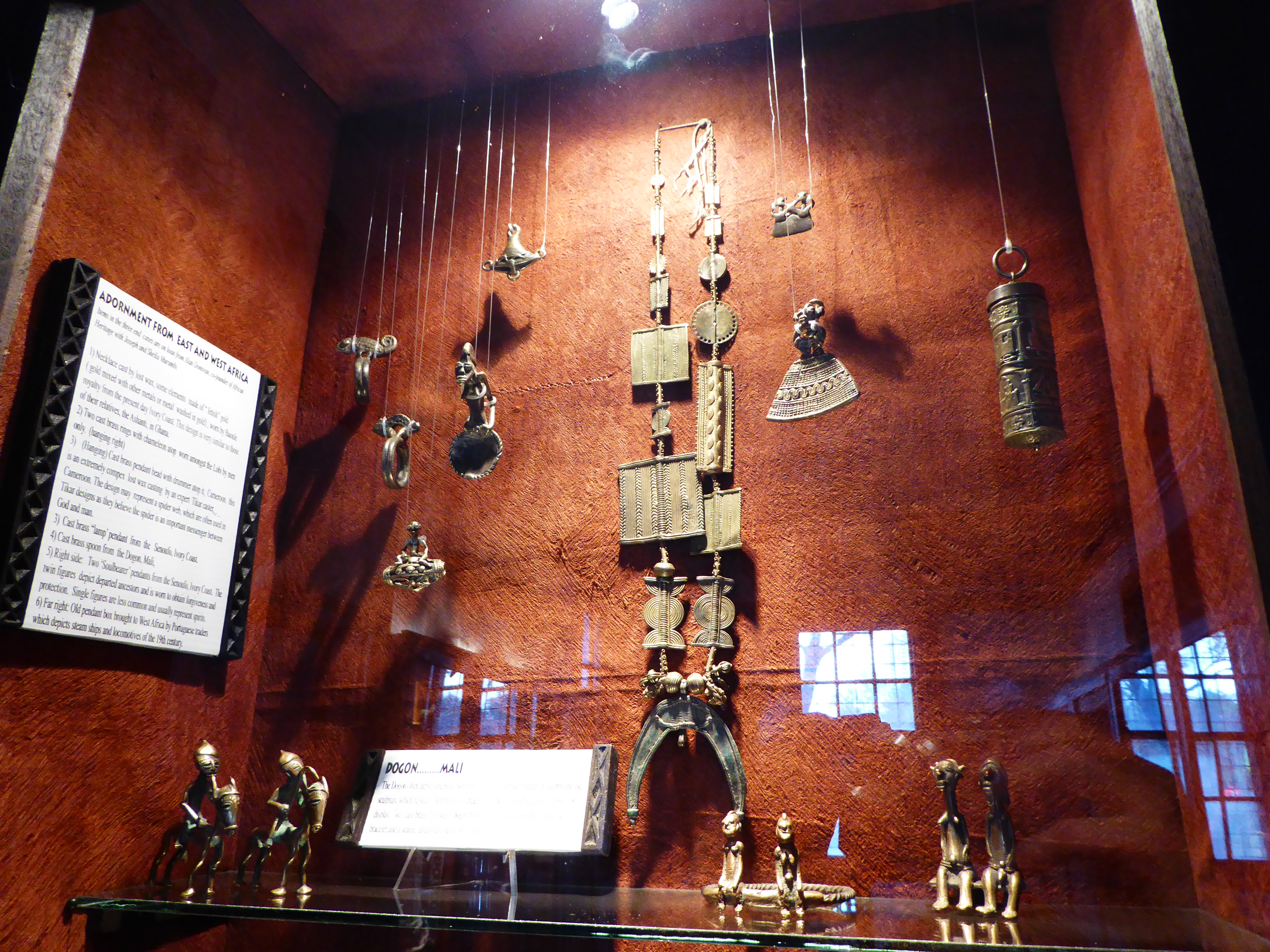
Adornment from East and West Africa

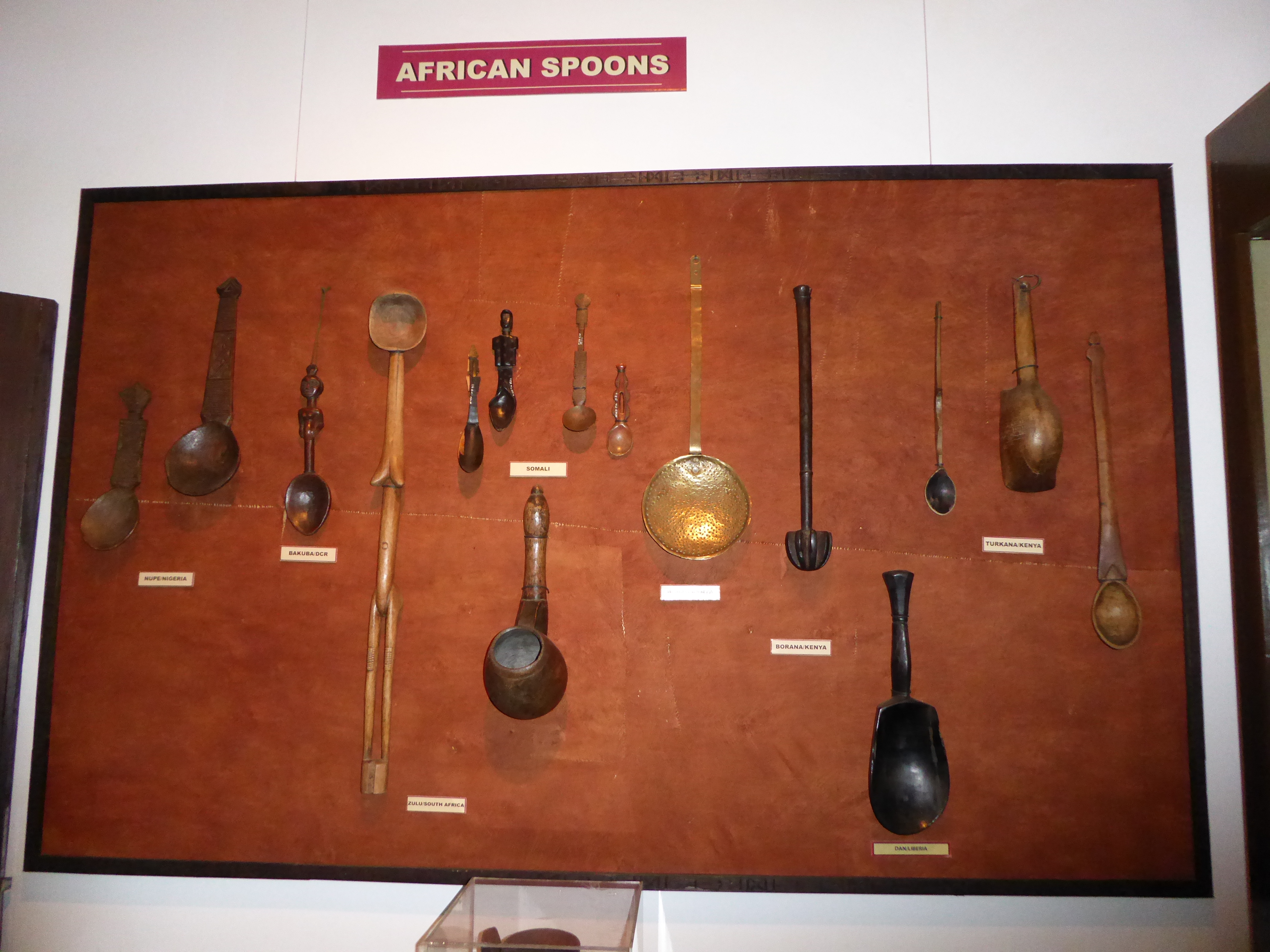
African spoons

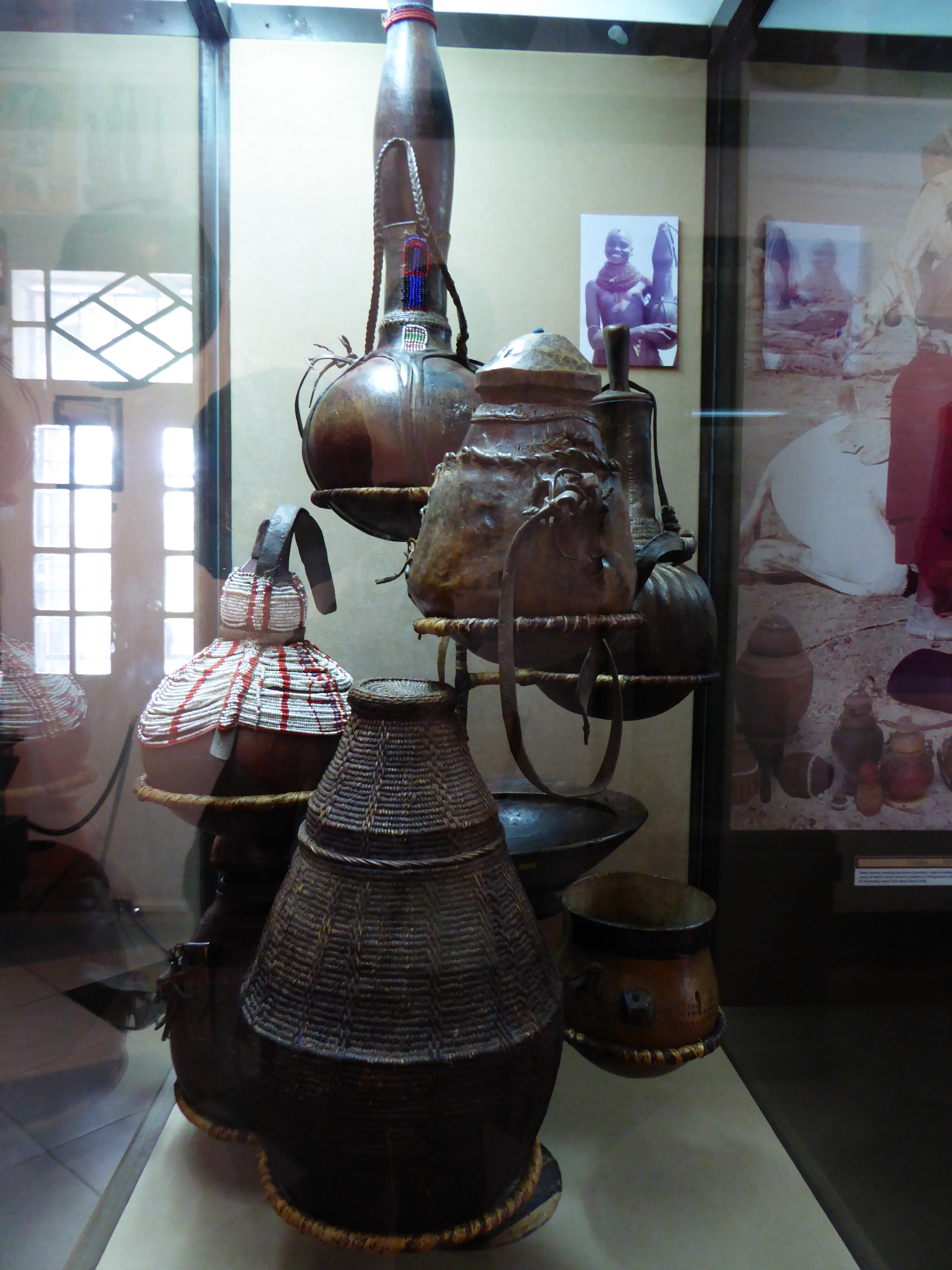
Desert containers

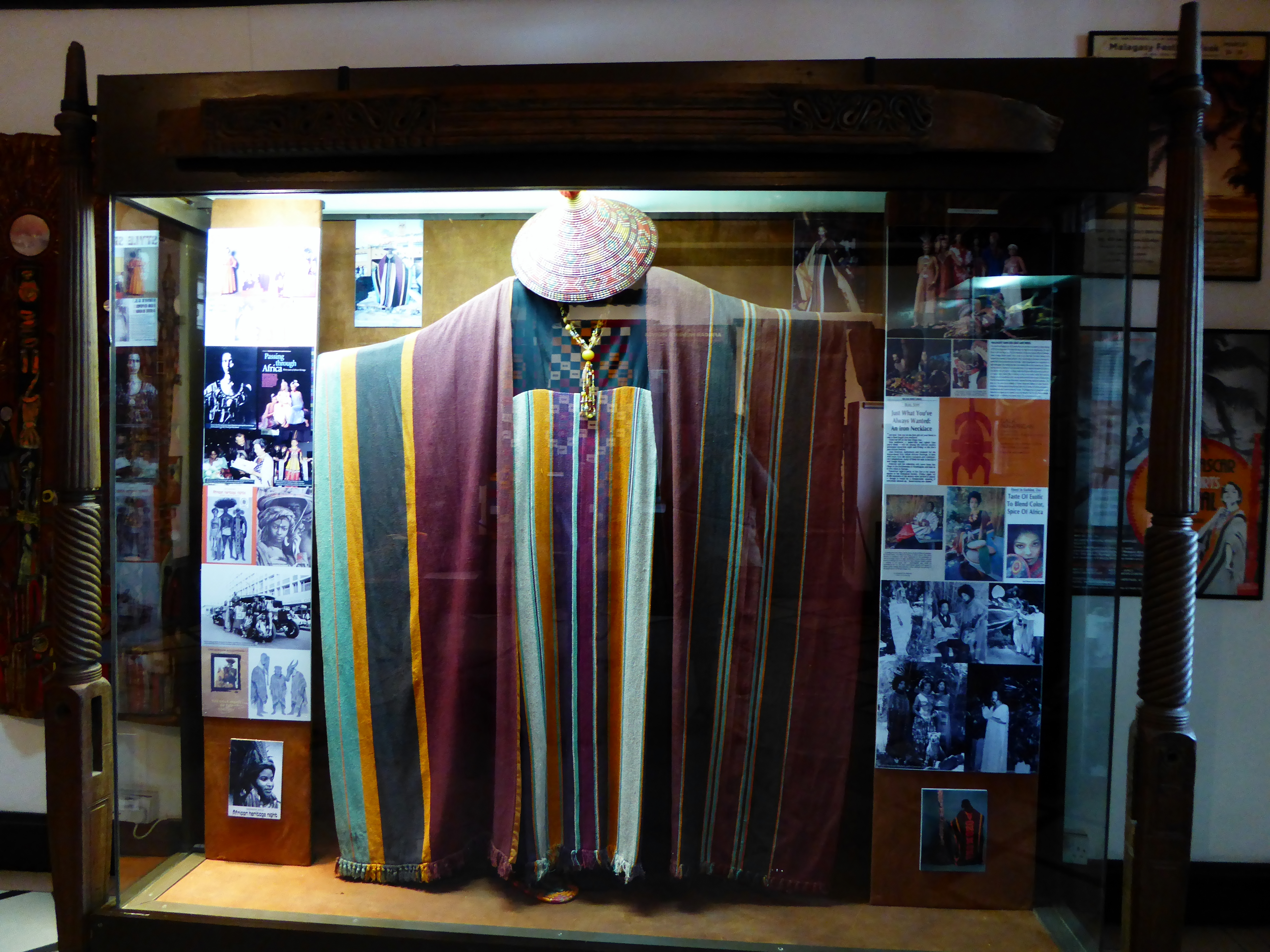
Traditional Vestments

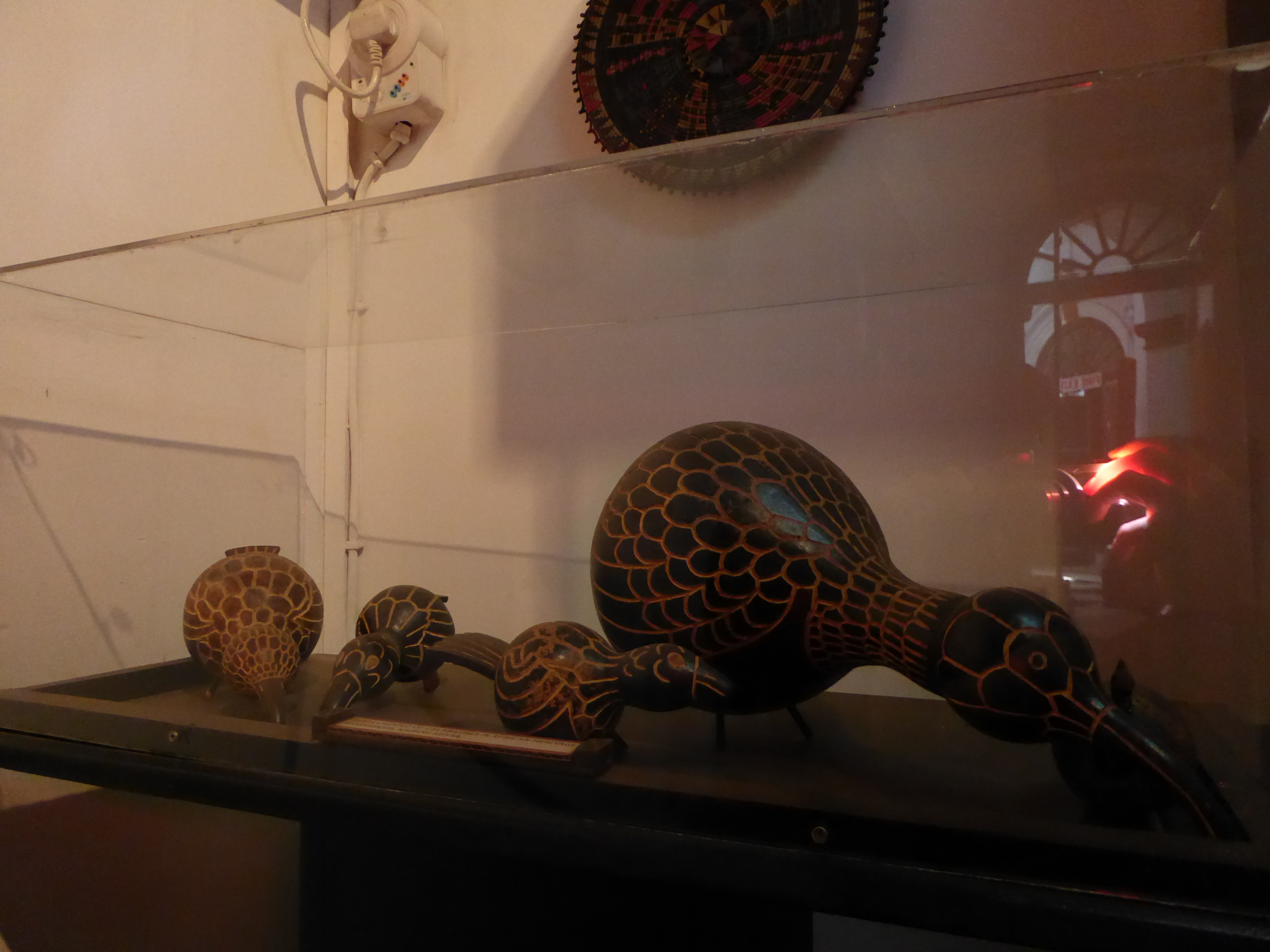
Carved gourds

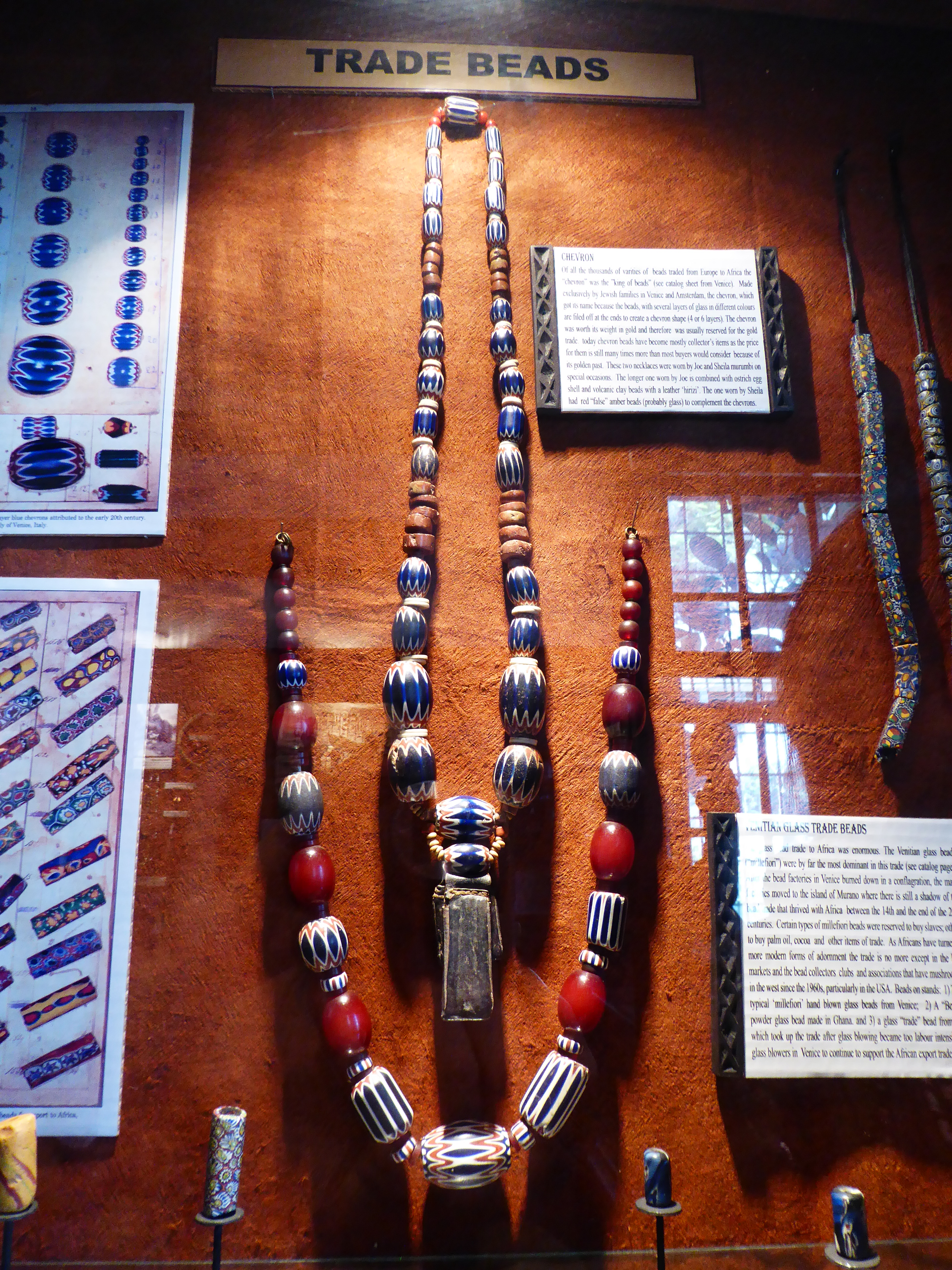
Trade beads
