= Kitale =

- Municipality
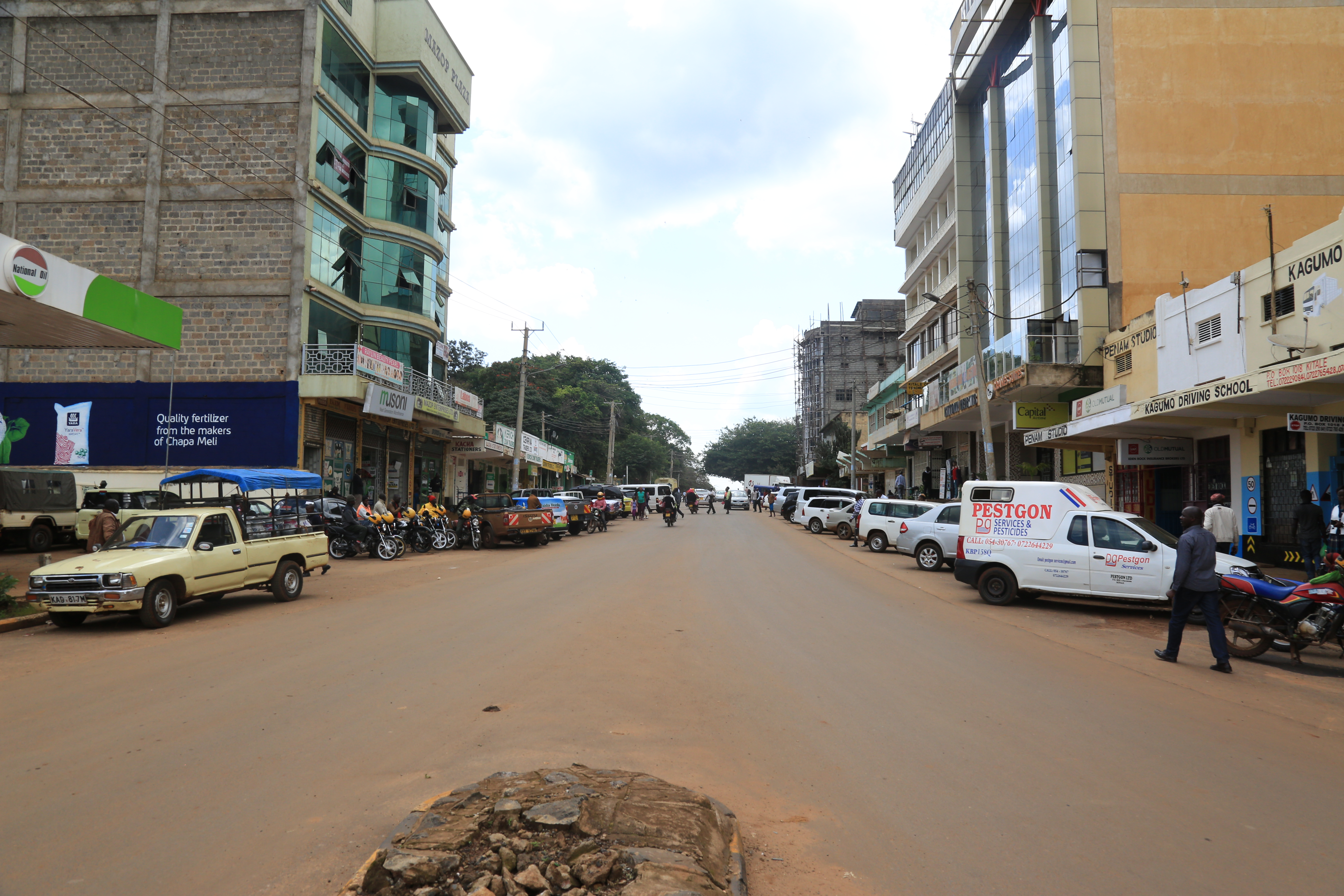
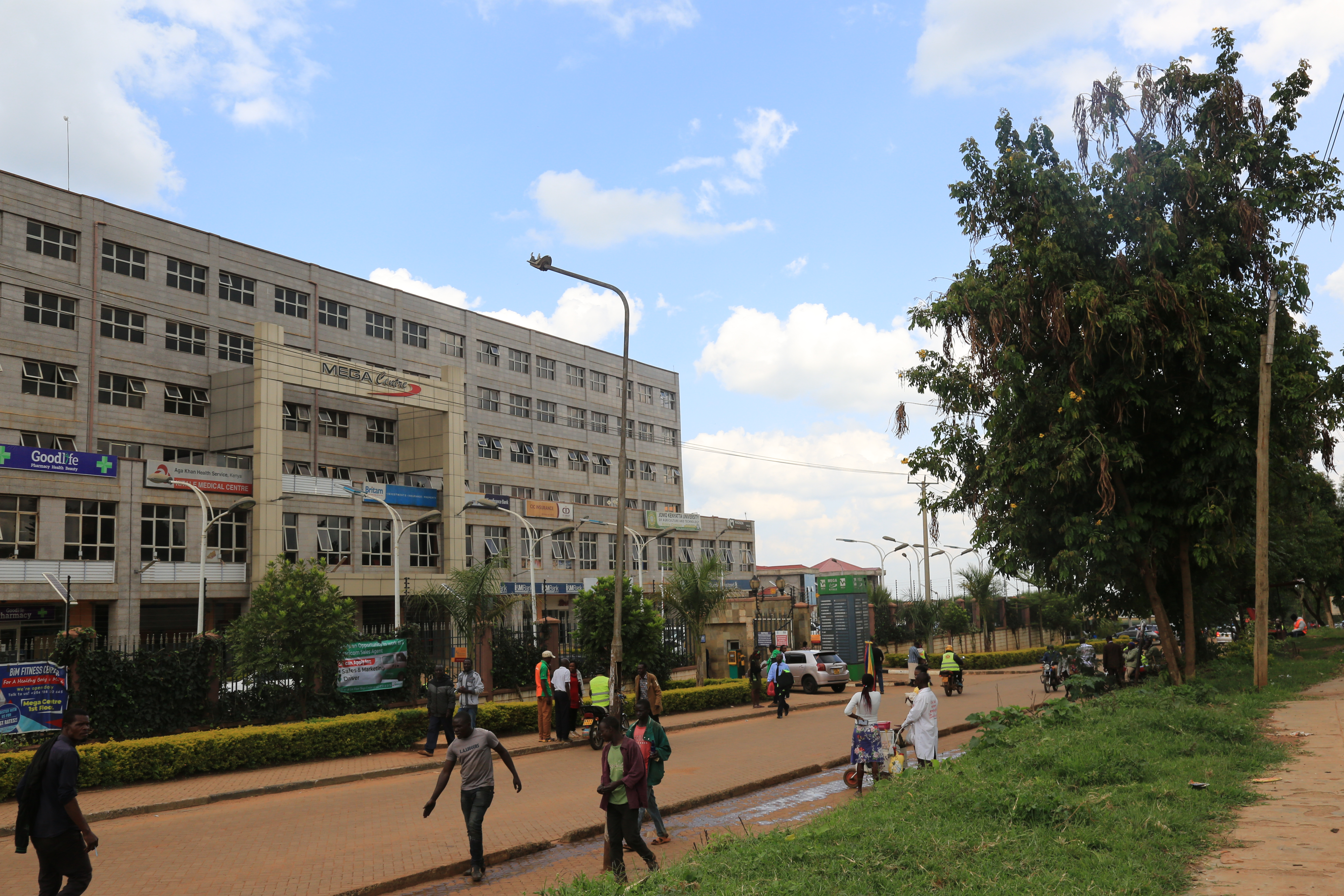
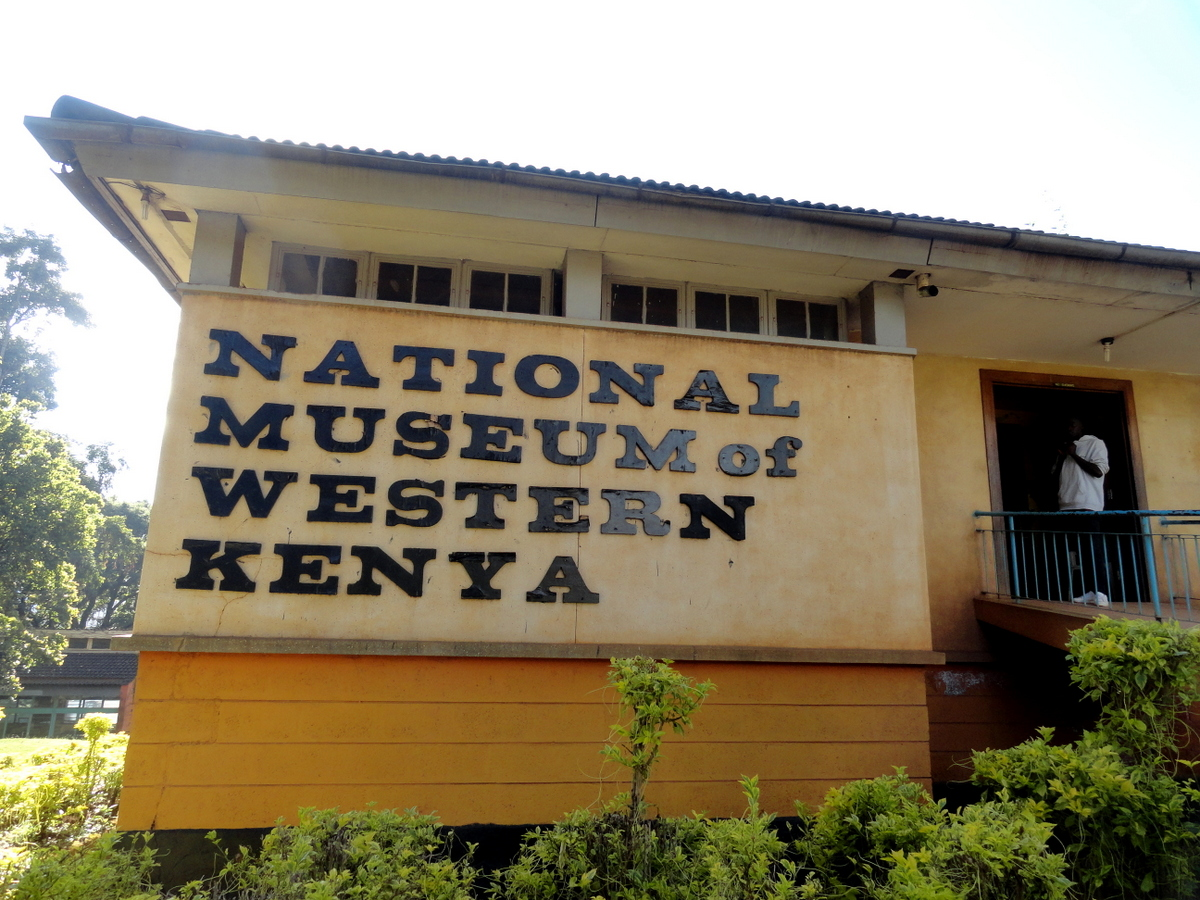
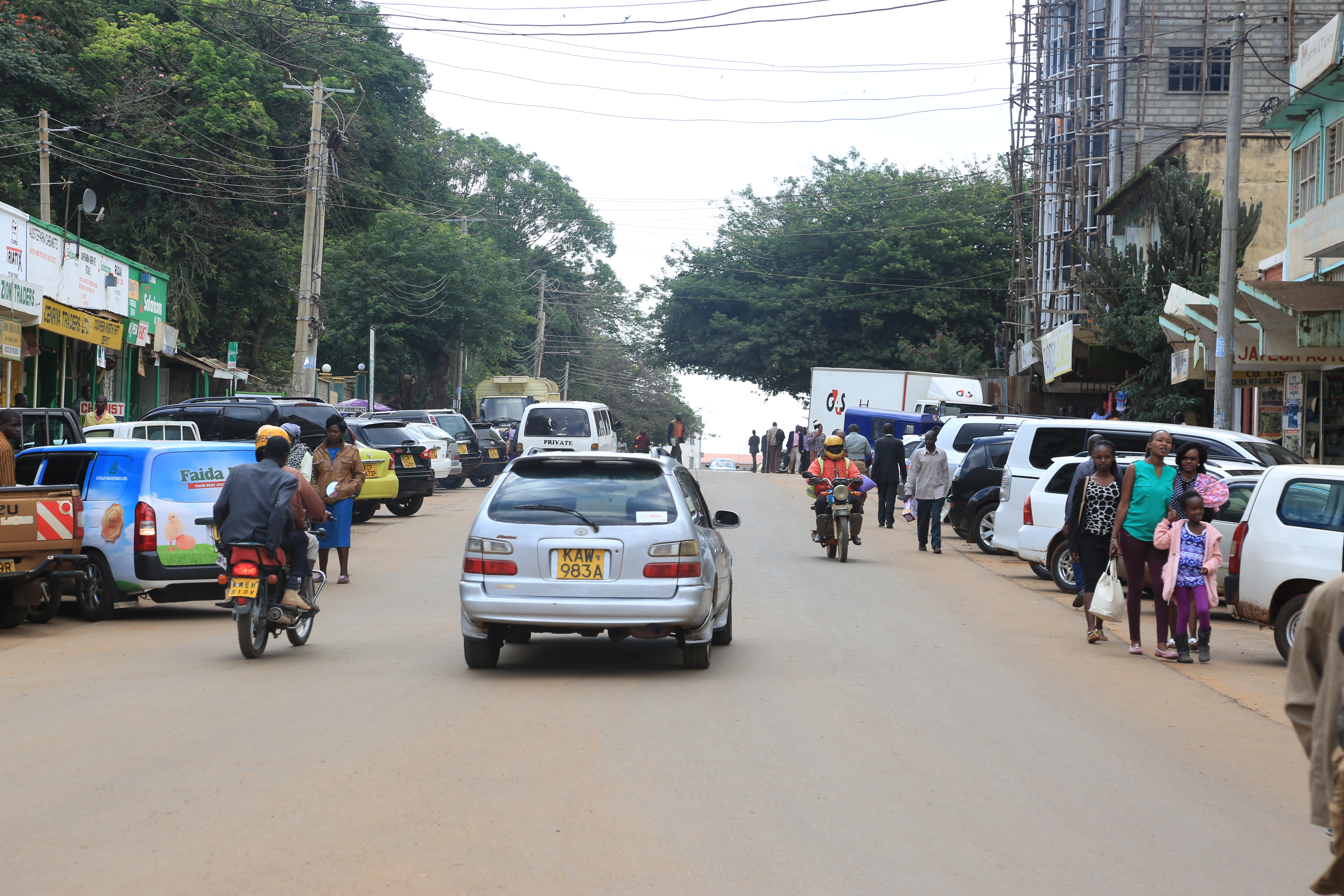
- Downtown Kitale
- Nickname: KTL
- Location in Kenya
- Coordinates: 1°01′N 35°00′E
- Country: Kenya
- County: Trans-Nzoia County
- Elevation: 1,900 m (6,200 ft)

Population (2019)
  - Total: 162174
- Time zone: UTC+3 (EAT)
- Postal code: 30200

Kitale is a town in the north west of Kenya, within the county of Trans Nzoia which was formerly in the former Rift Valley province prior to the creation of the 2010 constitution. The town lies between Mount Elgon and the Cherang'any Hills. It has an elevation of around 1900 metres (6200 ft). Its population was 162,174 as of 2019. It is the location of Kitale Airport.

The National Museum of Western Kenya in Kitale is a natural history museum.

== Location ==
Kitale lies between Mount Elgon and Cherang'any Hills is 72.3 km (44.9 mi) by road north west of Eldoret.

== History ==
In 1920, Arthur Champion, the colonial district commissioner, established a new administrative centre in the Trans Nzoia region, at the future site of the township of Kitale.

In 1930, locusts caused extensive damage to crops.

== Places of Interest ==
- Kitale Museum
- Kitale Showground

== Neighborhoods ==
Kitale is subdivided into 8 Wards totaling 167 (km²) of area.

Ward	Area (km²)
Tuwan	5
Matisi	38
Sirende	14
Waitaluk	18
Bidil	32
Hospital	34
Kinyoro	19
Kapomboi	7

== Climate ==
Kitale has a temperate oceanic climate (Köppen climate classification Cfb) very closely bordering on Cwb.

Climate data for Kitale (1961–1990, extremes 1921–present)
Month	Jan	Feb	Mar	Apr	May	Jun	Jul	Aug	Sep	Oct	Nov	Dec	Year
Record high °C (°F)	36.0 (96.8)	35.2 (95.4)	37.8 (100.0)	33.0 (91.4)	33.3 (91.9)	29.2 (84.6)	27.8 (82.0)	30.0 (86.0)	29.8 (85.6)	29.8 (85.6)	33.0 (91.4)	33.6 (92.5)	37.8 (100.0)
Mean daily maximum °C (°F)	27.0 (80.6)	27.7 (81.9)	27.5 (81.5)	25.8 (78.4)	24.8 (76.6)	24.1 (75.4)	23.3 (73.9)	23.7 (74.7)	24.8 (76.6)	25.1 (77.2)	24.9 (76.8)	25.7 (78.3)	25.4 (77.7)
Daily mean °C (°F)	18.8 (65.8)	19.5 (67.1)	19.8 (67.6)	19.3 (66.7)	18.7 (65.7)	17.9 (64.2)	17.4 (63.3)	17.5 (63.5)	17.9 (64.2)	18.3 (64.9)	18.1 (64.6)	18.1 (64.6)	18.4 (65.1)
Mean daily minimum °C (°F)	10.5 (50.9)	11.4 (52.5)	12.0 (53.6)	12.9 (55.2)	12.6 (54.7)	11.7 (53.1)	11.6 (52.9)	11.3 (52.3)	11.0 (51.8)	11.5 (52.7)	11.3 (52.3)	10.5 (50.9)	11.5 (52.7)
Record low °C (°F)	6.0 (42.8)	6.0 (42.8)	7.0 (44.6)	7.4 (45.3)	7.3 (45.1)	7.0 (44.6)	8.0 (46.4)	6.5 (43.7)	7.0 (44.6)	7.0 (44.6)	5.0 (41.0)	5.8 (42.4)	5.0 (41.0)
Average precipitation mm (inches)	20.4 (0.80)	52.2 (2.06)	102.5 (4.04)	190.3 (7.49)	198.4 (7.81)	101.1 (3.98)	123.3 (4.85)	150.9 (5.94)	102.8 (4.05)	91.5 (3.60)	90.9 (3.58)	34.8 (1.37)	1,259.1 (49.57)
Average precipitation days (≥ 1.0 mm)	8	13	14	13	17	15	13	14	13	7	5	5	137
Average relative humidity (%)	50	52	54	66	70	70	73	72	67	63	63	56	63
Mean monthly sunshine hours	257.3	218.4	226.3	195.0	210.8	207.0	192.2	201.5	210.0	223.2	207.0	254.2	2,602.9
Mean daily sunshine hours	8.3	7.8	7.3	6.5	6.8	6.9	6.2	6.5	7.0	7.2	6.9	8.2	7.1
Source 1: NOAA
Source 2: Deutscher Wetterdienst (humidity, 1961–1990), Meteo Climat (record highs and lows)
