= Malindi Museum =

History museum in Malindi, Kenya

Malindi Museum Heritage Complex
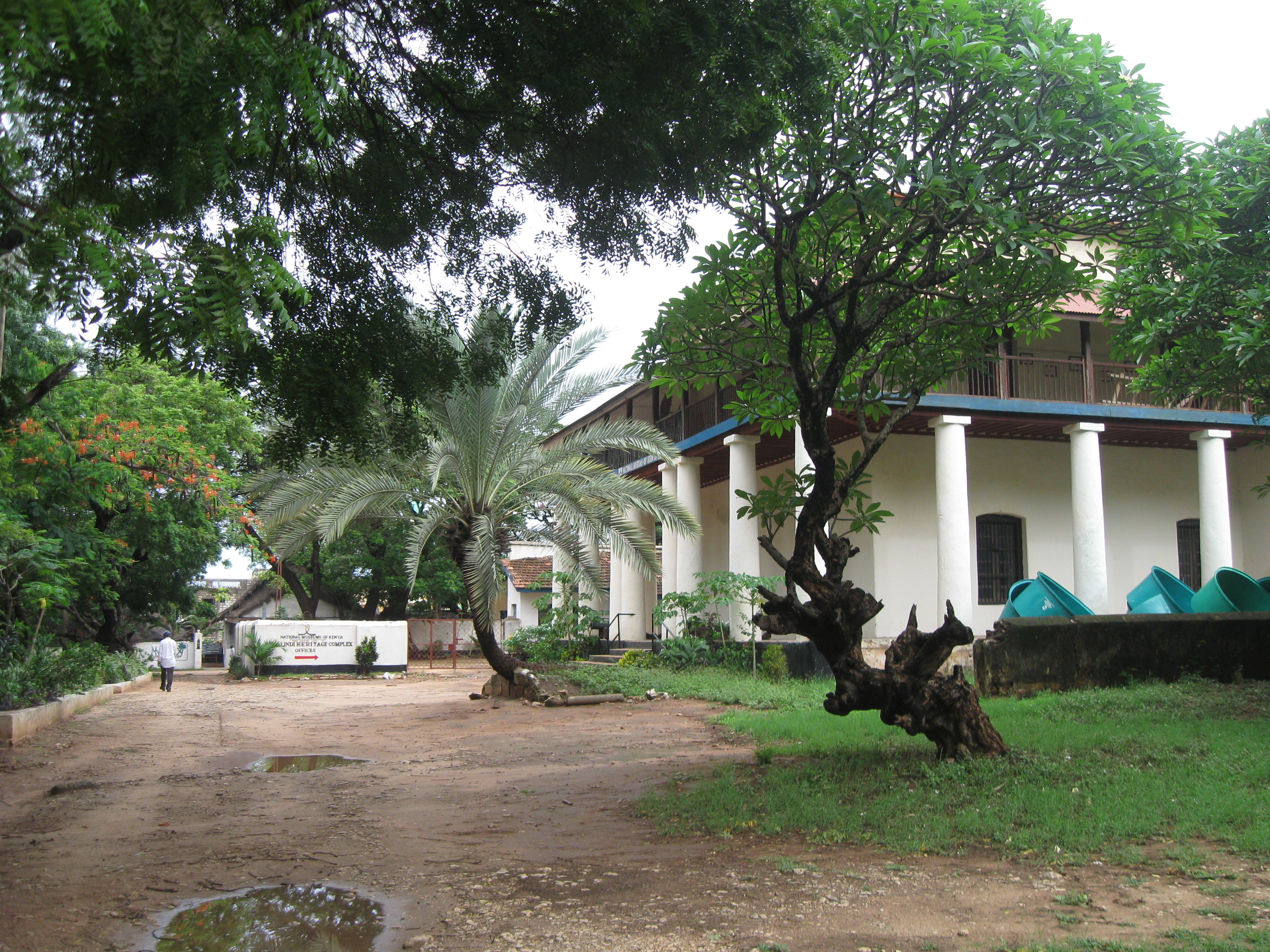
- Established: May 10, 2004; 22 years ago
- Coordinates: 3.215922°S 40.121813°E
- Visitors: 20,990 (2014)
- Owner: National Museums of Kenya

Malindi Museum is a museum located in Malindi, Kenya. It has control over four main heritage sites: The Vasco da Gama Pillar, The Portuguese Chapel, The House of Columns and The Heritage Complex museum.

== History ==
In 1991 the Malindi Museum Society was formed to support the policy of the National Museums of Kenya to acquire a historic building in Malindi that could be turned into a museum. Malindi's first museum building was opened in 2004, located in a two story building dating from 1891 known as The House of Columns. The building was constructed by Adulhussein Gulamhussein. The Bohra community sold the building for 2,000 English pounds. The building operated as an Indian trading center since its establishment in 1891. The building that houses the museum was used as Malindi's first native hospital. On the east facade there is a colonnade featuring five round pillars. The building served as a hospital and headquarters of the Department of Fisheries. In 1991, it was declared a national monument. In 1999 the House of Columns was transferred to the National Museum of Kenya and a restoration opened in 2004 as museum.

In 2013 Malindi Museum acquired a second set of buildings: the former offices of the District Commissioner, about 300 metres northwest along Silversand Road. This is now known as Malindi Museum Heritage Complex, the main building of which houses the ethnographic collections. Malindi Museum also has responsibility for two other heritage sites in the town: The Vasco da Gama Pillar and The Portuguese Chapel.

== Collections ==
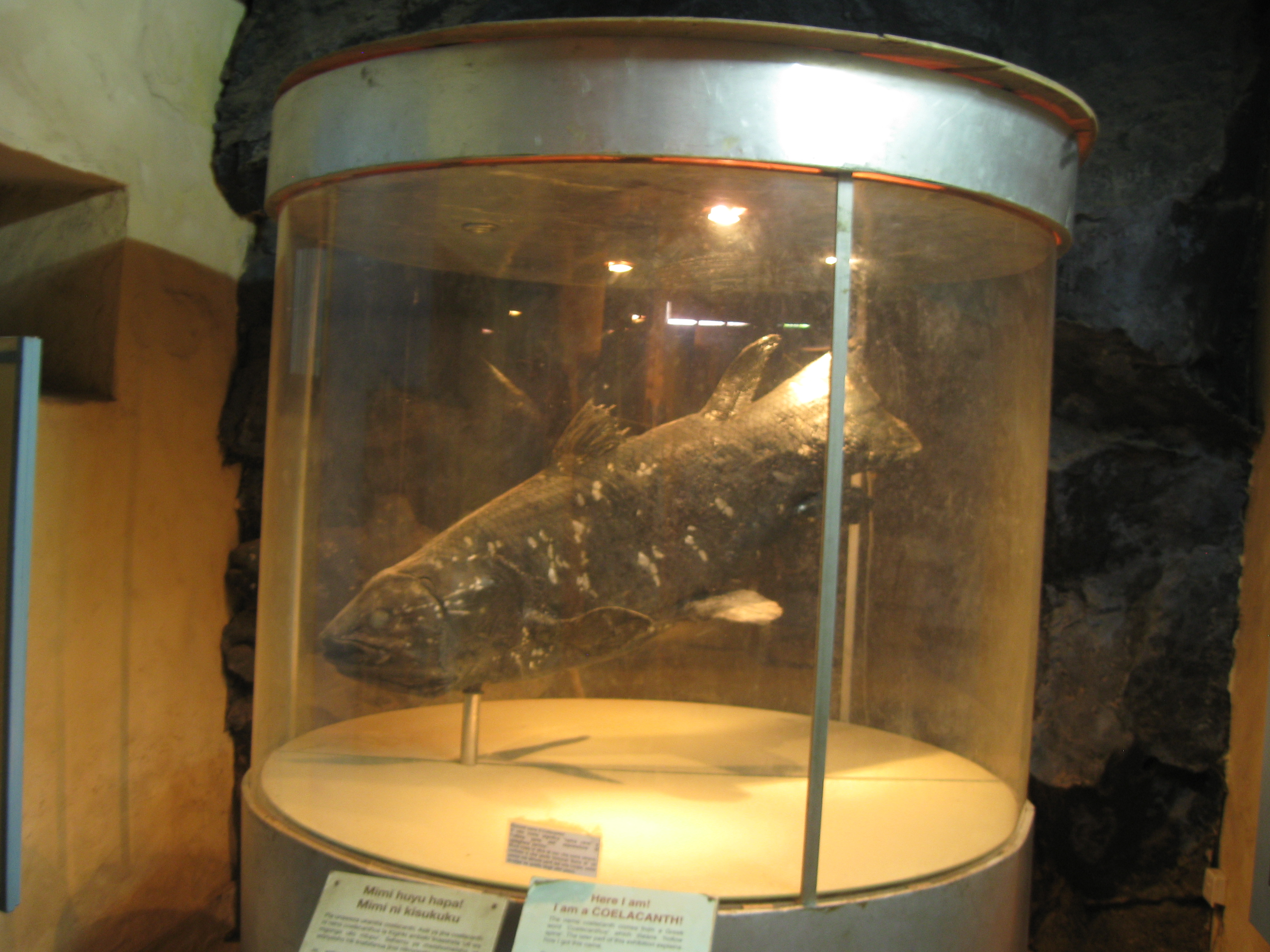
Coelacanth in The House of Columns

The Heritage Complex museum contains various historical artefacts from Malindi. The museum has exhibits containing traditional objects such as musical instruments, tools and costumes. On the ethnographic section, the museum contains various artefacts of the Mijikenda peoples who are ethnic groups inhabiting the Kenyan coast, including wooden totems, as well as ancient artifacts that belonged to Arabs who settled in Malindi. In addition, the museum features artefacts from other communities that inhabit the Kenyan coast, as well as objects from the Swahili civilization. The museum features exhibits about fish species and the history of Malindi.

The House of Columns features temporary exhibits including famous Malindi Coelacanth. The museum also contains artifacts related to the explorer Vasco da Gama. The House of Columns has exhibits from the Portuguese period of Kenya's coastal zone, as well as photographs of some of the country's archeological sites. In addition, the museum owns the Webb Memorial Library which has books on the history and culture of the Kenyan coast.

== Access ==
A single ticket currently (2023) covers the four sites under the control of Malindi Museum. These are: The Vasco da Gama Pillar, The Portuguese Chapel, The House of Columns and the Malindi Museum Heritage Complex.

== See also ==
- List of museums in Kenya
