= House of Columns, Malindi =

Museum in Malindi, Kilifi County, Kenya

House of Columns
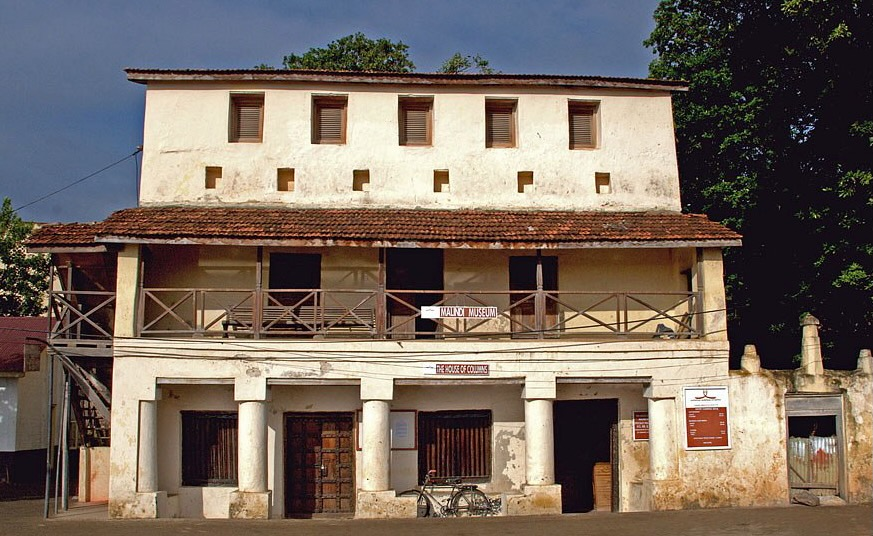

Location
- Malindi, Kilifi County; Kenya; 3.217891°S 40.124806°E

Information
- Local authority: Municipal Council of Malindi

The House of Columns in Malindi is part of Malindi Museum. It was first opened as the 'Malindi Museum' on May 10 2004. In 2014, Malindi Museum acquired an additional set of buildings: the former offices of the Malindi District Commissioner, 400 metres west along Silversand Road. Since that time, the 'House of Columns' has been known by its old name, while the new buildings are known as the Malindi Heritage Complex.

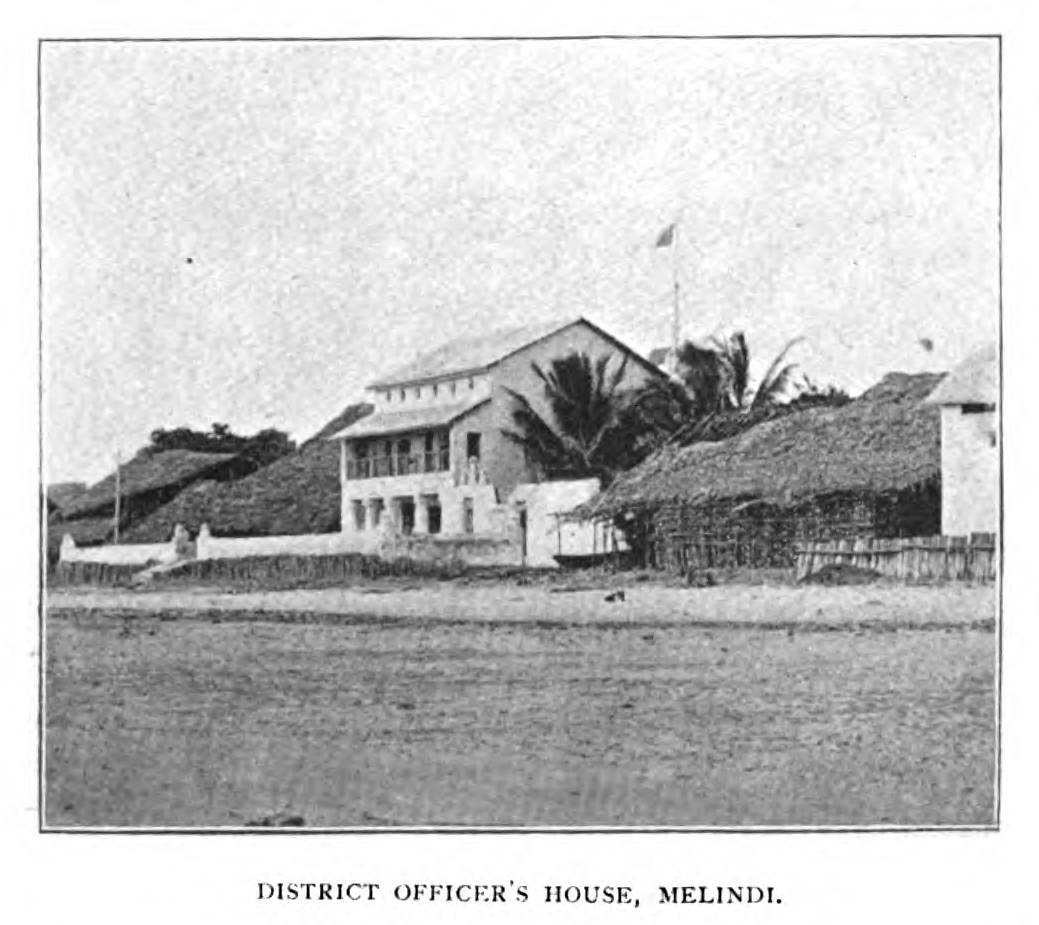
Photograph of the House of Columns, Malindi, 1891

== History ==
=== Early colonial period ===
The House of Columns dates from the late nineteenth century, taking its name from the thick columns at its front, supporting the upper floors. The building is known to predate 1891, in which year it was photographed by William Walter Augustine Fitzgerald from the deck of the Henry Wright: a coastal steamer belonging the Imperial British East Africa Company. At that time the house was occupied by the officer in charge of Malindi District, James Bell Smith. Bell Smith hosted Fitzgerald in the house for several days in July 1891 while Fitzgerald explored Malindi, visiting among other things the Vasco da Gama pillar.

=== Murder ===
As is clear from Fitzgerald's photograph, the house then directly fronted the beach, but land reclamation means it now stands further back. On Friday 31 August 1894 Bell Smith was shot whilst smoking on the verandah in the evening, and died the following day. He was buried in the grounds of the Portuguese Chapel, Malindi. An illustration of the execution by firing squad of his murderer was published in The Graphic on 8 December 1894. This shows the House of Columns in the background, the killer having been brought back to the site of his crime for punishment. All that is known about the building before 1891 is that it had been used by Adul Hussein Gulam Hussein & Co., for whom it served as a shop and a house

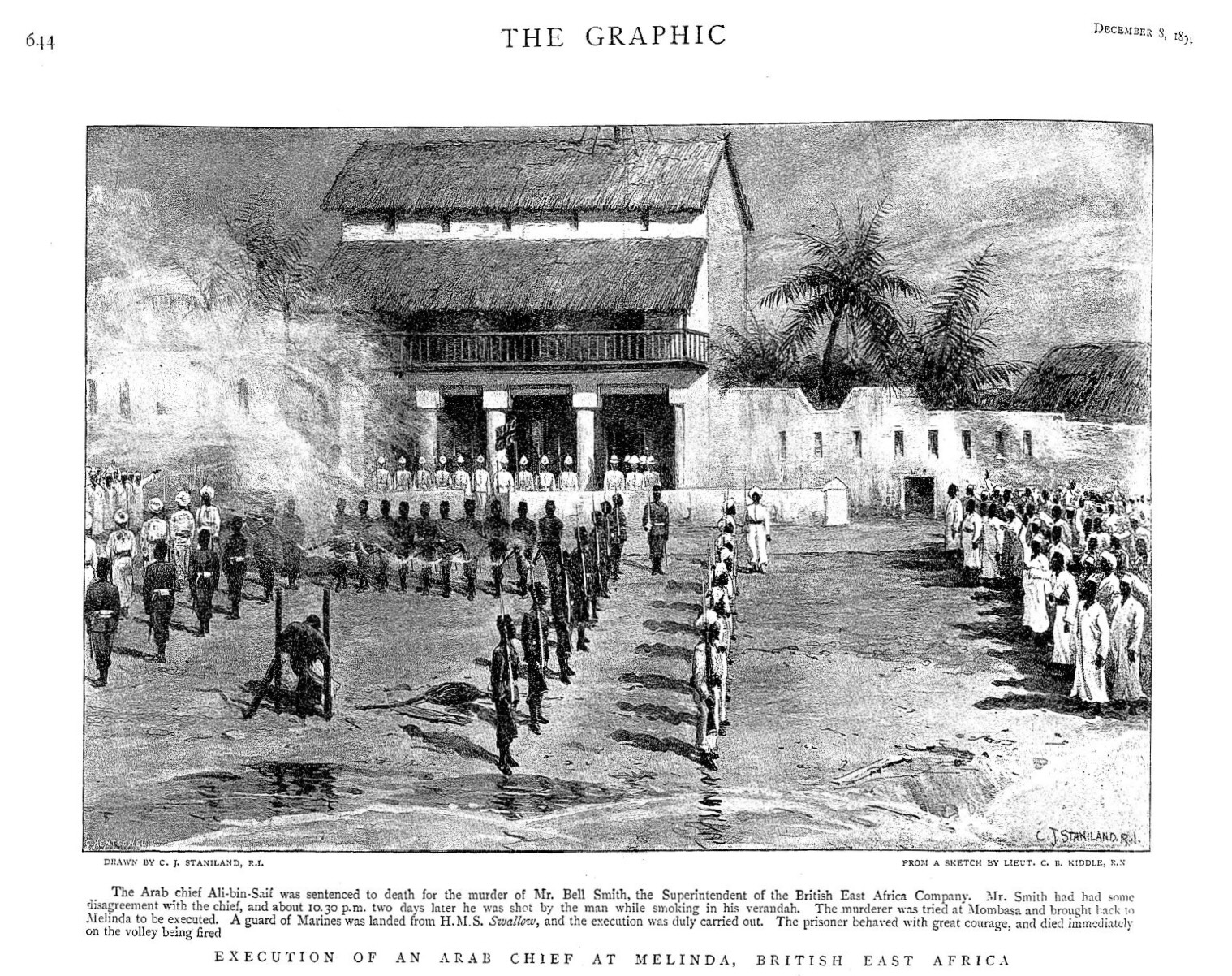
Execution in front of the House of Columns, 1894

=== Later uses ===
The House of Columns later served as the first hospital for Malindi, with an operating theatre on the first floor. When Malindi District Hospital was built in 1952, the House of Columns became Malindi's first fisheries office. It was bought for the service by Thomas Allfree from the Bohra community for £2,000. The Bohra were a close knit Islamic community/sect that, in East Africa, practiced chiefly as businessmen and traders. The purchase was funded from a grant recently made to the Marine Fisheries Department, and at the cost of surrendering an antique door then in the house, which was the price of overlooking Allfree's unorthodox arrangements to acquire the building. Allfree was at that time the Provincial Fisheries Officer in Malindi. He purchased the building first, and only then asked for official permission. Allfree describes the house as having walls two foot thick, made of plaster over lime and lumps of coral. When the Fisheries Department moved out, the building housed first the Game Department and then the Wildlife Conservation and Management Department. This was subsumed into the Kenya Wildlife Service, when it was created in 1989, under the directorship of Dr Richard Leakey. The building was used by Range Management/ Livestock Development officers for some years until Leakey agreed that it should be handed over to the National Museums of Kenya. The building was renovated in 2003 with funding from the German government and the Malindi community. The House of Columns was opened as Malindi's first museum on 10 May 2004.

== Access ==
As of 2023 the House of Columns houses an exhibition space on its ground floor, focusing on fisheries and, in particular, a coelacanth caught off the coast of Malindi in 2002. The upper floors house the Webb Memorial Library and the museum's Resource Centre.

Access to the House of Columns is subject to an entry ticket. A single ticket currently covers the four sites under the control of Malindi Museum. These are: the Vasco da Gama Pillar, the Portuguese Chapel, the House of Columns and the Heritage Complex museum.

It is possible to take a tour of the interior of the House of Columns via Google Street View.
