= Portuguese Chapel, Malindi =

Portuguese Chapel
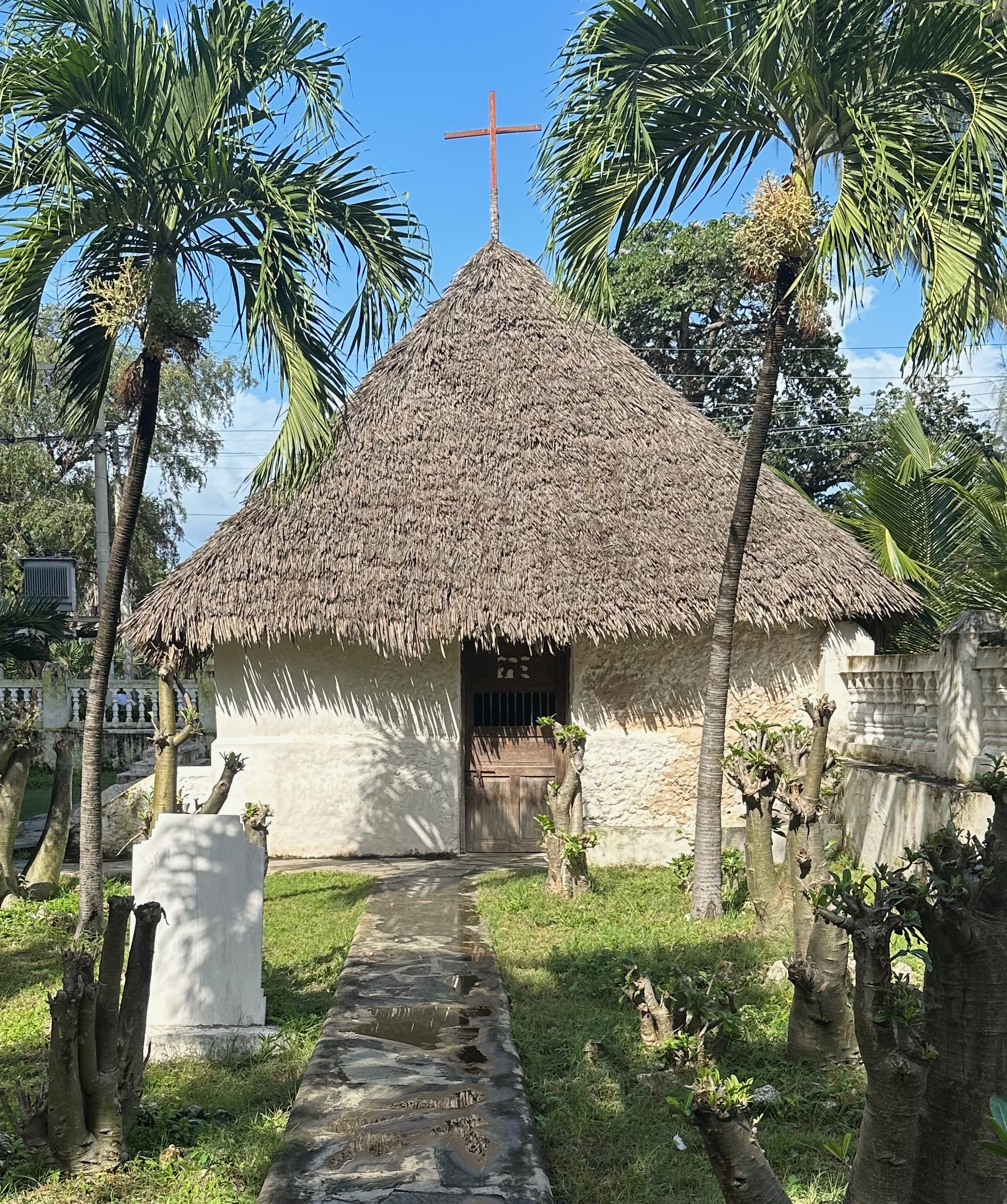

Location
- Malindi, Kilifi County; Kenya; 3.2213758°S 40.1261544°E

Information
- Local authority: Municipal Council of Malindi

The Portuguese Chapel in Malindi, Kenya, was built c.1502 by the residents of the Portuguese factory established by Vasco da Gama during his second voyage to India. It is the first Christian place of worship to be built in East Africa.

== History ==
The Portuguese presence in Malindi began with the arrival of Vasco da Gama in 1498. On his second voyage to India, he left a group of soldiers in Malindi to establish an entrepôt. From 1509 to 1593 the factory was Portugal's chief in the region, under an official described as 'Captain of the Malindi coast'. This included store houses, barracks, residences and offices, besides the chapel. The settlement may have housed around sixty Christians. While the Chapel is small, this may have been intentional. When it was built, Islamic worship was paramount and there were 17 Mosques in the town. By 1542, however, only three mosques were said to be in use.

In 1542, the Catholic Missionary Francis Xavier (later St. Francis Xavier), while en-route to Goa, landed in Malindi to bury a seaman in the Chapel graveyard, remaining in Melindi for a few days before continuing his journey. St. Francis is firmly associated with the Chapel and Catholics in Malindi hold Mass there during Easter and on the first Sunday of December to celebrate the Feast of St. Francis Xavier, which falls on 3 December. The modern devotional image of Francis Xavier on the altar references Malindi's continuing connection with the saint.

The Chapel endured for nearly a century until the Portuguese and the sultan of Malindi, succeeded in capturing Mombasa in 1589, which the sultan then removed to. The Portuguese decided to make Mombasa their base, which had a better harbour than Malindi and was easier to defend. The Portuguese built Fort Jesus in Mombasa in 1593. Mombasa then became Portugal's chief base on the East African coast for the next century. The Portuguese abandoned Malindi itself, along with its chapel.

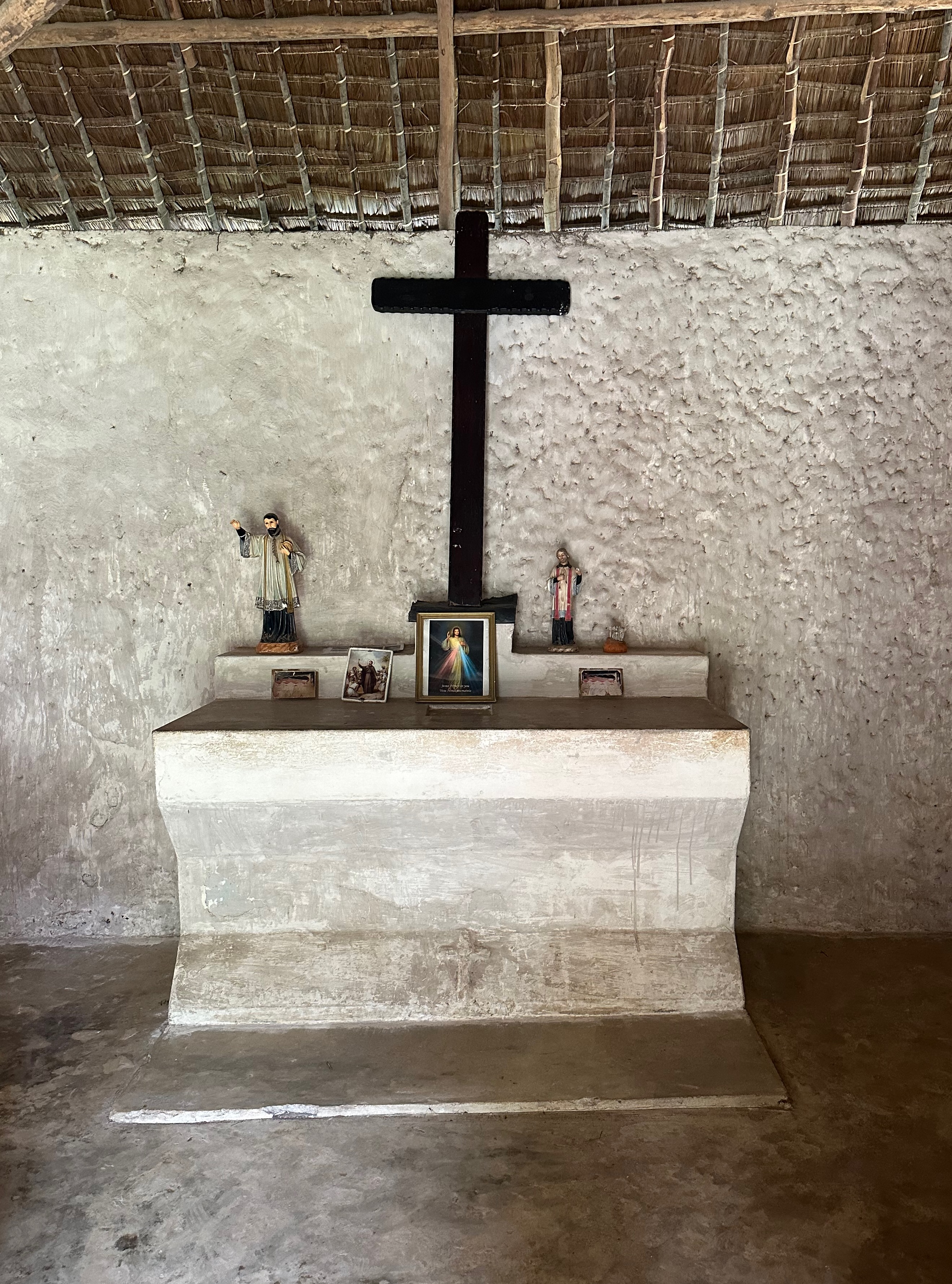
Portuguese Chapel Malindi altar

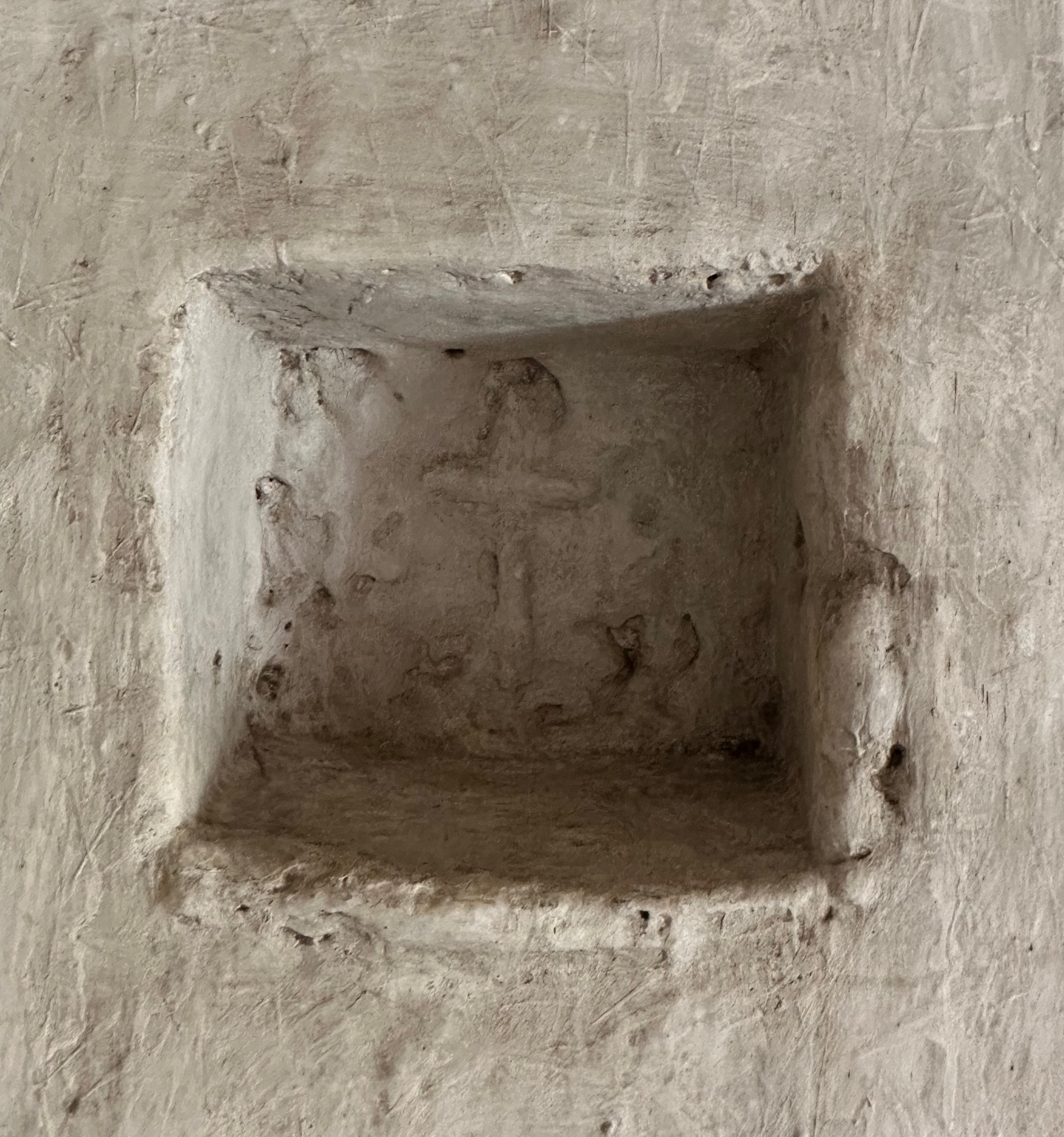
Niche in the south wall of the Portuguese Chapel in Malindi

The most prominent internal feature of the chapel is the stone altar. As was the norm until Vatican II, the priest celebrated mass leading the congregation in prayer, facing the liturgical East, in expectation of the risen Christ. Thus, the altar is placed against a wall. The square central depression in the altar table was probably intended for an Altar stone. This would have been a small, portable, stone slab that incorporated an integral, man-made depression in which the relic of a saint, such as a sliver of bone, had been sealed. It need not have been a permanent fixture in the altar itself, but such a stone, with its relic, was a requisite for the celebration of Mass. Another feature of note is the niche inset on the south wall. This was undoubtedly intended for liturgical use, since it incorporates a simple cross sculpted on its rear wall. A lavabo, a place for the ritual washing of the priest’s hands during mass, was its most likely purpose, although other uses are possible.

After the Portuguese departed in 1593, the history of the chapel is obscure. During the 17th and 18th centuries, Malindi declined and nearly disappeared, being described as ruined and deserted. The Chapel itself may have been a ruin at various times and no history can be ascribed to it for nearly 300 years. It is unclear how much of the current fabric is original. James Kirkman, an archaeologist working in the mid-twentieth century, refers only to the 'remains' of the chapel, but writes that a painting of the crucifixion was then still faintly visible on an interior wall at the south-west corner of the chapel. The traditional makuti roof (palm leaf thatch) is an obvious and necessary modern restoration.

The graveyard began to be used again when James Bell Smith was buried there following his murder on 1 September 1894. Bell Smith was the first resident administrator for the Imperial British East Africa Company which occupied Malindi between 1890 and 1895. Thereafter, the graveyard was used for burials occasionally until 1958. One such late burial of a European followed an accident at sea. Several are infant burials. Several gravestones appear to be of stock design, and probably later than the burial they mark, whereas others, including that of Sir Pyers Edward Joseph Mostyn of Talacre, bt. (d. 1955) are clearly bespoke. This graveyard was once shaded by large trees and may have been larger than is seen today. It is recorded that a Baobab tree was planted on the Portuguese graveyard. This may be the large tree opposite the chapel, which was once in the Chapel compound.

This Chapel is said to be the oldest Christian church in East Africa and was declared a gazetted monument in 1935. In 1993 the Kenyan branch of Society of Jesuits provided funds to the newly formed Malindi Museum Society to assist National Museums of Kenya to restore the chapel and graveyard. Later the local branch of the Kenya Horticultural Society restored the garden. The Chapel is now cared for and maintained by the National Museums of Kenya assisted by the Malindi Museum Society and Kenya Horticultural Society.

Access to the chapel is subject to an entry ticket. A single ticket currently covers the four sites under the control of Malindi Museum. These are: the Vasco da Gama Pillar, the Portuguese Chapel, the House of Columns and the Heritage Complex museum.
