= Malindi Museum Heritage Complex =

Malindi Heritage Complex Museum
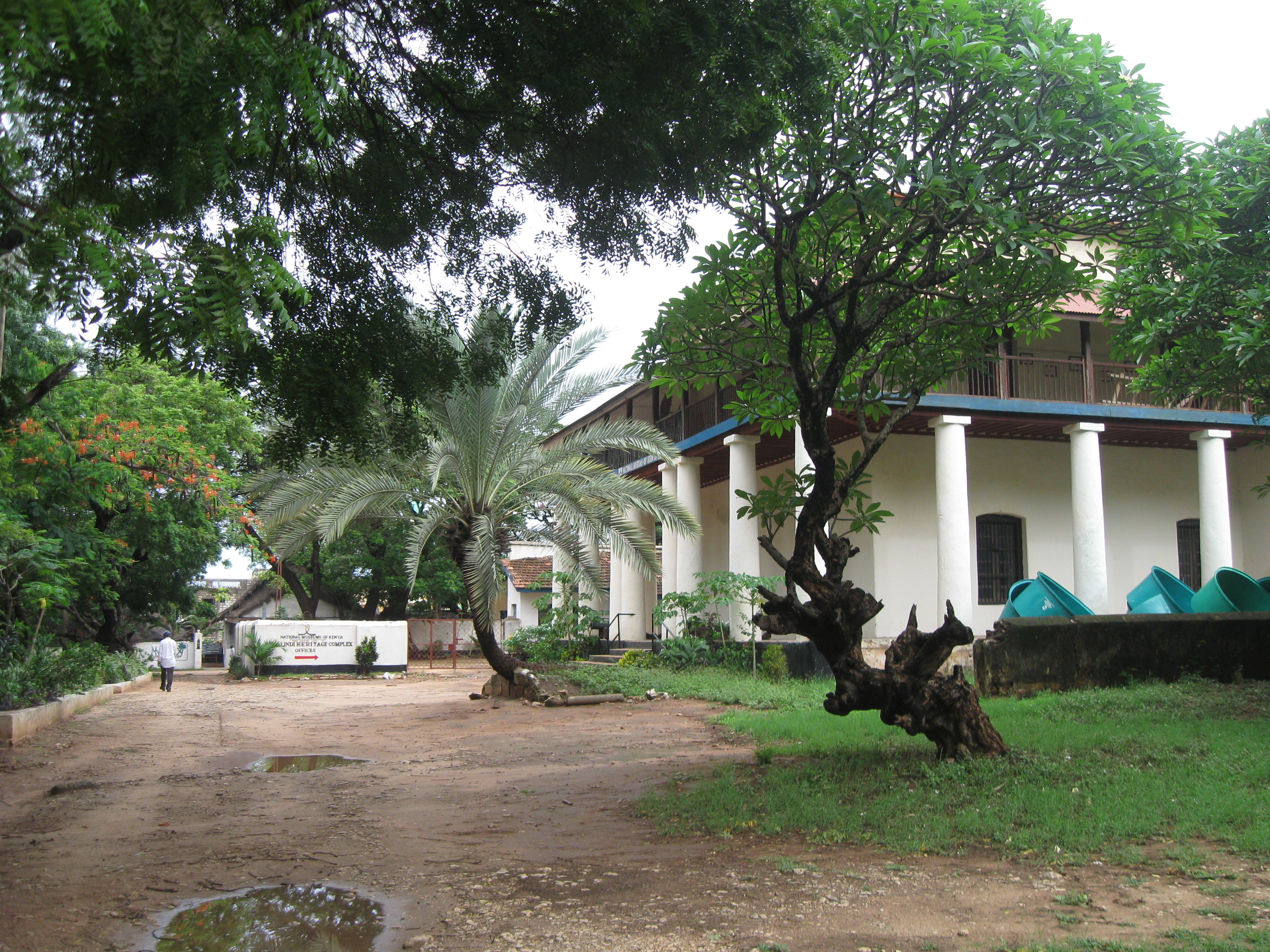

Location
- Malindi, Kilifi County; Kenya; 3.216002°S 40.121625°E

Information
- Local authority: Municipal Council of Malindi

The Malindi Museum Heritage Complex consists of a group of buildings occupied by Malindi Museum in Kenya. The main building on the site is a historic building used for public displays that focus on the cultures of the past and present people of the coastal region. The rooms on the ground floor contain exhibitions dedicated to Swahili culture, as well as underwater cultural heritage. Upstairs are exhibitions on the Mijikenda and Taita / Dawida people.

== History of the Building ==
The main building in the complex was constructed in early 1890s to serve as the District Collector's Office for the Imperial British East Africa Company. Mr. James Bell-Smith, an employee of the company, was responsible for the building work.

Under British rule, the house was also known as the Boma, or Kwa Balozi (Consul's House). It had offices on the ground floor and living space upstairs for the District Collectors.

When Kenya became independent in 1963, the British-appointed District Officer was replaced by Sheikh Azzan Bin Rashid, who had previously served as the Liwali of the Sultan of Zanzibar. In November 1966 Malindi became a full District in its own right. The building then became the office of the Malindi District Commissioner

In 1991 the main building was gazetted as a National Monument. In July 2012 the District Commissioner moved to new offices and the building was handed over to the National Museums of Kenya. It was opened to the public as a museum on 24 December 2013.

== The Site ==
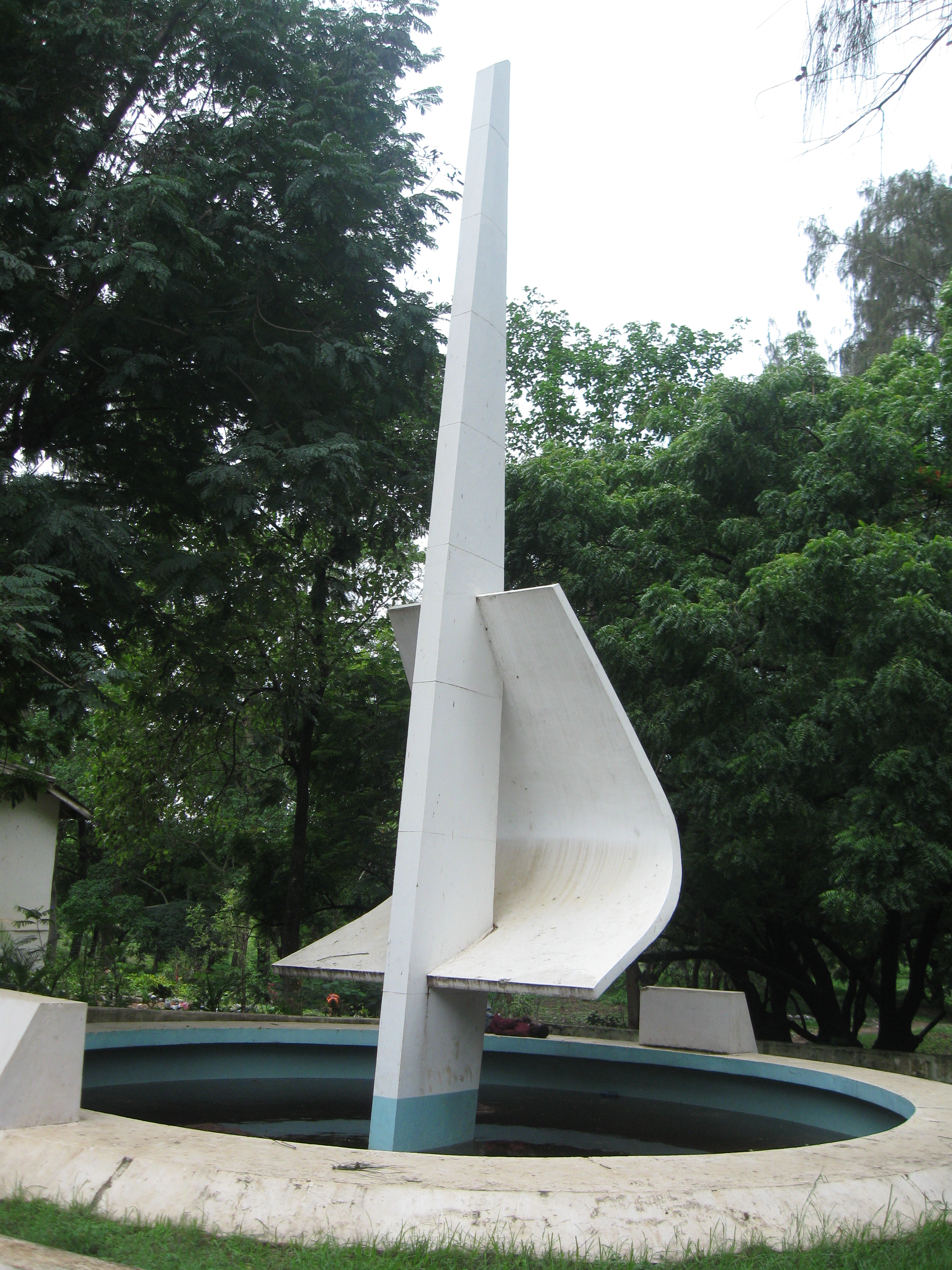
Prince Henry the Navigator Monument, Malindi, est. 1961

The main building originally faced directly on the ocean, with steps leading down to the beach. Land reclamation since that time means that it is now fronted by parkland and the house is about 200 metres from the beach.

Apart from the main house, the complex includes the office of the director of the museum. The old District Officer's Cottage is currently occupied by a bar and restaurant.

During the colonial period four decorative cannons were mounted around the main house: three made from iron and one from bronze. The bronze cannon was fired to start the annual Malindi Festival. There was also a bronze bell at the entrance to the building which was rung each day to mark office hours. The bronze cannon and bell have now been removed.

In 1961 a monument dedicated to Prince Henry the Navigator was erected in the grounds, near the street entrance.

== Access ==
Access to the Heritage Complex museum is subject to an entry ticket. A single ticket currently covers the four sites under the control of Malindi Museum. These are: the Vasco da Gama Pillar, the Portuguese Chapel, the House of Columns and the Malindi Heritage Complex Museum.

It is possible to view the interior of the Heritage Complex museum on Google Street View.
