= Sinking of the Christiana Hama =

1991 maritime disaster near Kenya

Coordinates: 3°14′00″S 40°10′00″E

Sinking of the dhow Christiana Hama
- Date: March 2, 1991
- Location: Near Malindi, Kenya
- Cause: Struck a rock, overcrowding
- Outcome: ~150 deaths out of ~700 passengers

The sinking of the dhow Christiana Hama, was a maritime disaster that occurred on the night of March 2, 1991, off the coastal resort town of Malindi, Kenya. The incident involved the small freighter, which was severely overloaded with refugees fleeing the civil war in Somalia.

== Background ==
The Christiana Hama, a dhow, approximately 60 feet (18 m) long, was chartered to transport refugees from Somalia to Kenya. Reports indicated that the boat had departed Kismayo on February 26, with 300 initial passengers, then stopped at the Kenyan island of Lamu to pick up 400 additional passengers, before it foundered several hundred yards from the Kenyan mainland. The boat, carrying an estimated 600–700 passengers at the time of the capsizing, vastly exceeded its safe capacity of 150.

== Aftermath ==
Early reports indicated that at least 100-150 people had drowned. Most of the victims were women and children. Divers from the Kenya Navy, along with local officials, residents, and tourists, undertook rescue efforts to save survivors and recover bodies. Many of the survivors were taken to refugee camps in the Mombasa area.
