= Vasco da Gama Pillar, Malindi =

Monument in Malindi, Kenya

Vasco da Gama Pillar
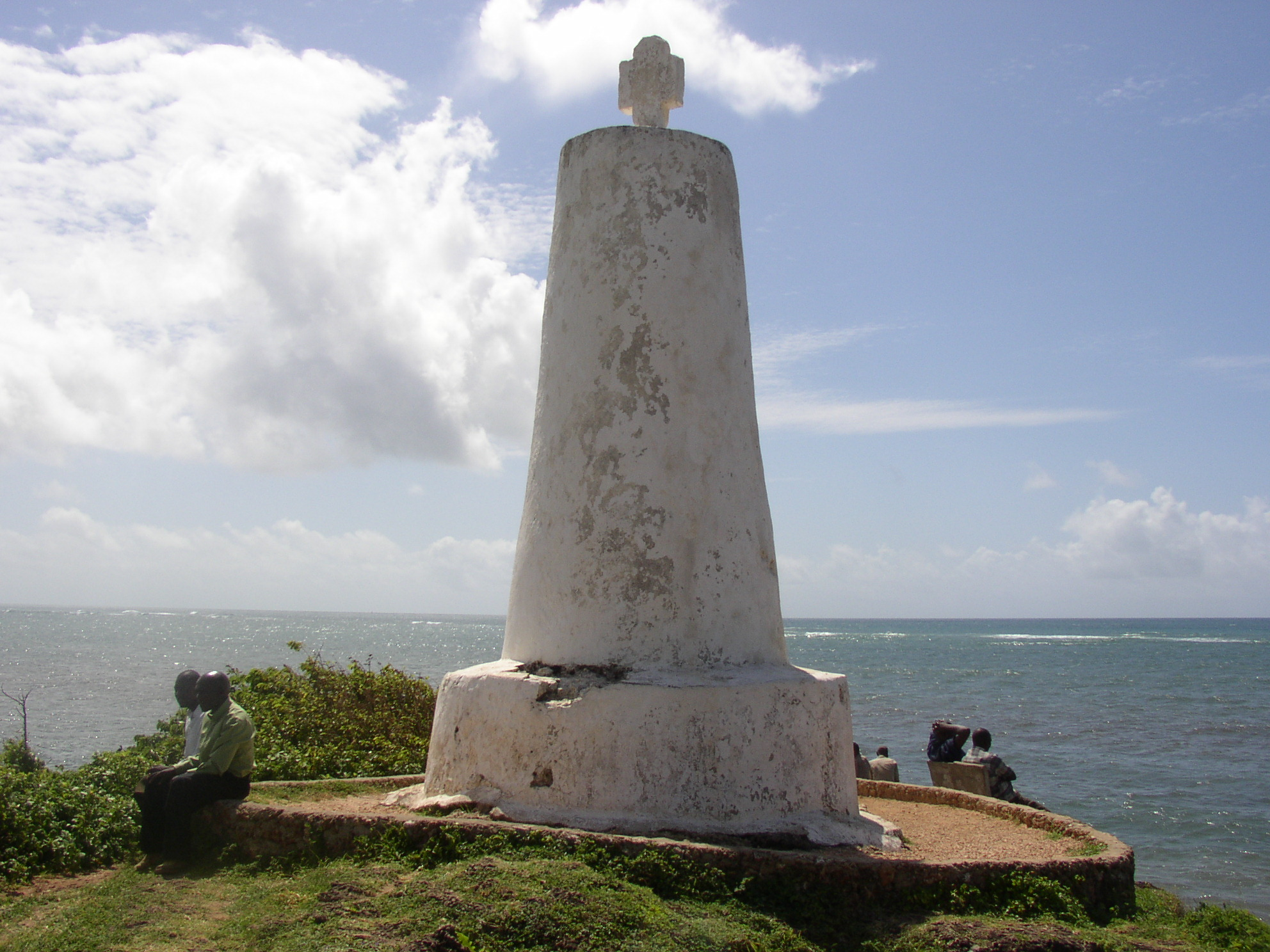
- Interactive map of Vasco da Gama Pillar
- Location: Malindi, Kilifi County, Kenya
- Coordinates: 3.22395°S 40.12965°E
- Completion date: 1498 or 1499

The Vasco da Gama Pillar in Malindi, Kenya, was erected by the Portuguese explorer Vasco da Gama. It was constructed in 1498 or 1499 during his pioneering maritime expedition from Lisbon to India via the Cape of Good Hope (1497–1499).

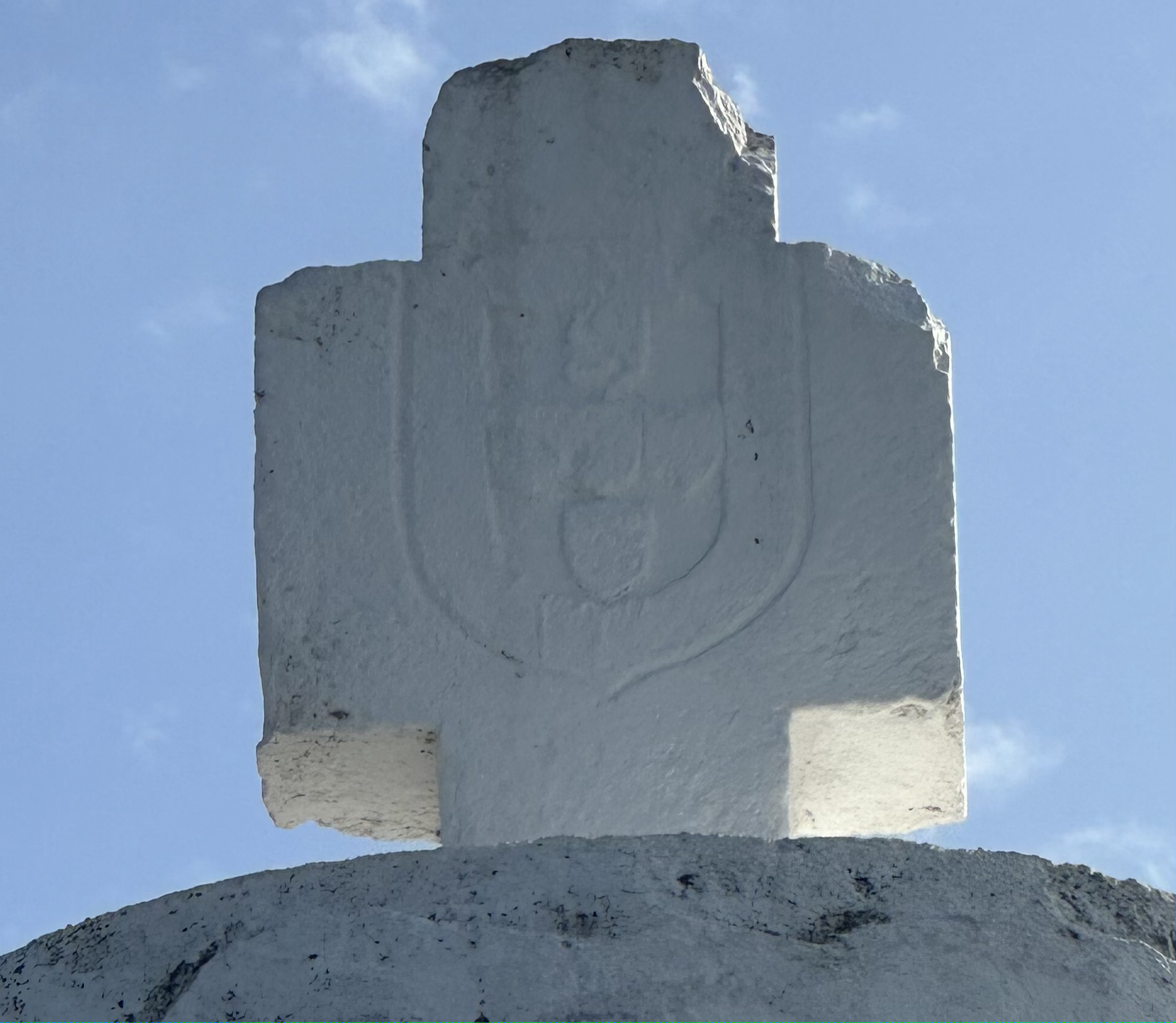
Limestone cross on the Vasco da Gama Pillar displaying the coat of arms of Portugal

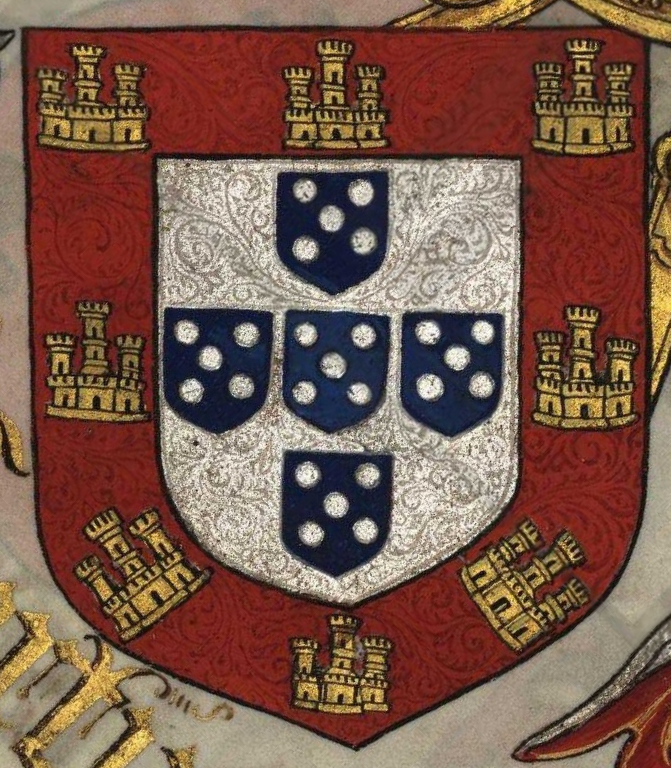
Coat of arms of Portugal in 1498

Vasco da Gama first visited Malindi from 15 to 24 April 1498. He was well received by the sultan of Malindi and was provided with food, fresh water and a pilot to take the fleet across the Indian Ocean to "Calicut" (modern-day Kozhikode). During the voyage, the explorer was allowed to erect a padrão, which included a cross made of Portuguese limestone bearing the coat of arms of Portugal. Most historians suggest that this happened on his return from India in 1499. However, Gaspar Correia, who was one of the earliest sixteenth-century chroniclers, suggests that the cross was erected at the end of Vasco da Gama's first visit to Malindi. Either way, Corrêa provides the most detailed account of the erection of the padrão. Corrêa suggests that the padrão was originally located on a hill "above the port on the left hand side of the city, a place that was very conspicuous, so that the column could be seen from all the sea" (outeiro que hauia sobre o porto á parte da mão esquerda da cidade, lugar muy vistoso, que de todo. o mar se via a coluna). However, the erection of a Christian cross caused discontent among the Sultan's neighbours, obliging him to take it down and put it in store.

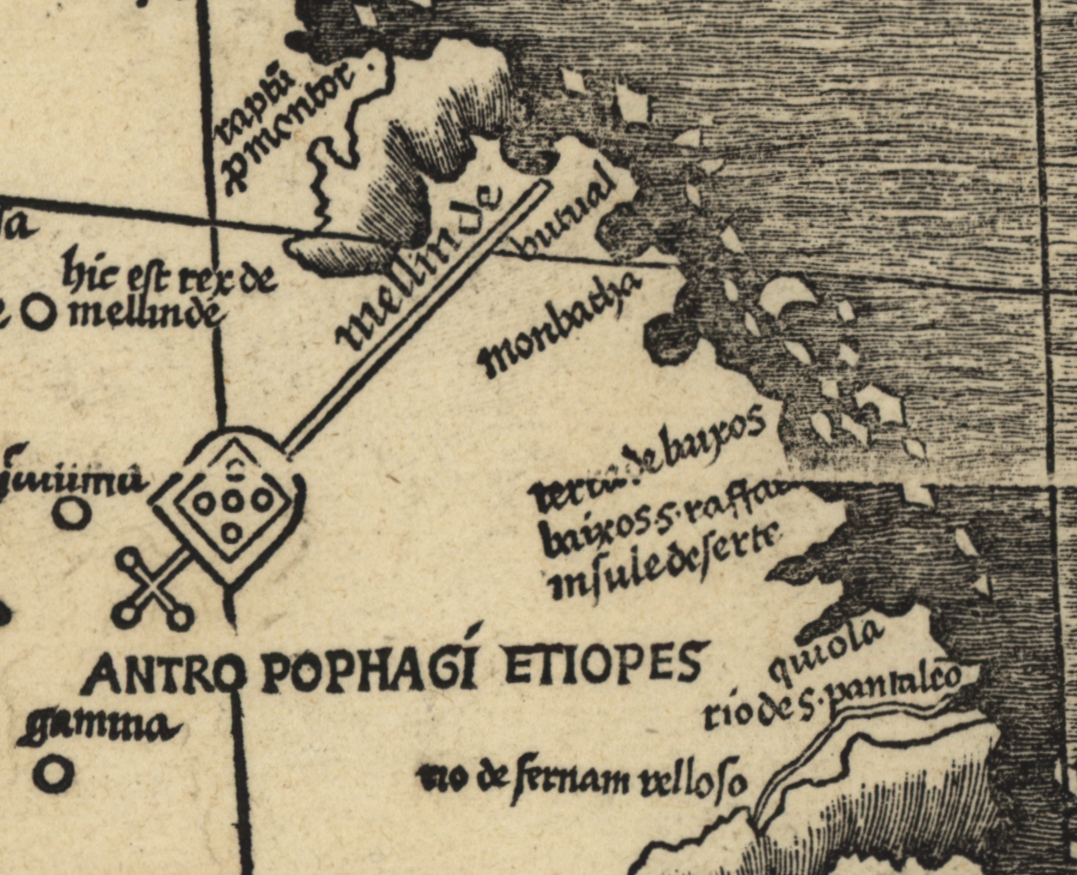
Detail from Martin Waldseemüller's 1507 world map showing the Malindi padrão

Following Vasco da Gama's expedition to India in 1502–1503, a small Portuguese trading post was established in Malindi. By 1509 the factory was Portugal's only base in the region, under an official described as 'Captain of the Malindi coast'. The Sultan of Malindi remained Portugal's chief ally on the East African coast for the rest of the sixteenth century.

The padrão, topped by the cross, was set up at its current site on a low rocky promontory overlooking the ocean. Its location was marked on Martin Waldseemüller's world map of 1507. When Francis Xavier visited Malindi in 1542 he noted: "The Portuguese have erected near the city a large and very handsome stone cross, which is gilt all over. I cannot express to you what joy I felt in looking at it. It seemed like the might of the Cross appearing victorious in the midst of the dominion of the unbelievers." (Junto con esta ciudad hicieron los portugueses una cruz grande de piedra, dorada, muy hermosa. En verla, Dios nuestro Señor sabe cuanta consolación recibimos, conociendo cuan grande es la virtud de la cruz, viéndola así sola y con tanta victoria entre tanta morería.).

The Malindi padrão is the only one of those erected along the African coastline by Portuguese seafarers to have survived in its original settlement. The better-known Cape Cross padrão, for instance, was taken to Germany in the nineteenth century before being returned to Namibia in 2019.

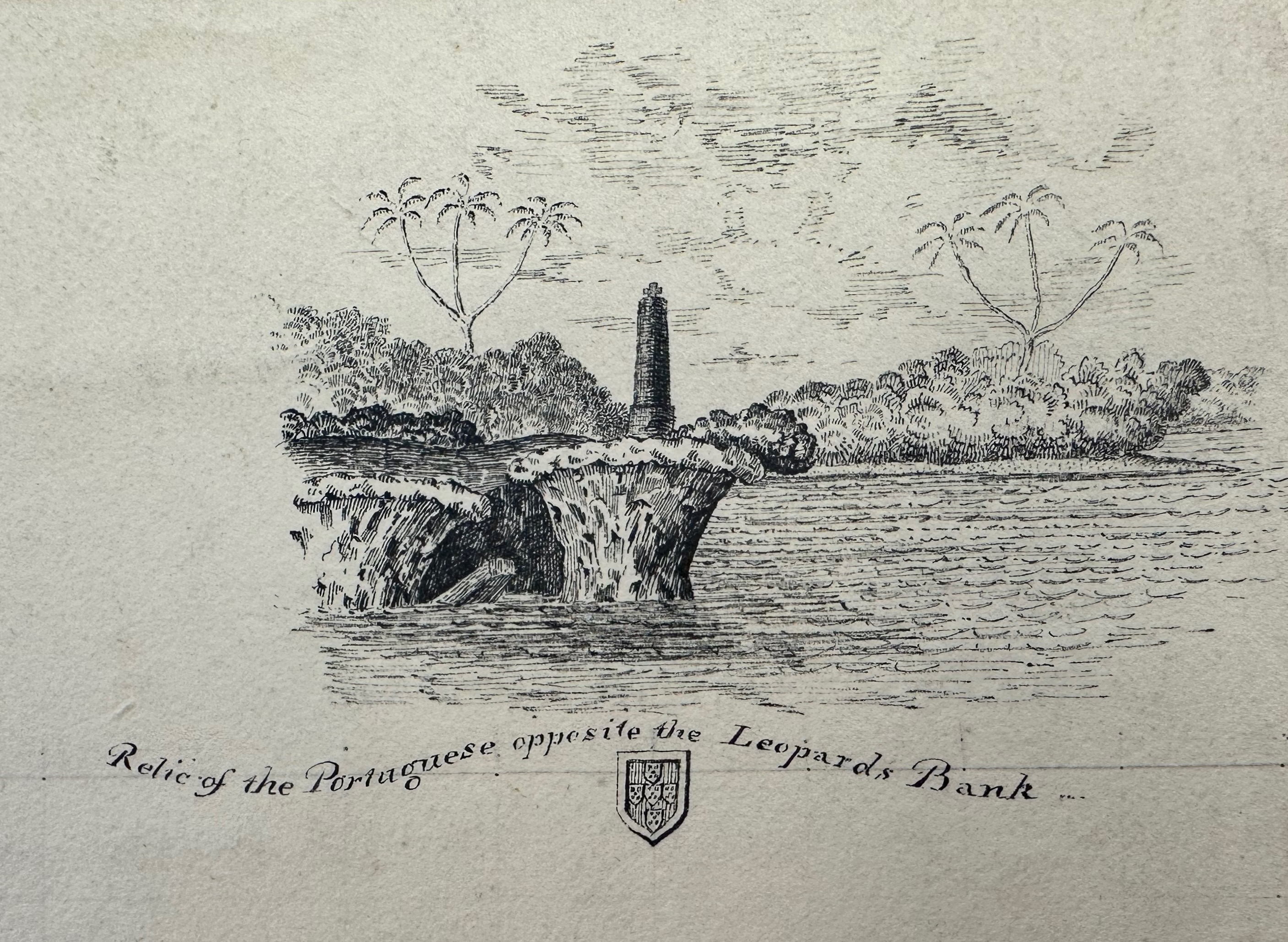
Vasco da Gama cross 1823

The pillar is depicted on a chart of the Leopard Bank (south of Malindi) drawn in November 1823. This was drawn by a British Admiralty survey team led by Captain William Fitzwilliam Owen. Owen described the promontory on which the pillar stood as "perfectly flat at the top, and elevated above the sea about twelve feet. If ever there existed an inscription upon this pillar it is totally obliterated, as not a line can now be traced; but the marble cross on its summit exhibits the arms of Portugal in full preservation." The padrão depicted on Owen's chart was similar in appearance to the modern pillar. This suggests that the original padrão had been strengthened at some earlier time.

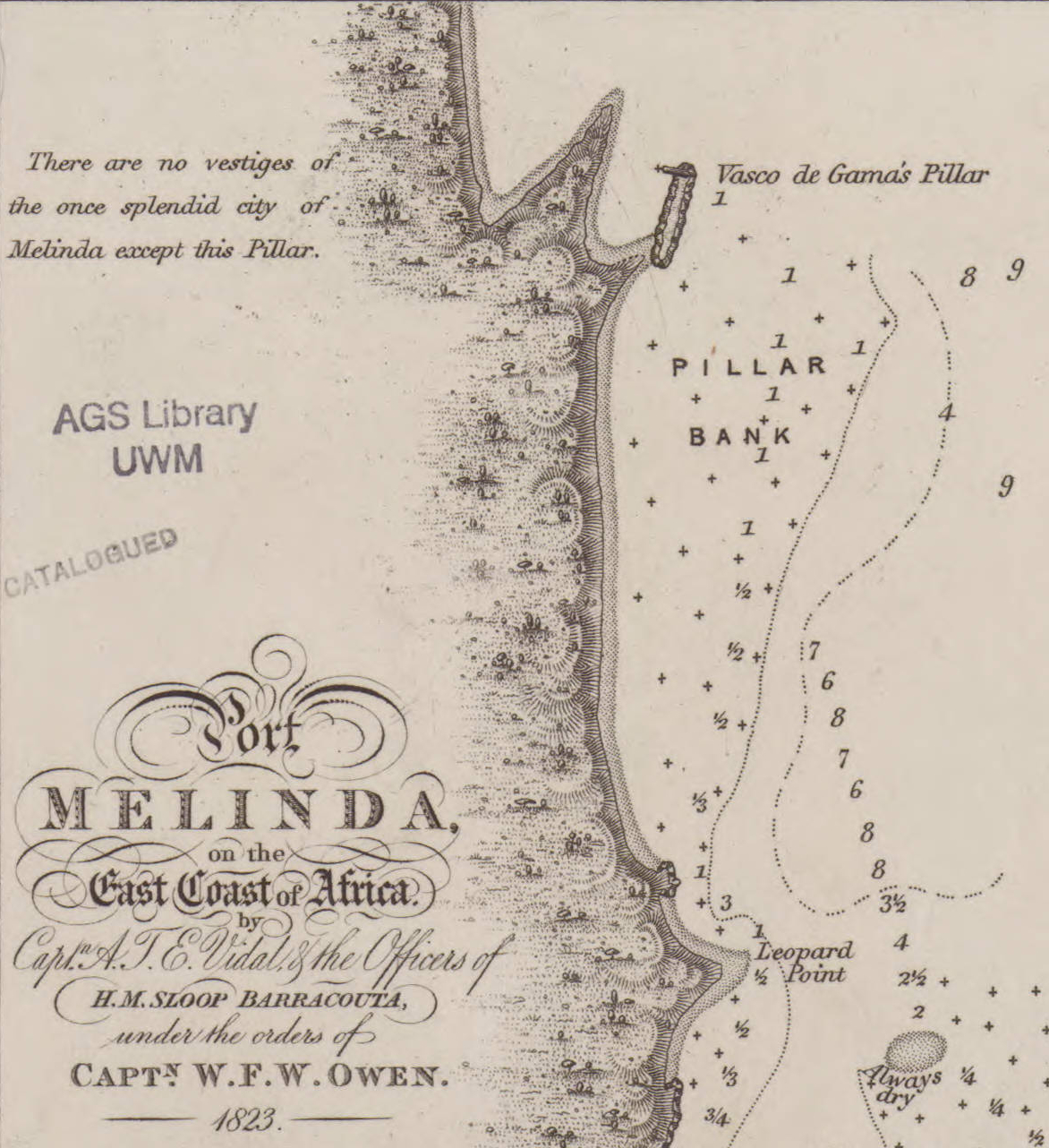
Admiralty Chart No 667 Port Melinda (Malindi) detail

An 1834 United Kingdom Admiralty chart, based on Owen's 1823 version but including his own updates, records the padrão as "Vasco da Gama's Pillar". The same chart notes that at that time there were "no vestiges of the once splendid city of Melinda except this Pillar". The pillar is also noted on an 1867 chart, recording a previously unidentified reef to the south of it.

The headland on which the pillar stands eroded over the years and the exposed position of the padrão meant that it became badly weathered. In April 1873, the British naval officer Captain George John Malcolm of HMS Briton surveyed Malindi. This included a depiction of pillar and the headland on which it stood. He decided the padrão should be reinforced. Vasco da Gama's Pillar is also described briefly in nineteenth-century editions of The Africa Pilot, which provided sailing directions for mariners.

The pillar was declared a National Monument in 1935 and is currently under the National Museums of Kenya. While it has sometimes been claimed that the padrão is made of coral, examinations by the Geological Service of Portugal confirmed that it was limestone with fossils similar to those found in Lisbon limestone beds. This is not surprising, since explorers, including Vasco da Gama, typically took along multiple pre-carved padrões to set up on prominent headlands. These served to advertise Portuguese primacy in discovery and demonstrate the explorers' intent to spread Christianity.

Kenyan stamps of 1998 celebrated the quincentenary of Vasco da Gama's visit. The 42s. stamp showcased the pillar in an artist's impression that gave the pillar the traditional thin-column elevation of a padrão rather than the conical form of the reinforced pillar and the squat cross visible today.

The pillar today is Malindi's most visited heritage site. Restoration work carried out since 2020 has included reinforcement of the existing seawalls, repairs to the pillar itself, the construction of a paved access route and the provision of on-site washrooms for visitors.

Access to the pillar is subject to an entry ticket. A single ticket currently covers the four sites under the control of Malindi Museum. These are: the Vasco da Gama Pillar, the Portuguese Chapel, the House of Columns and the Heritage Complex museum.
