= Malindi =

Municipality in Kilifi County, Kenya

- Municipality
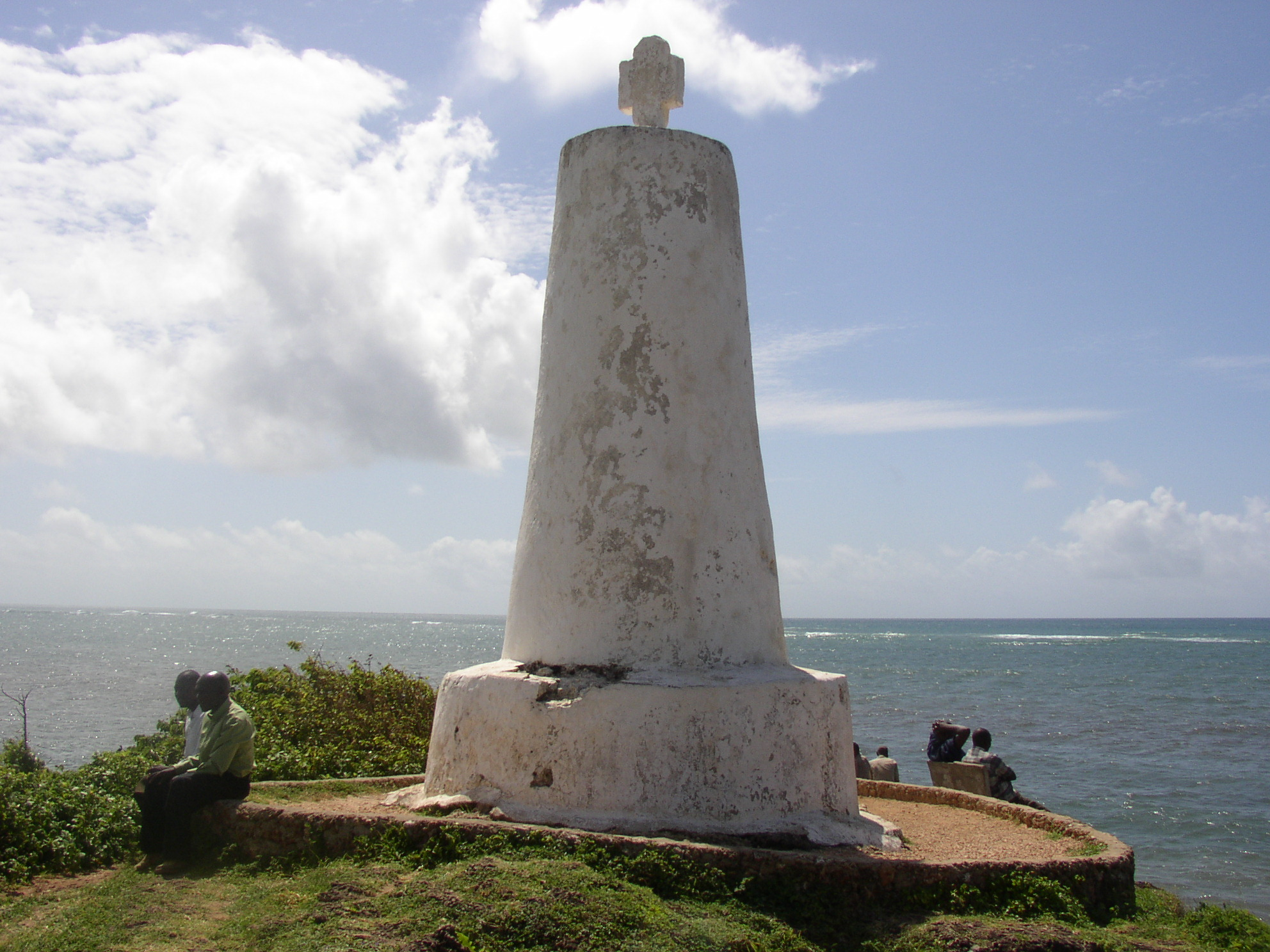
- Vasco da Gama Pillar and Indian Ocean

- Location within Kenya Location within the Horn of Africa Location within Africa
- Coordinates: 3°13′25″S 40°7′48″E
- Country: Kenya
- County: Kilifi County
- Founded: 13th – 14th century
- Re-settled: 1861

Population (2019)
  - Total: 119,859
- Time zone: UTC+3 (EAT)

Malindi (known as Melinde in antiquity) is a town on Malindi Bay at the mouth of the Galana River, lying on the Indian Ocean coast of Kenya. It is 120 kilometres northeast of Mombasa. The population of Malindi was 119,859 as of the 2019 census. It is the largest urban centre in Kilifi County.

== Overview ==
Tourism is the major industry in Malindi. Notable heritage sites include the Vasco da Gama Pillar, the Portuguese Chapel, the House of Columns and the Malindi Museum Heritage Complex.

Malindi is served with a domestic airport and a highway between Mombasa and Lamu. The nearby Watamu town and Gedi Ruins (also known as Gede) are south of Malindi. The mouth of the Sabaki River lies in northern Malindi.

The Watamu and Malindi Marine National Parks form a continuous protected coastal area south of Malindi. The area shows classic examples of Swahili architecture. The majority of Malindi's population is Muslim.

Malindi is home to the Malindi Airport and the Broglio Space Center (the previous San Marco Equatorial Range).

== History ==
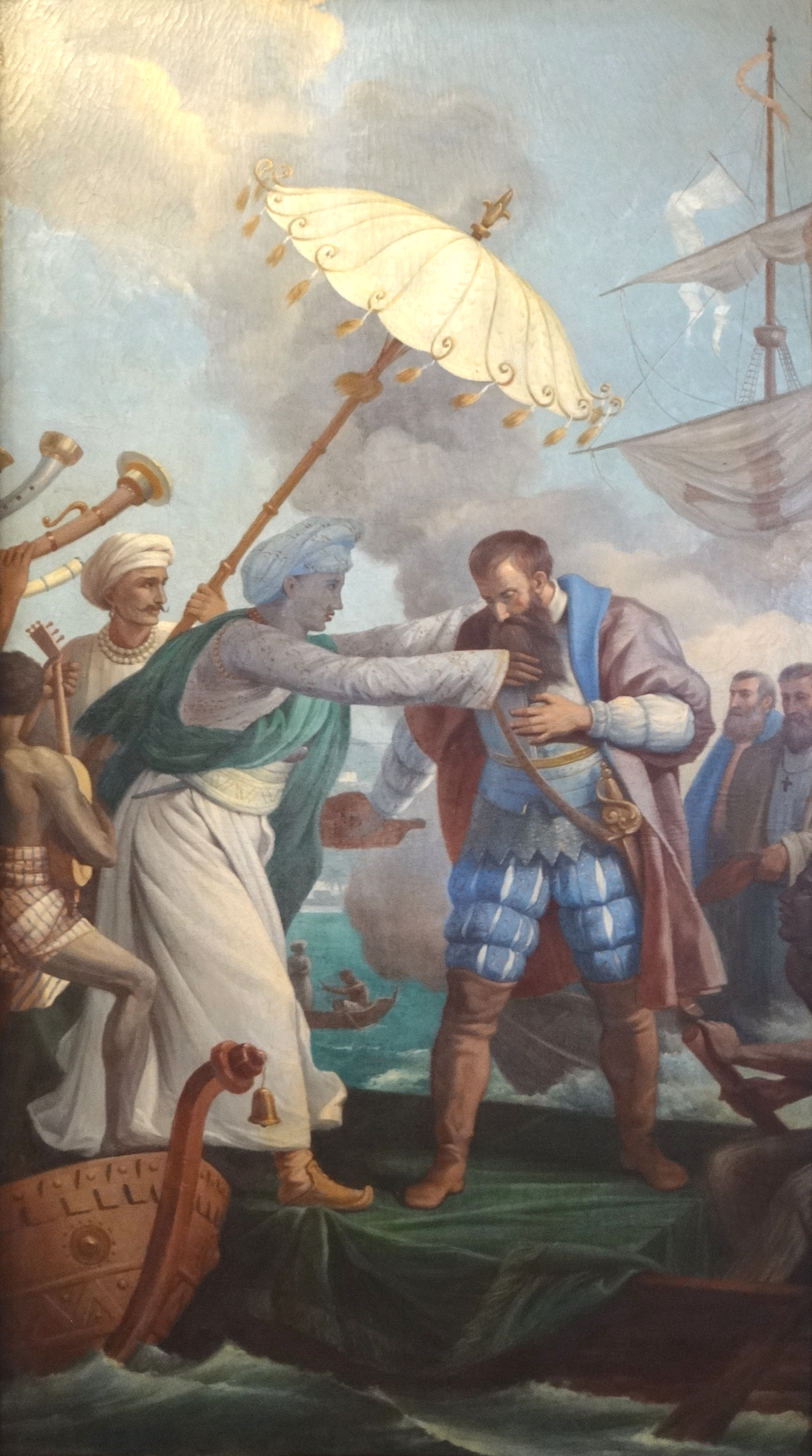
Portuguese explorer Vasco da Gama meeting the King of Malindi in 1498. The Portuguese Empire ruled Malindi from 1500 to 1630.

Malindi developed as part of the emerging Swahili civilisation in the 5th–10th centuries. Bantu-speaking farmers moved into the area, where they smelted iron, built timber and wattle houses thatched with palm leaves, spoke a local dialect of kiSwahili, and engaged in regional and sometimes long-distance trade. The resurgence of the Indian Ocean trade networks at the end of the first millennium led to larger settlements, increased long-distance trade, and greater social complexity. Beginning in the 11th century, the Swahili along the coast were acting as middlemen for Somali, Egyptian, Nubian, Arab, Persian, and Indian traders. They began building walled towns, coral houses, and elites converted to Islam, often speaking Arabic.

The Malindi Kingdom appears to have been formed around the 9th century AD and to have grown powerful in the two centuries before Vasco da Gama ushered in the Portuguese colonisation of the region, the latter leading to the decline of the civilisation. The city of Malindi, founded around 850 AD, was in a somewhat more northerly location than the modern city, and appears to have been destroyed around 1000 AD. There are sparse signs of habitation for the next two centuries, then recovery and prosperity in the 1200s.

The first written reference to the present-day Malindi likely comes from Abu al-Fida (1273–1331), a Kurdish geographer and historian. He wrote that Malindi was situated to the south of the mouth of a river which began in a mountain hundreds of miles away. This mountain may be Mount Kenya, where the Galana River rises. Thus, Malindi has existed as a Swahili settlement since at least the 13th century.

Once rivalled only by Mombasa for dominance in this part of East Africa, Malindi has traditionally been a port city. In 1414, the town was visited by the fleet of the Chinese explorer Zheng He. Malindi's ruler sent a personal envoy with a giraffe as a present to China on that fleet.

The Portuguese explorer Vasco da Gama met Malindi authorities in 1498 to sign a trade agreement and hire a guide for the voyage to India, when he erected a padrão known today as the Vasco da Gama Pillar. Vasco da Gama was given a warm reception from the Sultan of Malindi, which contrasted with the hostile reception he encountered in Mombasa. It is a popular tourist attraction for both local and international tourists.

In 1498, Malindi was a prosperous town with a population between 5,000 and 10,000. The majority of the population was Muslim by this period, having converted largely between the 13th and 14th centuries. Like other Mediaeval Swahili towns, the ruling class or wazee was made up of the heads of the wealthiest patrician families. Similar to other Bantu-speaking peoples, these clan leaders elected a mwenye mui or chief who spoke on behalf of the patricians. The Portuguese mistakenly titled these individuals "Kings," misunderstanding the nature of Swahili political organisation. The wazee spoke both Swahili and Arabic, and claimed mythological origins from the East, most often Persia.

Malindi's main source of prosperity was the export of ivory and rhino horns as well as exporting agricultural products such as coconuts, oranges, millet and rice. In the years before the arrival of the Portuguese, Malindi was a regional power but lagged significantly behind the two greatest states, Mombasa and Kilwa. When, in 1499, the Portuguese established a trading post in Malindi that served as a rest stop on the way to and from India, they were eagerly welcomed by the wazee who sought to use the Portuguese military might to establish themselves over their rivals in Mombasa. In 1500, King Dom Manuel I offered vassal status to Malindi.

As the major East African ally along the Swahili Coast, Malindi supported Portugal's successful efforts to conquer rivaling powers Kilwa and Mombasa in 1505. In 1502, the Portuguese established a factory in Malindi, which lasted till 1593. The decline of Kilwa and Mombasa led to Malindi's flourishing. Malindi grew as other Swahili, as well as Arab, Persian, and Indian, merchants, craftsmen, sailors, and labourers flocked to newly powerful city.

Malindi remained the centre of Portuguese activity in eastern Africa until 1593, when the Portuguese moved their main base to Mombasa. In 1592, the Segeju occupied Mombasa, eventually surrendering it to the Sheikh of Malindi. The Sheikh then moved his court from Malindi to Mombasa and ruled from 1593 to 1630. During this time, he invited his allies, the Portuguese, to build a Garrison and they dominated the city.

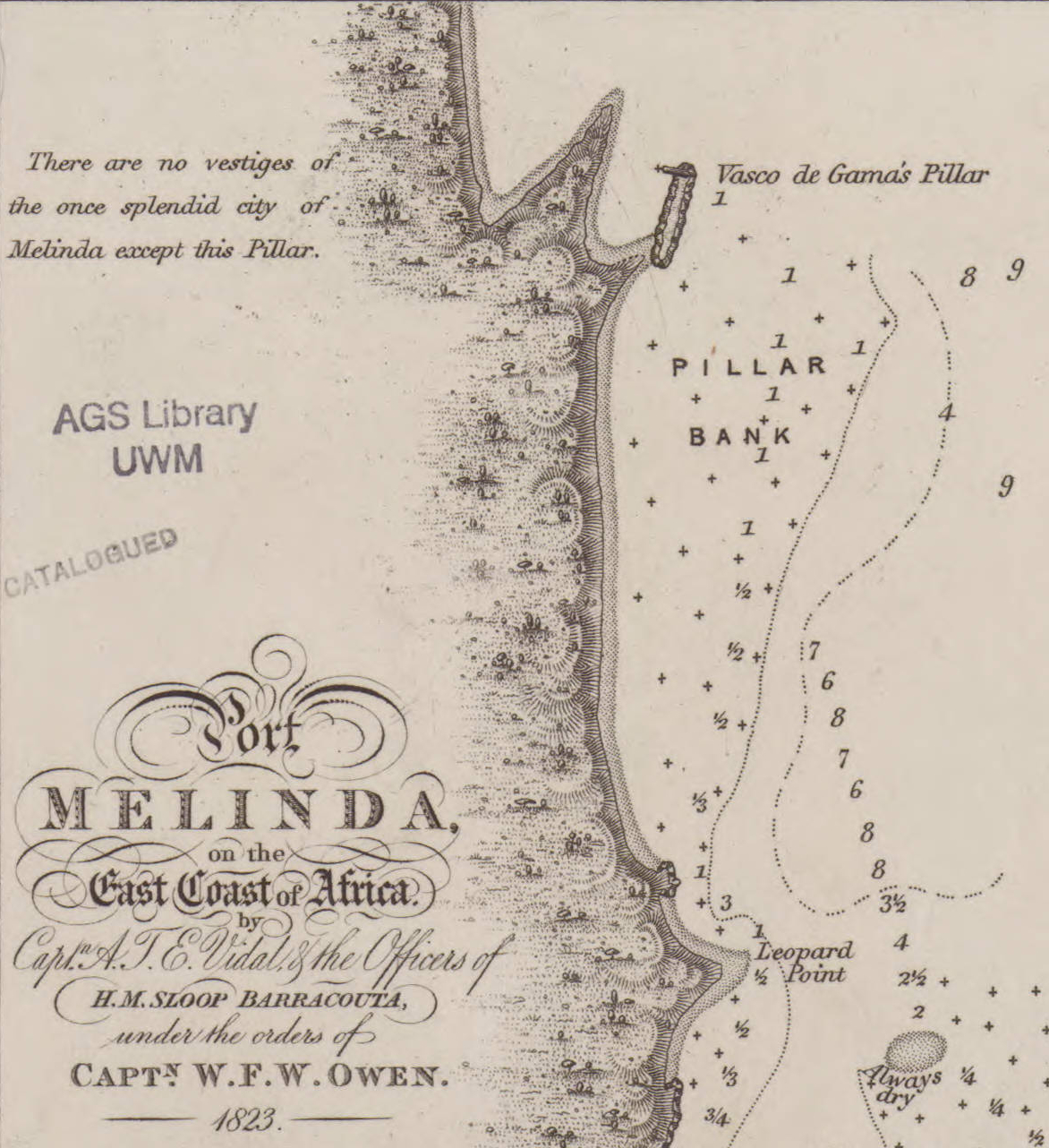
Admiralty Chart No 667 Port Melinda (Malindi) detail

After the Portuguese departed, the town gradually declined until it almost disappeared by the end of 17th century. An 1823 United Kingdom Admiralty chart of 'Melinda' declared that at that time there were 'no vestiges of the once splendid city of Melinda' apart from Vasco da Gama's Pillar. In 1845, Ludwig Krapf visited the town and found it overgrown by vegetation and uninhabited. A Portuguese chapel with a graveyard was built before 1542 when Francis Xavier visited the town. Many buildings of Swahili architecture survive, including the Juma Mosque.

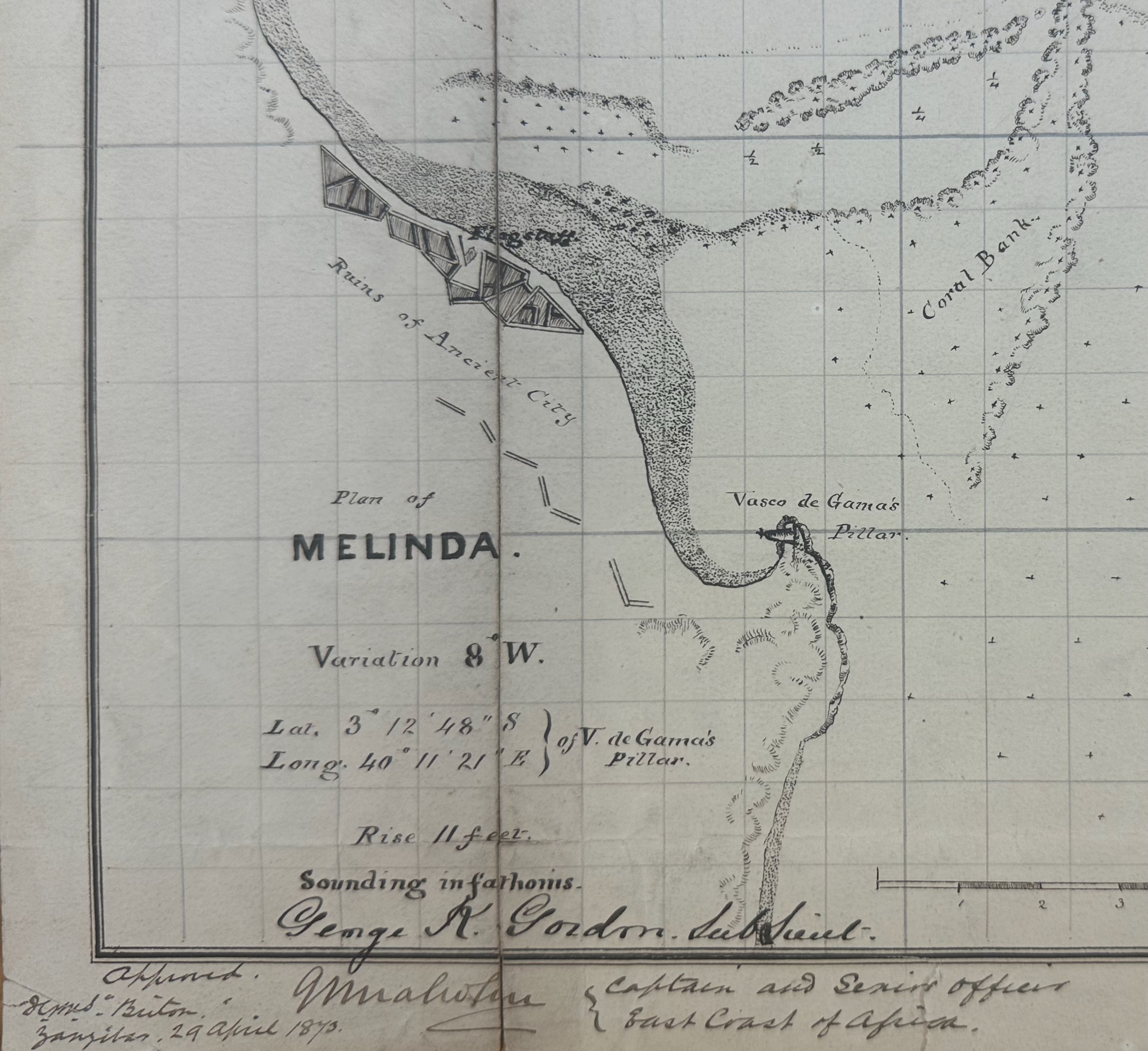
Plan of Malindi, April 1873

Malindi was refounded by Sultan Majid of Zanzibar in 1861 and until the end of 19th century served as a centre of the slave trade. A plan of the town in 1873 indicates the area of occupation by that time. In 1890, Malindi came under British administration and slave trade and slavery were abolished. This act led to a significant decline in agricultural production. Outside agriculture there were few industries in Malindi at the beginning of the 20th century; among them were making mats and bags, crushing sesame seeds for oil and producing a Swahili drink called tembo. Malindi was officially made a town in 1903. Ten years later its population stood at around 1148 and included 843 Africans, 230 Arabs, 67 Asians and 8 Europeans.

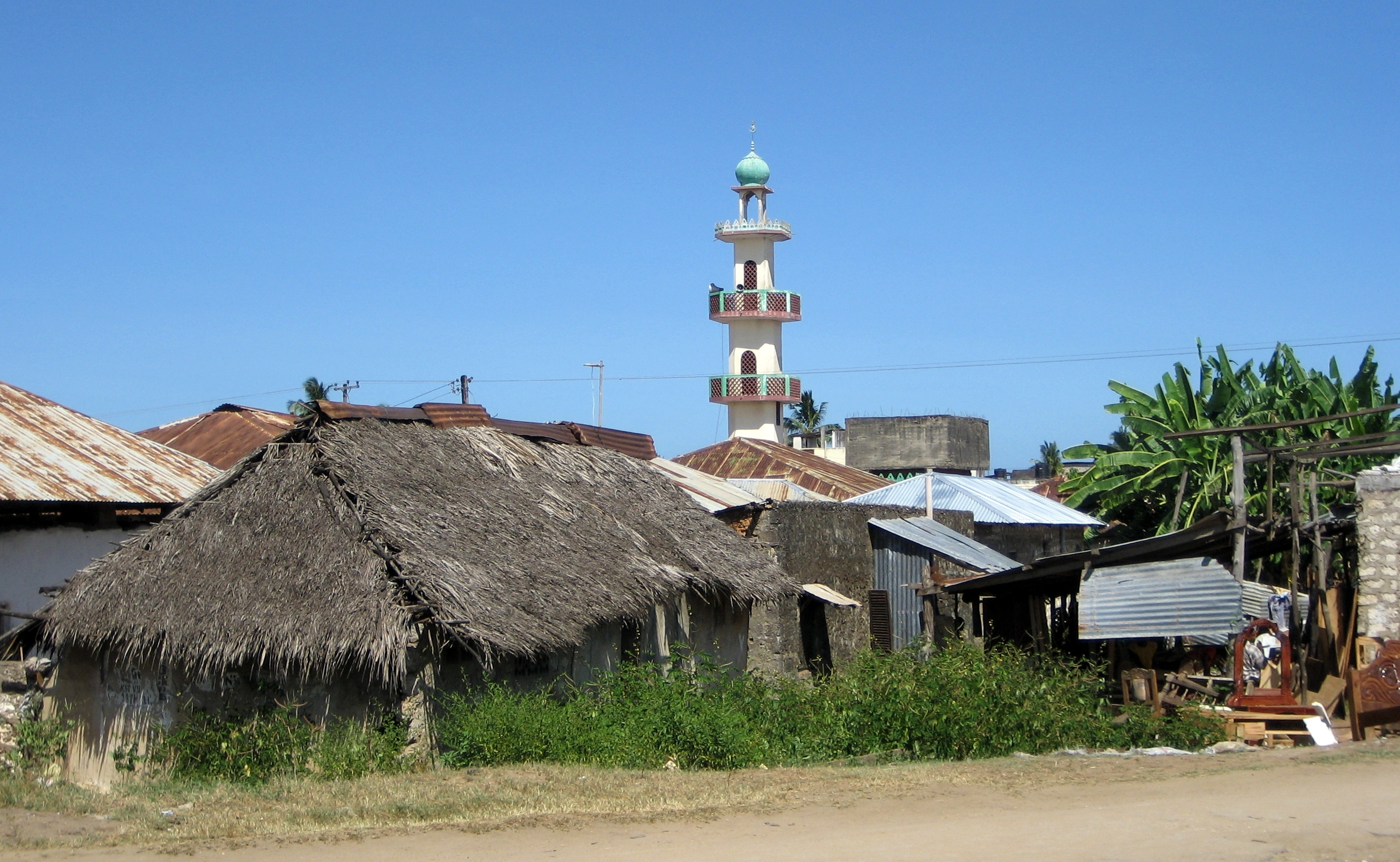
A view of the old town of Malindi

Malindi experienced a trade boom between the end of the World War I and 1925, when a famine occurred. Exports to foreign ports grew to £26,000 by 1924. Europeans started to return to Malindi in the 1930s, buying land from Arabs. Some of them like Commander Lawford opened the first hotels, which became the foundation of the future tourist industry. During World War II, Malindi was one of only two towns in East Africa bombed by the Italians. This happened on 24 October 1940, and after this event allied troops were stationed in the town until the end of the war. After World War II Malindi began developing into a resort. When the Broglio Space Center opened, an Italian diaspora began to form.

== Climate ==
Malindi has a tropical dry savanna climate (Köppen climate classification As).

Climate data for Malindi (1991–2020 normals, extremes 1892–present)
Month	Jan	Feb	Mar	Apr	May	Jun	Jul	Aug	Sep	Oct	Nov	Dec	Year
Record high °C (°F)	34.0 (93.2)	34.0 (93.2)	34.5 (94.1)	39.0 (102.2)	32.2 (90.0)	30.5 (86.9)	30.8 (87.4)	29.8 (85.6)	32.0 (89.6)	32.0 (89.6)	34.1 (93.4)	33.0 (91.4)	39.0 (102.2)
Mean daily maximum °C (°F)	31.0 (87.8)	31.4 (88.5)	32.3 (90.1)	31.7 (89.1)	29.4 (84.9)	28.5 (83.3)	27.8 (82.0)	27.9 (82.2)	28.6 (83.5)	29.8 (85.6)	30.7 (87.3)	31.3 (88.3)	30.0 (86.1)
Daily mean °C (°F)	27.9 (82.2)	28.2 (82.8)	29.0 (84.2)	28.6 (83.5)	26.9 (80.4)	26.2 (79.2)	25.5 (77.9)	25.4 (77.7)	26.0 (78.8)	27.0 (80.6)	27.8 (82.0)	28.2 (82.8)	27.2 (81.0)
Mean daily minimum °C (°F)	24.5 (76.1)	24.5 (76.1)	25.4 (77.7)	25.4 (77.7)	24.3 (75.7)	23.8 (74.8)	22.9 (73.2)	22.8 (73.0)	22.9 (73.2)	23.5 (74.3)	24.2 (75.6)	24.6 (76.3)	24.1 (75.3)
Record low °C (°F)	20.0 (68.0)	19.6 (67.3)	21.0 (69.8)	20.8 (69.4)	21.0 (69.8)	19.5 (67.1)	18.6 (65.5)	17.0 (62.6)	17.2 (63.0)	19.0 (66.2)	19.0 (66.2)	21.0 (69.8)	17.0 (62.6)
Average precipitation mm (inches)	11 (0.4)	17 (0.7)	36 (1.4)	163 (6.4)	298 (11.7)	154 (6.1)	91 (3.6)	64 (2.5)	47 (1.9)	68 (2.7)	75 (3.0)	35 (1.4)	1,059 (41.7)
Average precipitation days	2	2	3	11	17	12	12	9	7	6	6	3	90
Source 1: World Meteorological Organization
Source 2: Meteo Climat

== Local governance ==
Malindi now falls under Kilifi County as per the administrative changes in the new constitution passed in August 2010. Malindi forms a municipal council with the following thirteen wards: Barani, Ganda/Mkaumoto, Gede, Gede North, Gede South, Kijiwetanga, Madunguni, Malimo, Malindi Central, Malindi North, Maweni, Shella, and Watamu Town. All of them are located within Malindi Constituency.

== Recent Developments ==
=== Festivals and Culture ===
In July 2026, Malindi hosted the Summertides Festival, relocated from Diani Beach. The three-day event at Lost Beach Club attracted over 15,000 attendees and featured performances in Afrobeats, Amapiano, EDM, R&B, and Dancehall. The festival contributed significantly to the local economy, with hotels and short-term rentals fully booked and increased demand for transport and hospitality services. Security was coordinated by multi-agency patrols, ensuring a safe environment for visitors.

Natural Attractions

The Mambrui Sand Dunes, located approximately 6 km north of Malindi, have become a popular tourist destination. Known locally as "Little Dubai," the dunes offer quad biking, sandboarding, and archaeological interest, with discoveries such as 15th-century Chinese coins highlighting Malindi’s historical trade connections. Entry fees support community development initiatives.

Hell Kitchen in Marafa is also a very popular tourist attaraction.

Banking Sector Malindi has developed into a financial hub within Kilifi County, hosting at least 12 bank branches. Institutions represented include Equity Bank, Kenya Commercial Bank, Co-operative Bank, Family Bank, Gulf African Bank, NCBA, National Bank of Kenya, Stanbic Bank, I&M Bank, Diamond Trust Bank, and ABSA. This concentration of financial services supports the town’s tourism, trade, and real estate sectors.

Real Estate and Land Market The town has experienced a surge in real estate activity, with cheap plots ranging from KES 240,000 to 1.4 million for standard 50×100 ft parcels. Agricultural land is often priced lower. However, Malindi has also been associated with land scams, including fraudulent title deeds, impersonation of landowners, and pressure tactics to secure deposits. Authorities and legal experts advise prospective buyers to conduct title searches at the Kilifi Land Registry, engage licensed lawyers, and ensure payments are made through regulated conveyancer accounts.

== Gallery ==
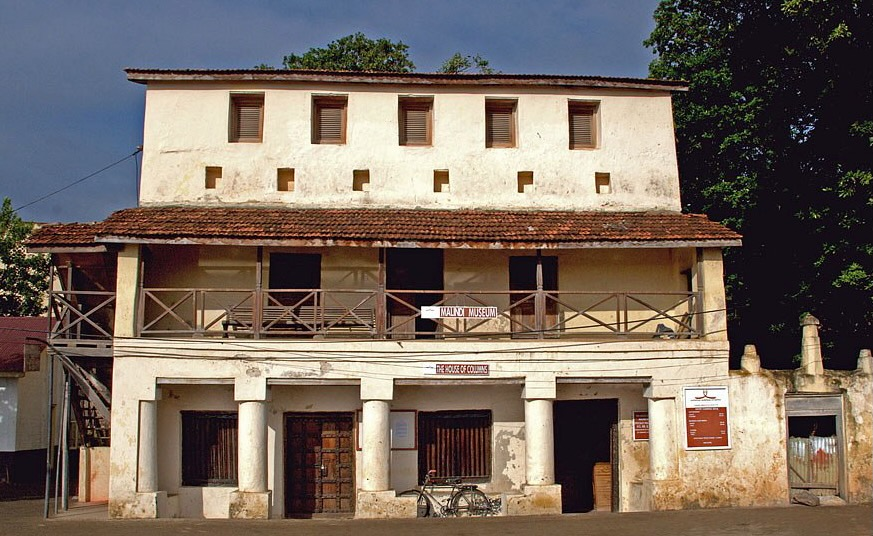
The front of the "House of Columns"

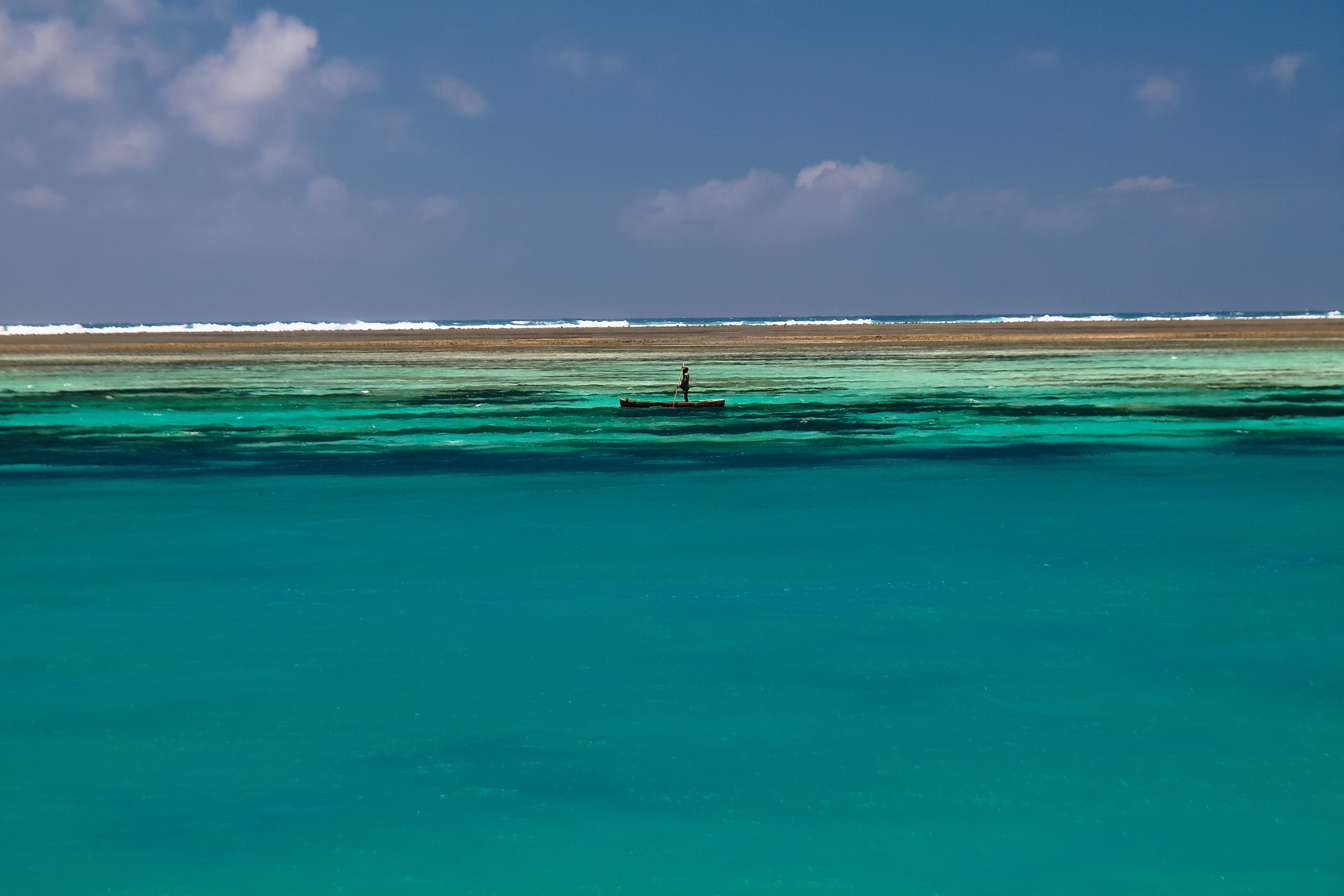
Near Robinson Island north of Malindi

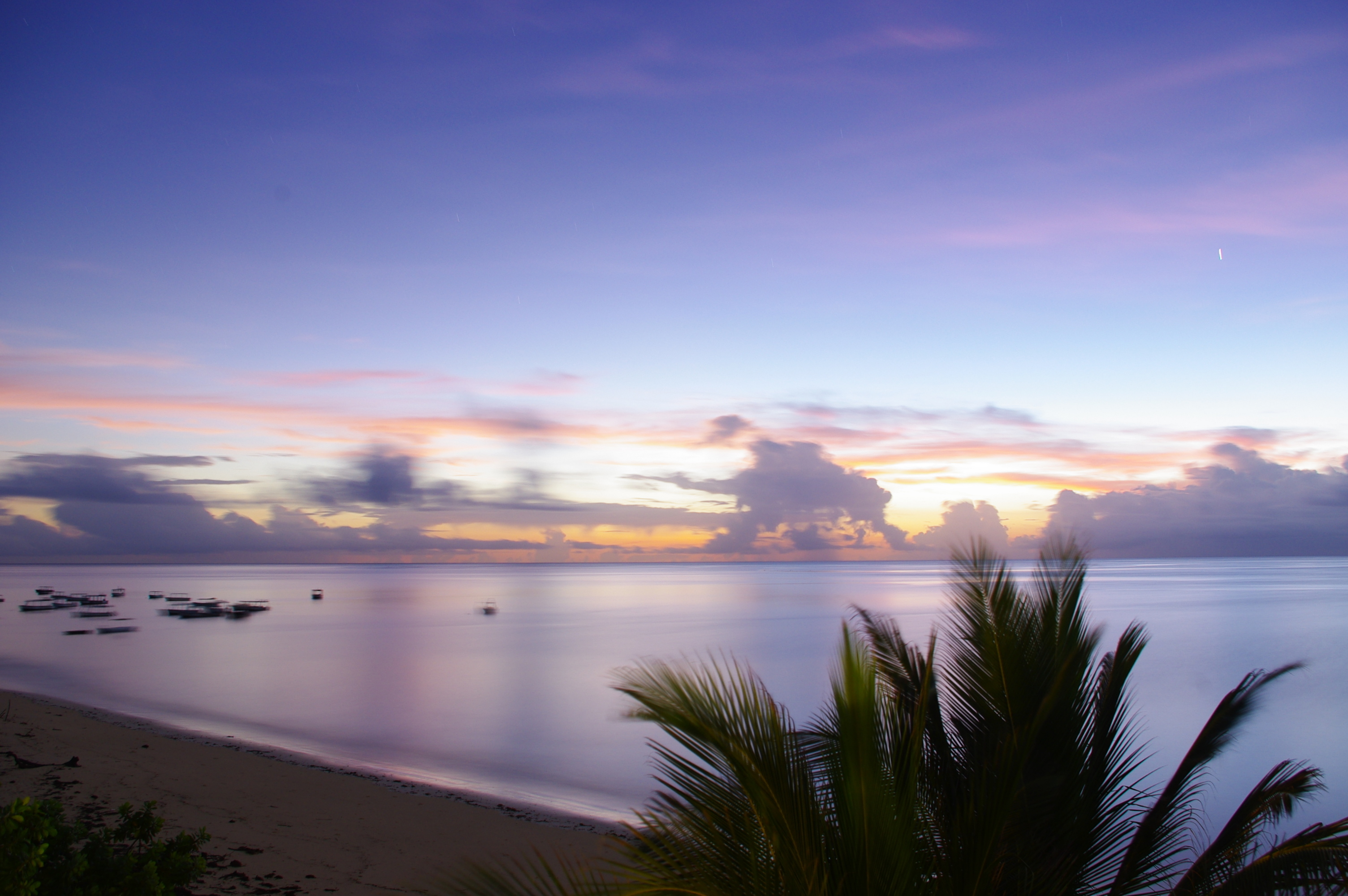
Sunrise over the Indian Ocean at Malindi

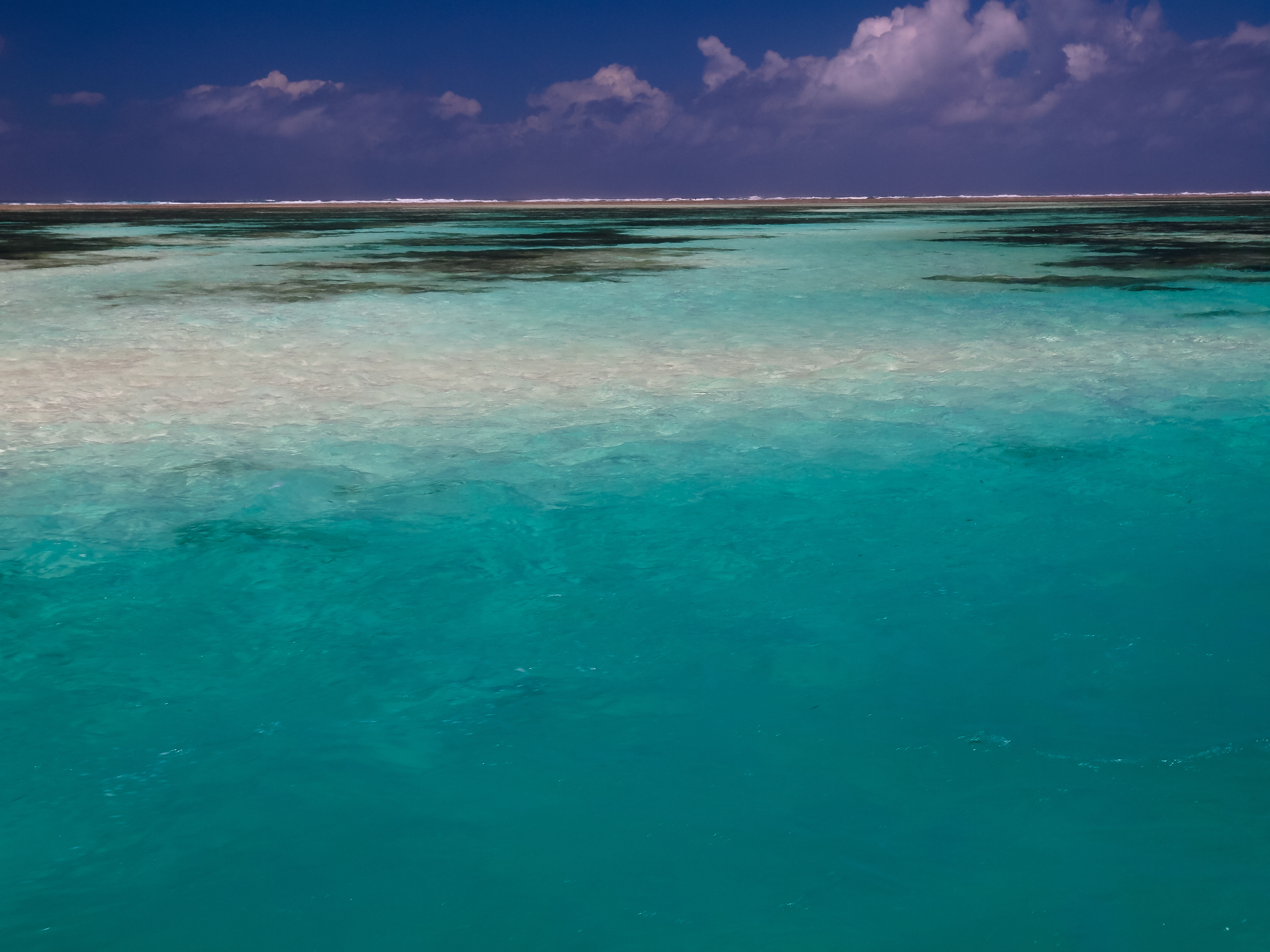
Beach close to Malindi

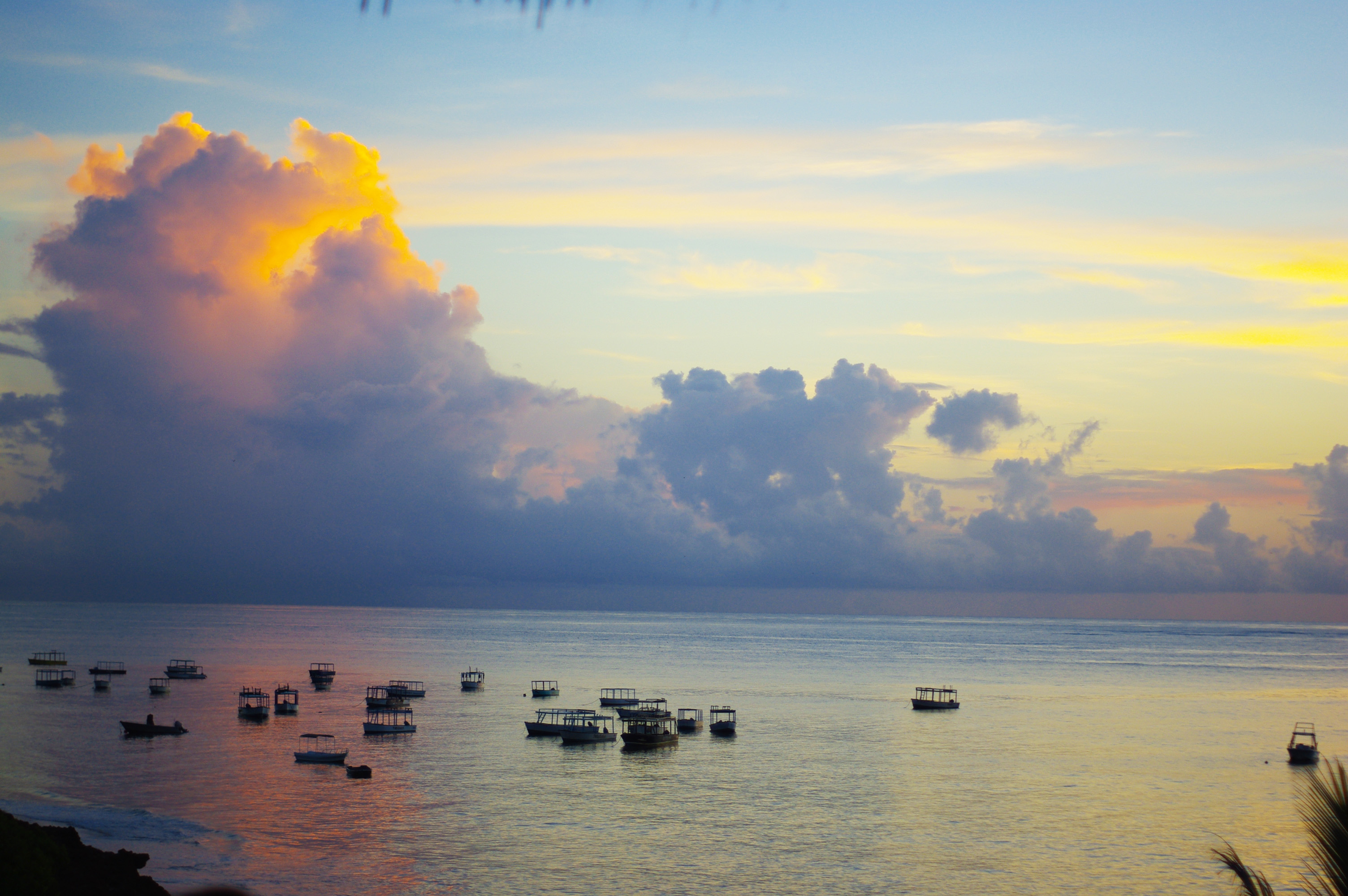
Boats at sunset in Malindi

== In popular culture ==
The novel "MALI D'AFRICA" (by Sara Cardelli) describes an impossible love in Malindi.

Most of the events in Andrei Gusev's novels Once in Malindi (2021) and Our Wild Sex in Malindi (2020) take place in Malindi, Watamu, or Lamu. The novels describe the protagonists' (Russian writer Andy and his wife Jennifer, who was born in Kenya) lives in these towns in the 2010s.

The song "Yasoi Malindi" was written by Yasoy Kala Kana about the town.

== See also ==
- Historic Swahili Settlements
- Swahili architecture
- Vasco da Gama Pillar, Malindi
- Portuguese Chapel, Malindi
- House of Columns, Malindi
- Malindi Kingdom
- Sinking of the Christiana Hama
