= Jamia Mosque (Kenya) =

Mosque in Nairobi, Kenya

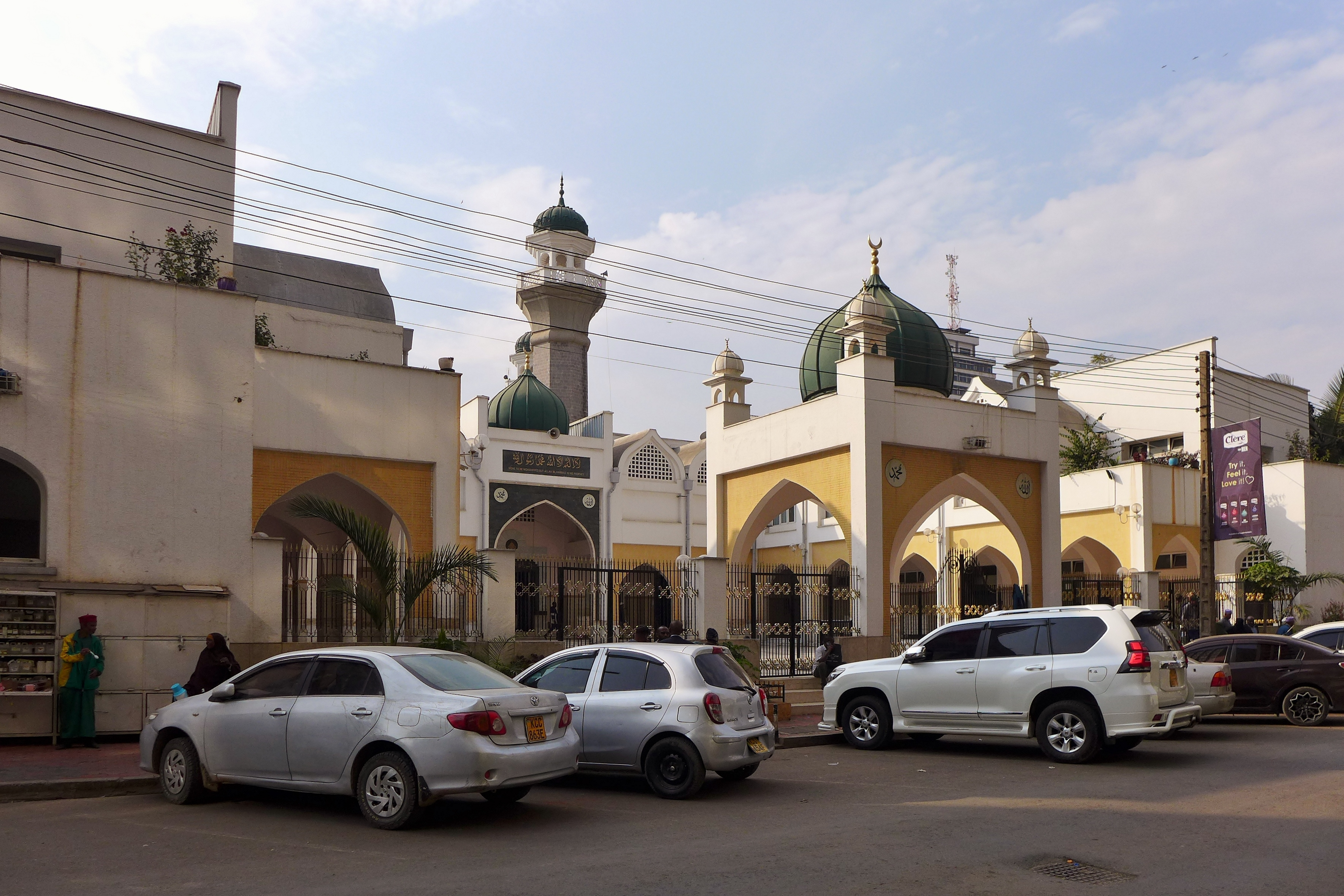
- The mosque in 2025

- Location within Kenya

Religion
- Affiliation: Sunni Islam

Location
- Location: Banda Street, Nairobi, Kenya
- Coordinates: 1°17′01″S 36°49′15″E

Architecture
- Architect: William Landels
- Type: Mosque
- Style: Mughal-inspired architecture with Western influences
- Groundbreaking: 2 August 1925
- Completed: 1993

Specifications
- Capacity: 5,000
- Dome: 3
- Minaret: 2

Jamia Mosque, also known as Jamia Masjid, is a Sunni mosque on Banda Street in the Nairobi Central Business District, Kenya. The present mosque was designed by Glasgow-based architect William Landels and constructed between 1925 and 1933 through an extensive community fundraising effort organised by the Anjuman Islamia, also known as the Jamia Mosque Association.

Its architecture draws principally on seventeenth-century Mughal architecture, particularly the Jama Masjid in Delhi and the Badshahi Mosque in Lahore, while incorporating elements associated with British and Scottish architecture. At its completion in 1933, it was the tallest building in Nairobi and was described as the largest mosque in East Africa.

The mosque developed from Nairobi's early twentieth-century Muslim community and an earlier Jamia Mosque near the city's bazaar. Initially associated particularly with Punjabi Muslim migrants, Jamia subsequently developed into a major centre of Muslim worship, education, social activity and public life in Kenya.

== History ==
=== Indian migration and early Muslim settlement in Nairobi ===
The history of Jamia Mosque is closely connected with the construction of the Uganda Railway and the growth of Nairobi around the end of the nineteenth century. South Asians had maintained commercial and cultural connections with East Africa for centuries, but migration increased considerably when the British colonial administration began recruiting labour from India for construction of the railway.

Between 1895 and the completion of the railway in 1901, nearly 32,000 Indians were brought to East Africa. Of these, 2,498 died during the construction of the railway. Most of the survivors subsequently returned to India, but approximately 6,724 remained in East Africa, including many Punjabi Muslims.

Nairobi was founded in 1899 and became the operational headquarters of the railway in the same year. The colonial administration subsequently transferred its headquarters from Mombasa to Nairobi, which became the capital of British East Africa in 1905. Indian engineers, clerks, masons, painters, traders and other skilled and unskilled workers were among those who settled around the railway headquarters. By 1909, Nairobi had 3,171 Indian residents.

Muslim railway workers established places of worship as they settled along the railway. Many of the earliest were temporary structures made from corrugated iron. Materials from an early mosque at Kilindini in Mombasa were brought to Nairobi and used for a mosque in the railway landhies, or railway residential quarters. As the Muslim population became more established, temporary structures were progressively replaced by permanent stone buildings.

=== Early Jamia Mosque ===
An early Jamia Mosque was established near Nairobi's bazaar in 1902. The mosque was founded by Syed Maulana Abdullah Shah, who became an important figure in Nairobi's Muslim community. As Nairobi expanded and became the colonial capital, the congregation outgrew the original building, and by the early 1920s plans were being made for a substantially larger mosque. Abdullah Shah later participated in the development of the larger mosque that replaced it.

=== Anjuman Islamia and plans for a larger mosque ===
The organisation principally responsible for developing the present building was the Anjuman Islamia, also known as the Jamia Mosque Association. In 1916, the association purchased land in Nairobi's business district from the British colonial government for 13,960 shillings. The site lay south of the Indian markets and near the earlier mosque.

The decision to construct a much larger mosque was a collective initiative of Nairobi's Muslims, with particularly strong support from the Punjabi Muslim community.

The new mosque was designed by William Landels, a Glasgow-based architect. The project combined Mughal architectural models from South Asia with a British architect's interpretation of those forms within the colonial built environment of Nairobi.

=== Construction, 1925–1933 ===
Formal construction began in 1925. On 2 August, Maulana Abdul Momin, imam of the recently constructed Jamia Mosque at Muthurwa, led the groundbreaking ceremony. On 27 September 1925, Abdullah Shah laid the foundation stone of the new mosque.

A further ceremony took place on 23 March 1926, when Sultan Muhammad Shah, Aga Khan III, laid a skewback stone for the main arch of the entrance. The gathering included Africans and Europeans as well as Muslim and non-Muslim guests.

The design was subject to colonial approval. The first plans were rejected because of the proposed height of the minarets, which were subsequently reduced.

Construction of the mosque required a large fundraising campaign extending beyond Nairobi. Abdullah Shah and other organisers sought contributions throughout British East Africa and India. Donations were made by major trading and contracting businesses as well as by individuals from a wide range of occupations, including butchers, cartmen, drivers, engineers, hotelkeepers, masons, mechanics and tailors.

The campaign received contributions from Punjabi, Arab and African Muslims as well as from non-Muslims. The donors included Sunnis and Shias, as well as Hindus, Sikhs and Parsees. Some women contributed jewellery such as bangles. One hundred and twenty-two Muslim women in Nairobi contributed a combined 2,545 shillings, while non-Muslim Nairobi residents contributed 275 shillings. Aga Khan III donated 15,000 shillings when he laid the entrance stone and promised a further 15,000 once the Anjuman Islamia had raised 75,000 shillings.

By the end of 1927, more than 1,500 individuals from Kenya, Uganda, Tanganyika, Zanzibar and South Africa had contributed nearly 172,000 shillings, a little over one-third of the estimated 500,000 shillings required for construction.

=== Educational and religious objectives ===
The Anjuman Islamia's ambitions for the new institution extended beyond the provision of a larger prayer space. In a fundraising appeal published in 1928, the association envisaged the mosque and an associated school as centres for Quranic education and Islamic teaching. The programme was intended to involve trained Muslim teachers drawn from Somali, Swahili, Arab and Indian communities and ultimately to extend its educational and religious activities beyond Nairobi.

The plans reflected the development of Jamia from a mosque serving principally Nairobi's Punjabi community into an institution intended to engage Muslims of different ethnic and linguistic backgrounds across East Africa.

=== Completion and opening ===
After approximately eight years of construction, the mosque was completed in 1933.

Its formal opening took place on 18 August 1933. Thousands of South Asian, Arab and African Muslims participated in a procession from the former Indian National Bank building, now occupied by the Kenya National Archives, to the newly completed mosque. Later that afternoon, Khalifa bin Harub, Sultan of Zanzibar, formally opened the mosque for prayer.

At its completion, Jamia Mosque was the tallest building in Nairobi and one of the largest mosques in East Africa. Despite the reduction in the planned height of the minarets, it remained Nairobi's tallest building for many years.

== Architecture ==
=== Mughal influences ===
Jamia Mosque is strongly influenced by the architecture of the Mughal Empire. Its plans were modelled on the great mosques built by the Mughal emperors Shah Jahan in Delhi and Aurangzeb in Lahore.

The principal precedents were the Jama Masjid of Delhi, completed in 1658 under Shah Jahan, and the Badshahi Mosque in Lahore, completed in 1673 under Aurangzeb. Jamia's three bulbous domes, its two octagonal minarets capped by chhatris, and the smaller chhatri-like elements around its principal entrance recall these seventeenth-century Mughal buildings.

The architectural connection was also relevant to the mosque's patrons. Abdullah Shah had spent time in Lahore before migrating to East Africa and was familiar with the Badshahi Mosque. The Mughal vocabulary of the building connected Nairobi's Punjabi Muslim community with its South Asian heritage.

=== British and Scottish influences ===
Despite its Mughal appearance, the mosque is not a direct reproduction of an Indian building. Landels combined Mughal motifs with architectural ideas circulating within Britain and the wider British Empire.

The organisation of three smaller arches within a larger principal arch on the façade was not characteristic of Mughal architecture but was common in Western religious and commercial buildings. Landels also employed multicoloured masonry, relating both to the polychromy of Mughal architecture and to late-Victorian British buildings such as the Templeton On The Green in Glasgow.

The construction materials also reflected the mosque's transnational origins. Rather than the white-marble domes of its Mughal precedents, Jamia's domes were fabricated from steel and white copper in England and shipped to Nairobi.

The completed mosque combined Mughal forms with a comparatively restrained façade influenced by contemporary Scottish architecture. In this respect, Jamia differed from the nearby Khoja Mosque, whose Victorian-inspired appearance, clock tower and lack of a conventional dome gave it more in common visually with British commercial and administrative buildings. The mosque also stood alongside prominent colonial buildings including the neoclassical McMillan Memorial Library, completed in 1931.

== Expansion and facilities ==
Jamia Mosque has also served as a centre for social and educational support in Nairobi's Muslim community, including the provision of scholarships, counselling, family resource center, alongside the mosque's wider religious and community functions.

A modern wing was added to the mosque complex in 1998. The complex includes a library, a multipurpose hall and offices associated with The Friday Bulletin and Horizon TV. The Jamia Training Institute, which was previously located within the mosque complex, was later moved to Jamia Towers.

== See also ==
- Islam in Kenya
- Indians in Kenya
- Mughal architecture
- List of mosques in Africa
