= List of mosques in Kenya =

This is a list of mosques in Kenya.

Name	Image	Location	Year (CE)	Remarks
Khoja Mosque		Nairobi	1922	
Jamia Mosque		Nairobi	1906	
Parklands mosque		Nairobi		
Masjid Al Ameen		Nairobi		
Mosque of Jesus Christ Son of Mary		Kirinyaga	2021	

== See also ==
- Islam in Kenya
- List of mosques in Africa
