= Bomas of Kenya =

Tourist village in Langata, Nairobi

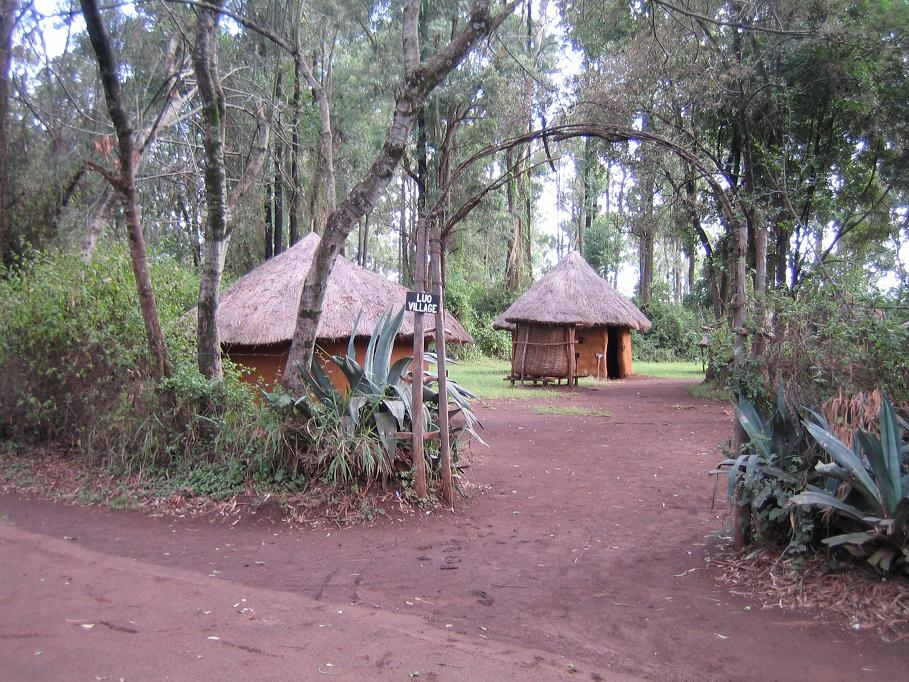
- The Luo village at the Bomas of Kenya
- Established: October 1971; 55 years ago
- Location: Langata, Nairobi
- Coordinates: 1°20′13″S 36°46′09″E
- Type: Cultural center
- Website: www.bomasofkenya.co.ke

Bomas of Kenya is a tourist village in Langata, Nairobi, in Kenya. Bomas interpreted to mean (homesteads) displays traditional villages belonging to the several Kenyan tribes. Bomas of Kenya is home to one of the largest auditoriums in Africa. It is located approximately 10km from Nairobi's central business district.

It is a State Corporation under the Ministry of Gender, Culture, the Arts & Heritage.

== Origin ==
Kenya's independent government in 1965 established the Kenya Tourist Development Corporation (KTDC), under the then Ministry of Information and Tourism. It was through this body that the Bomas Of Kenya was established in October 1971, under the ingenuity of Barack Obama Snr. It was mandated to preserve and promote cultural tourism, with showcases of different Kenyan traditional cultures in their authentic forms. He proposed its current location, which was convenient enough to target the tourists who were visiting the nearby Nairobi National Park.

== Cultural Tourism ==
- There is a display of traditional huts of various Kenyan communities. These homes are made of mud, thatched grass, wood and are reconstructed with emphasis on the social organization, lifestyle, and traditions of the communities.
- The Bomas of Kenya offers visitors a glimpse of the different Kenyan cultures through songs, dances and architectural villages of the different ethnic groupings. The Bomas Harambee Dancers perform these songs and dances, adapted from the Kenyan communities, to the sound of musical instruments, originally used by the ancestors. The resident troupe, the Bomas Harambee Dancers, was founded in 1973 and takes its name from harambee, the call for unity and cooperation used by the first president, Jomo Kenyatta.
- The Bomas of Kenya has a gallery with displays of cultural artefacts such as stools, vessels, and musical instruments used by different Kenyan communities for rituals and special ceremonies.
- Visitors also have the option of being treated to local traditional cuisines while at the Utamaduni Restaurant.
- There are craft shops offering selections of local handiwork, including beadwork, carvings, traditional artifacts, and African attire.
- The Bomas library and multimedia centre contains information on Kenyan culture in periodicals, books, audio and video formats, enabling researchers, students, teachers and tourists to find fact-based information about Kenyan communities and their cultures.

== Political and Constitutional Importance ==
The Constitution of Kenya Review Commission (CKRC) was mandated to organize a National Constitutional Conference in accordance with section 27(1)(1) of the Constitution of Kenya Review Act.

The Draft Constitution of Kenya 2004, commonly known as The Bomas Draft, was the outcome of the National Constitutional Conference held at the Bomas of Kenya for a total of 139 days from April 2003 to 2004:

- The first conference (Bomas I) lasted from April to June 2003.
- Bomas II from August until September 2003.
- Bomas III, which finalised the "Bomas draft" constitutional bill, ran from January to March 2004.

The Bomas draft proposed to significantly reduce presidential powers and create a powerful prime minister. It also called for a much devolved form of parliamentary government, with different tiers of government.

Moreover, Bomas of Kenya has always been the National Tallying Centre for the Kenyan elections over the years, including in 2022.

== Renovations ==
In March 2025, The Bomas of Kenya was temporarily closed for a major renovation and upgrading of the facility. This was confirmed through a cabinet meeting circular released from the government.

The process will include the construction of the Bomas International Convention Centre (BICC), aimed at positioning Nairobi as a leading Meetings, incentives, conferences, and exhibitions destination.

Turkish company, Summa Turizm Yatirimciligi Anonim Sirket, won the tender bid for renovations and construction, after a Kenyan court case decision went in their favor.

== See also ==
1. National Museums of Kenya
2. Karen Blixen Museum, Kenya
3. Nairobi Gallery
4. Nairobi Railway Museum
5. African Heritage House
6. Kenya National Archives
