= African Heritage House =

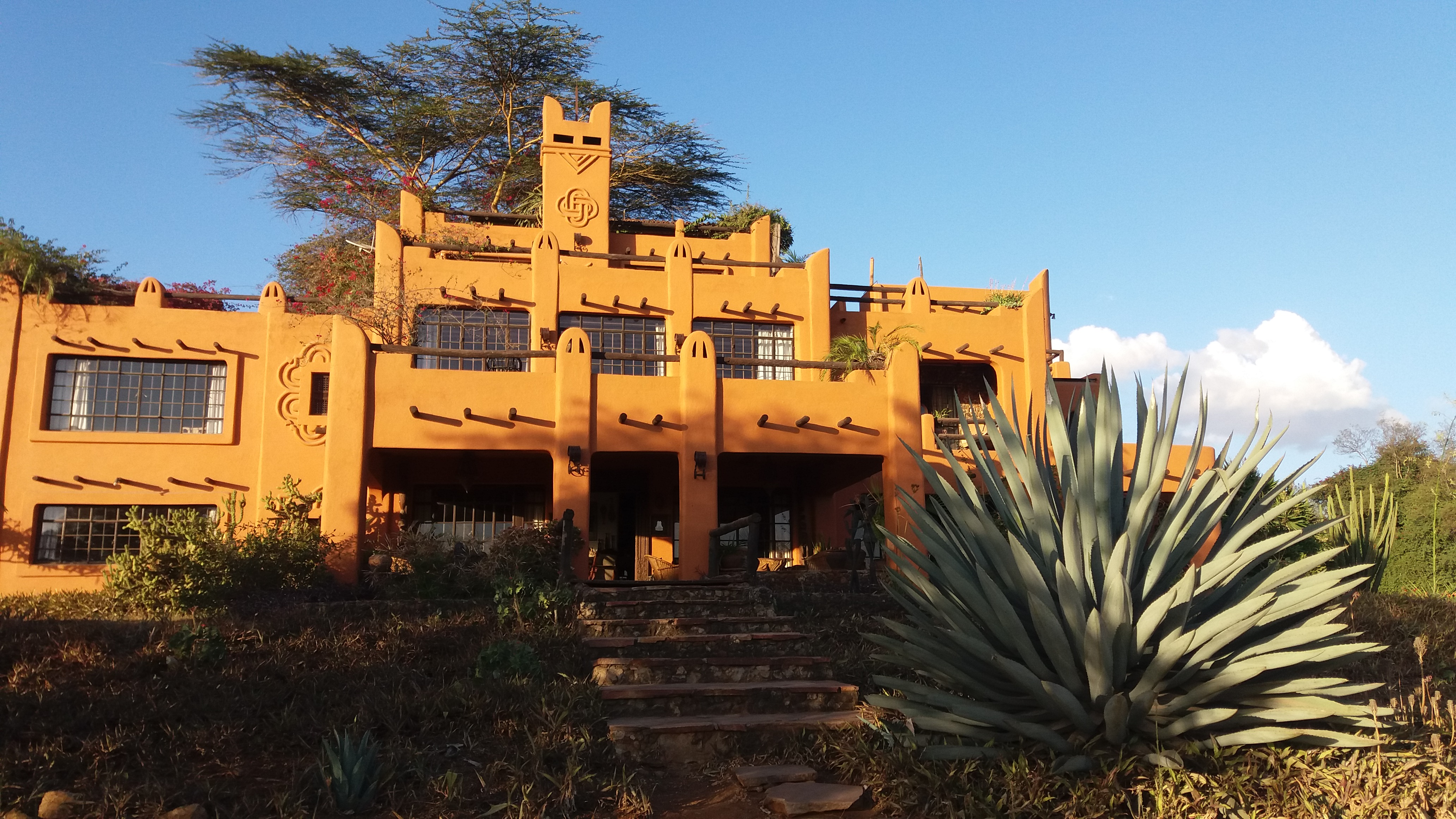
- Front view of African Heritage House

General information
- Architectural style: Indigenous architecture
- Location: Mlolongo, Machakos county, Kenya
- Coordinates: 1°24′2.582″S 36°56′20.987″E
- Construction started: 1989
- Inaugurated: 1994
- Owner: Alan Donovan

Website
- https://africanheritagehouse.info

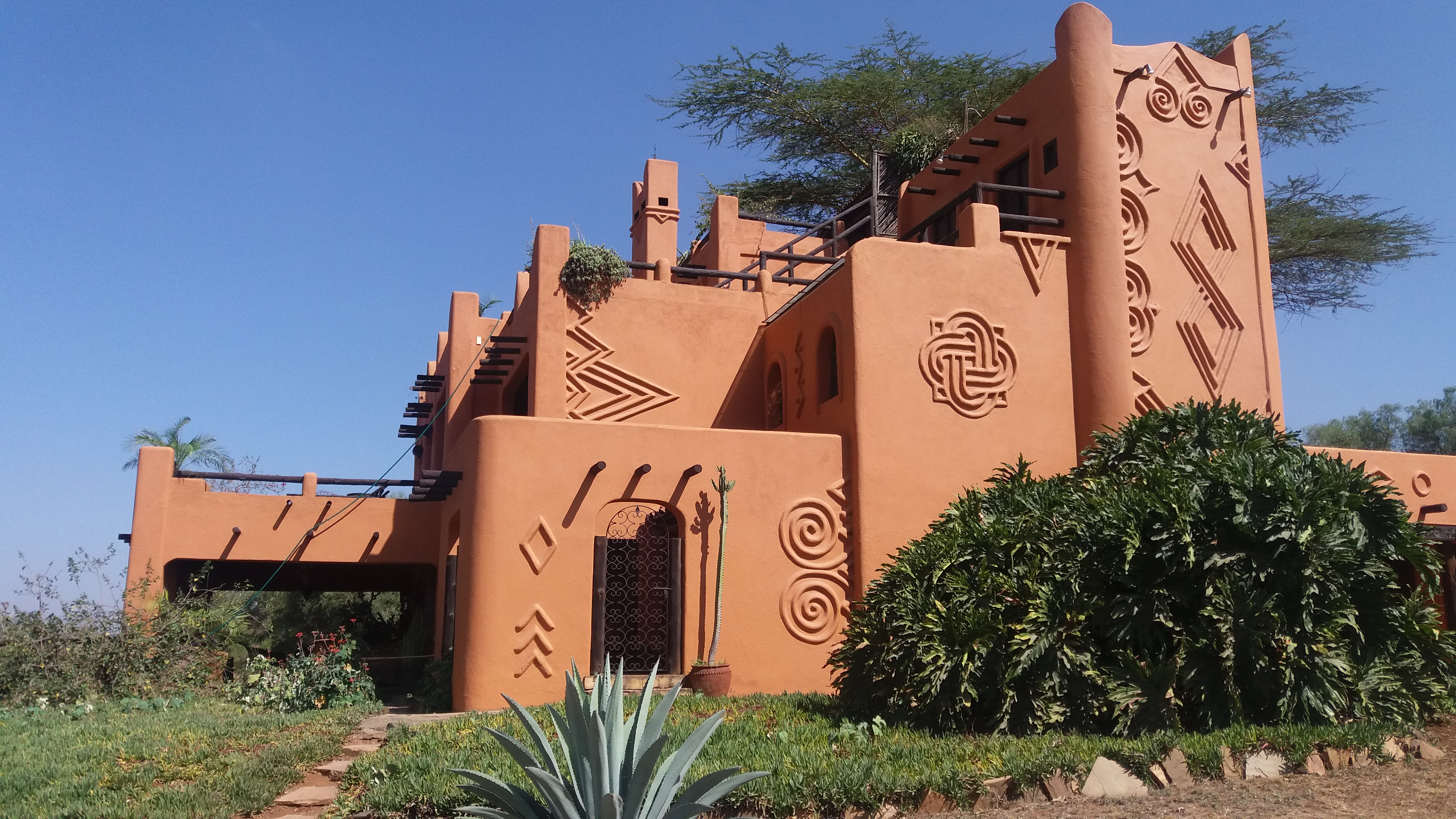

The African Heritage House is a national monument in Kenya, classified and gazetted under the National Museums and Heritage Act in 2016. Designed by Alan Donovan, built to preserve forgotten architectural designs of the African continent. The house is facing the Nairobi national park, and the public can visit the house for a tour, lunches, dinners, events, conferences, and overnight stays.

The house inspiration depicts the towering mud of the Great Mosque of Djenne in Mali, the mud palaces of Morocco, Swahili architecture of the East African coast, Zanzibar and Lamu; and the traditional houses of Ghana and Burkina Faso.

The house has thousands pieces of objects, collections of artworks, artefacts, antique, ceremonial costumes, weaponry, jewellery, textiles, brassware and traditional pottery.

== The History of African Heritage in Kenya ==
In 1970 Alan Donovan arrived in Kenya and spent most of his time with the Turkana people of Northern Kenya. With the collections of art and material culture of the nomadic Turkana tribe, he held his first art exhibition in Nairobi. In attendance at this exhibition were Joseph Murumbi and his wife Sheila. Mr Murumbi was the first Kenyan foreign minister and also served as the second vice president of Kenya. He was an art connoisseur and one of the greatest art collectors of African art and promoted African culture. Thus, African heritage was formed in 1972 by Alan Donovan and Joseph Murumbi. A Gallery where African artists could sell and showcase their works. This would help preserve, promote and protect African art and culture. African Heritage also established a cultural outreach program known as Kenya's African Heritage Festival, with a troupe of models, dancers, musicians, acrobats and others who travelled the world promoting Kenya tourism and African culture showing a collection of authentic African costumes and fashions created from the hand-woven and hand-printed textiles of Africa.

== Incident ==
In the year 2014 African Heritage House was at risk for demolition to pave way for planned standard gauge railway line built by the Kenya government through a Chinese company. The railway line from Mombasa to Nairobi. Fortunately the house was saved through online campaign petition to stop the demolition and the classification of the house as a national monument in Kenya.

== Gallery ==
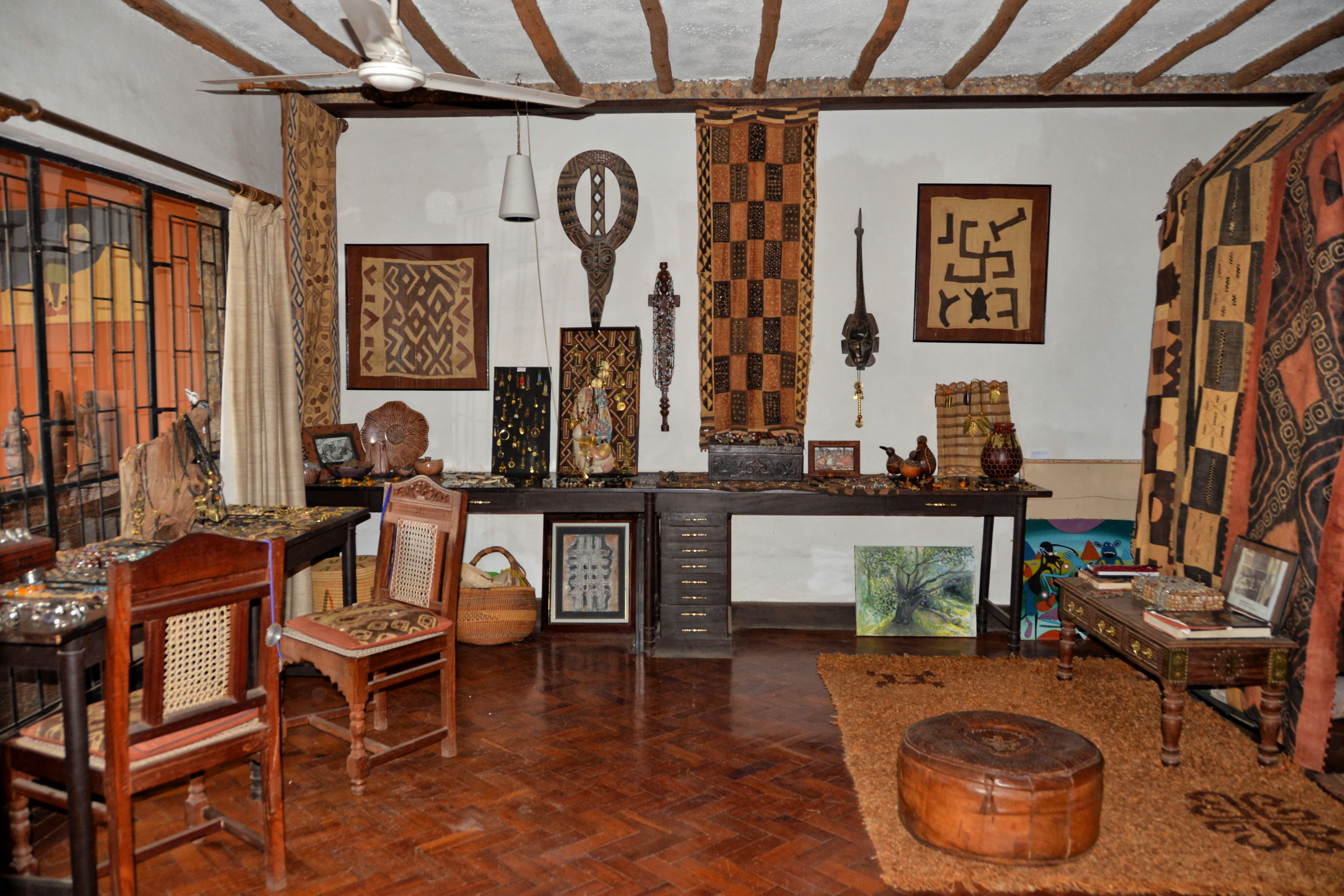

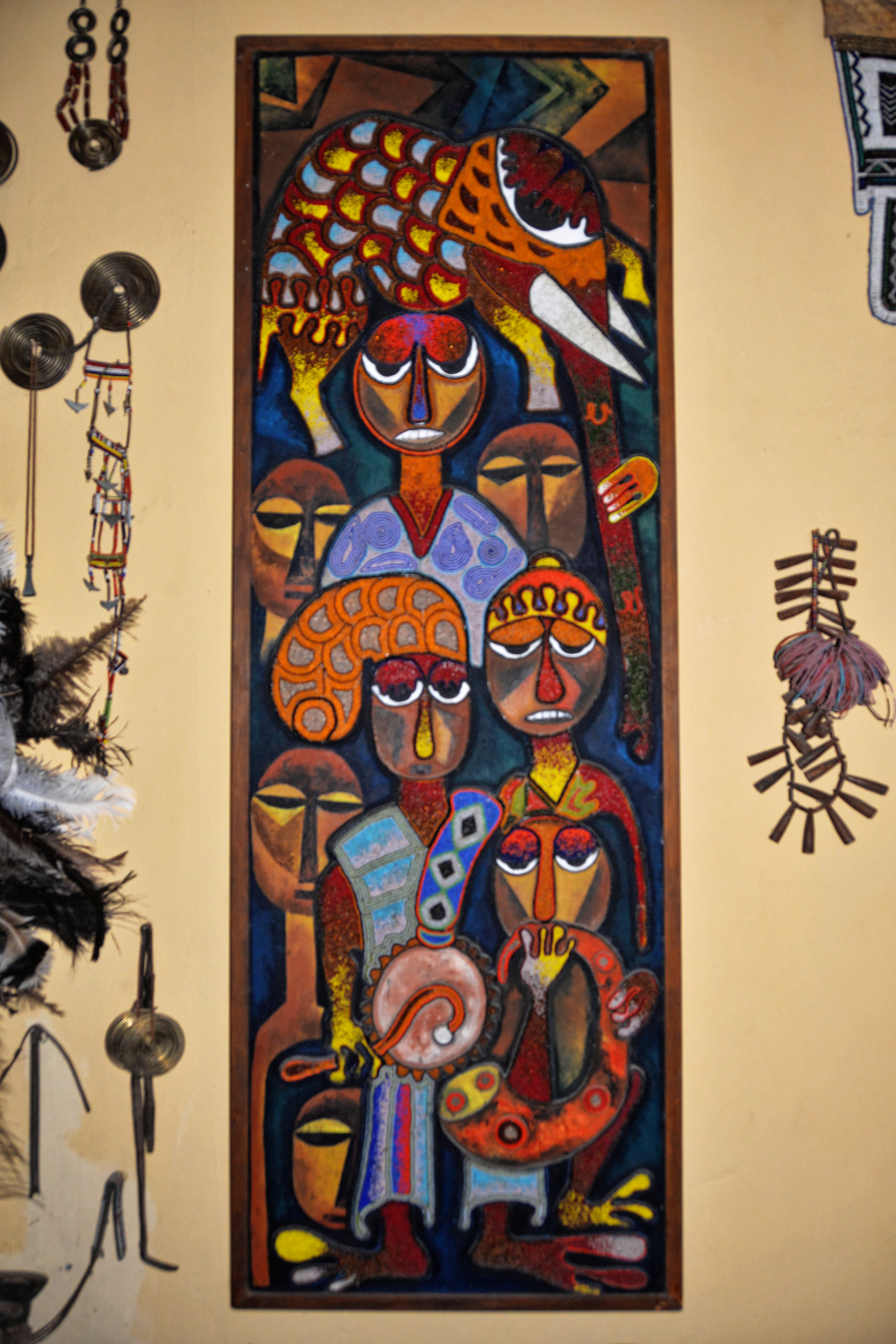

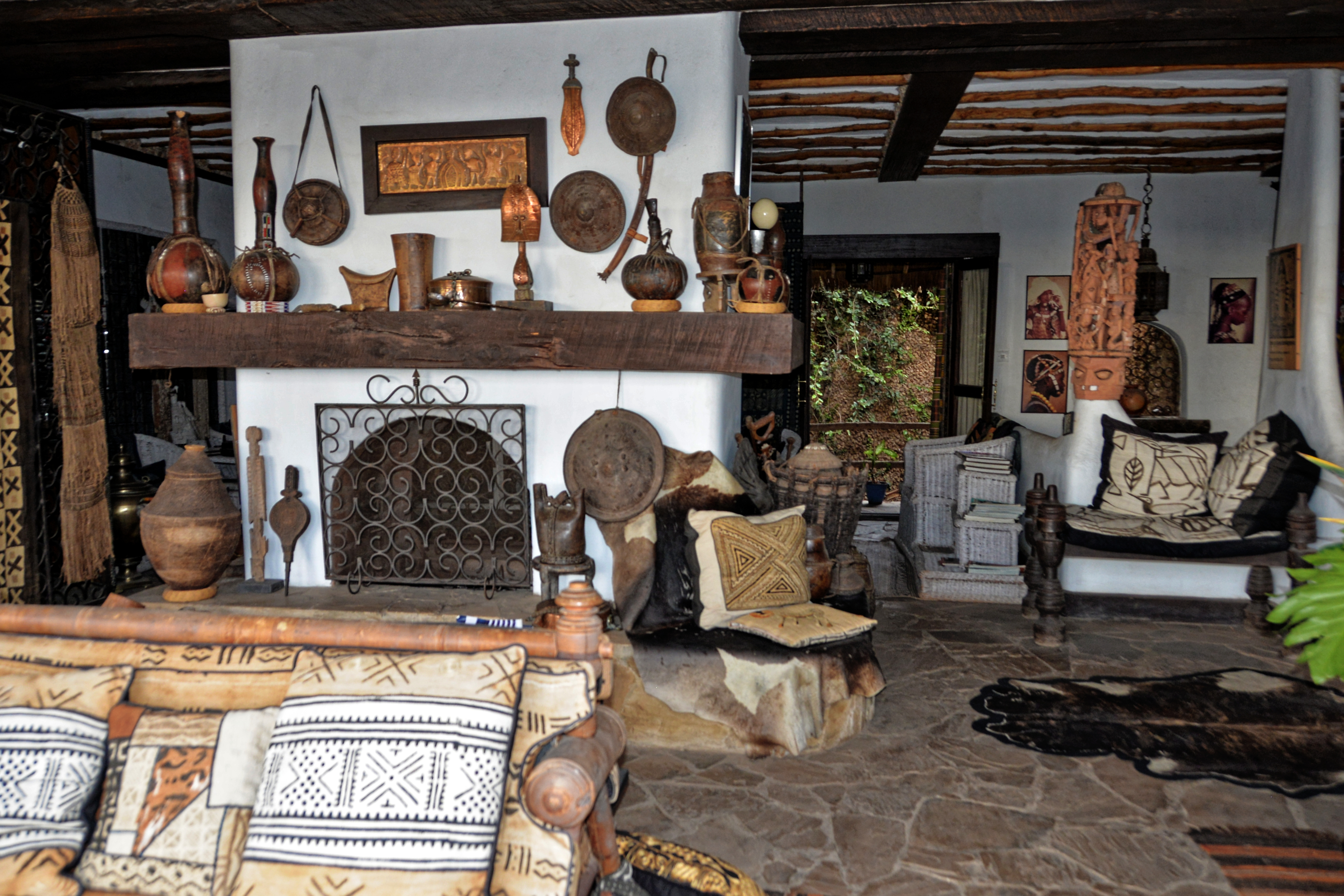

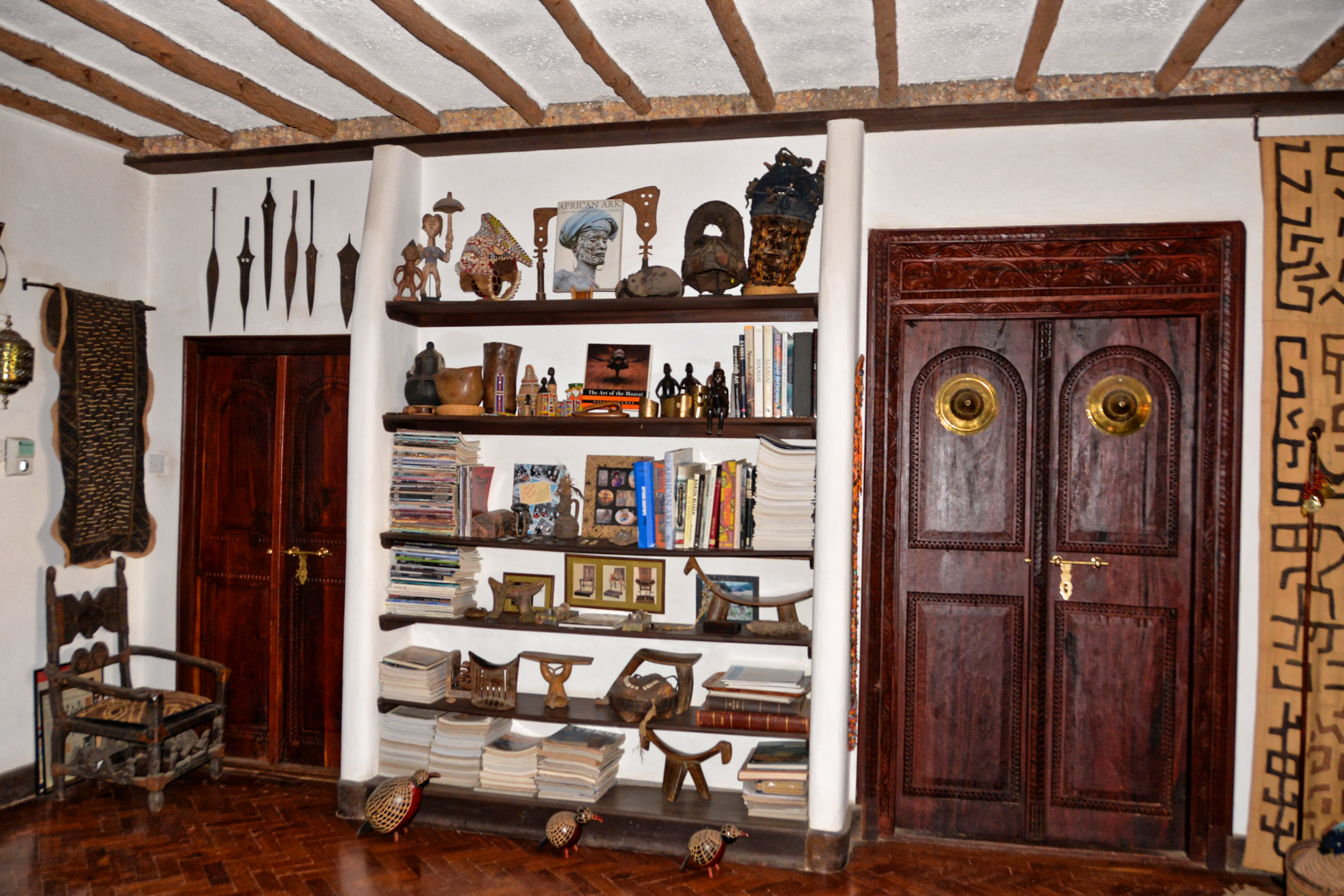

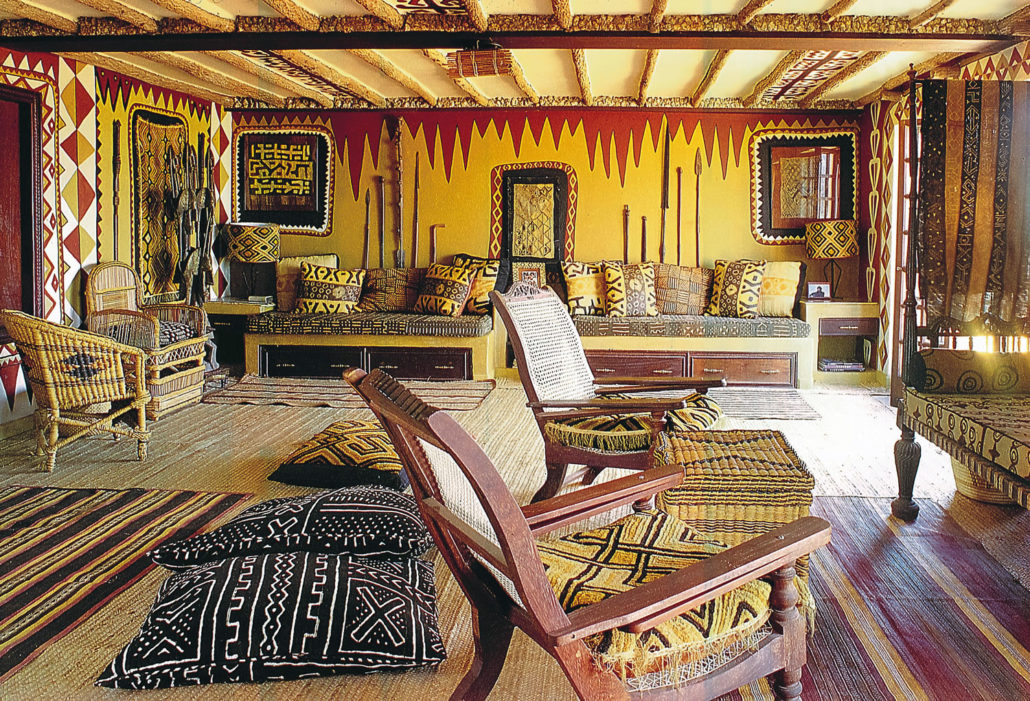
