= Khoja Mosque =

Mosque in Nairobi, Kenya

- Khoja Jamatkhana
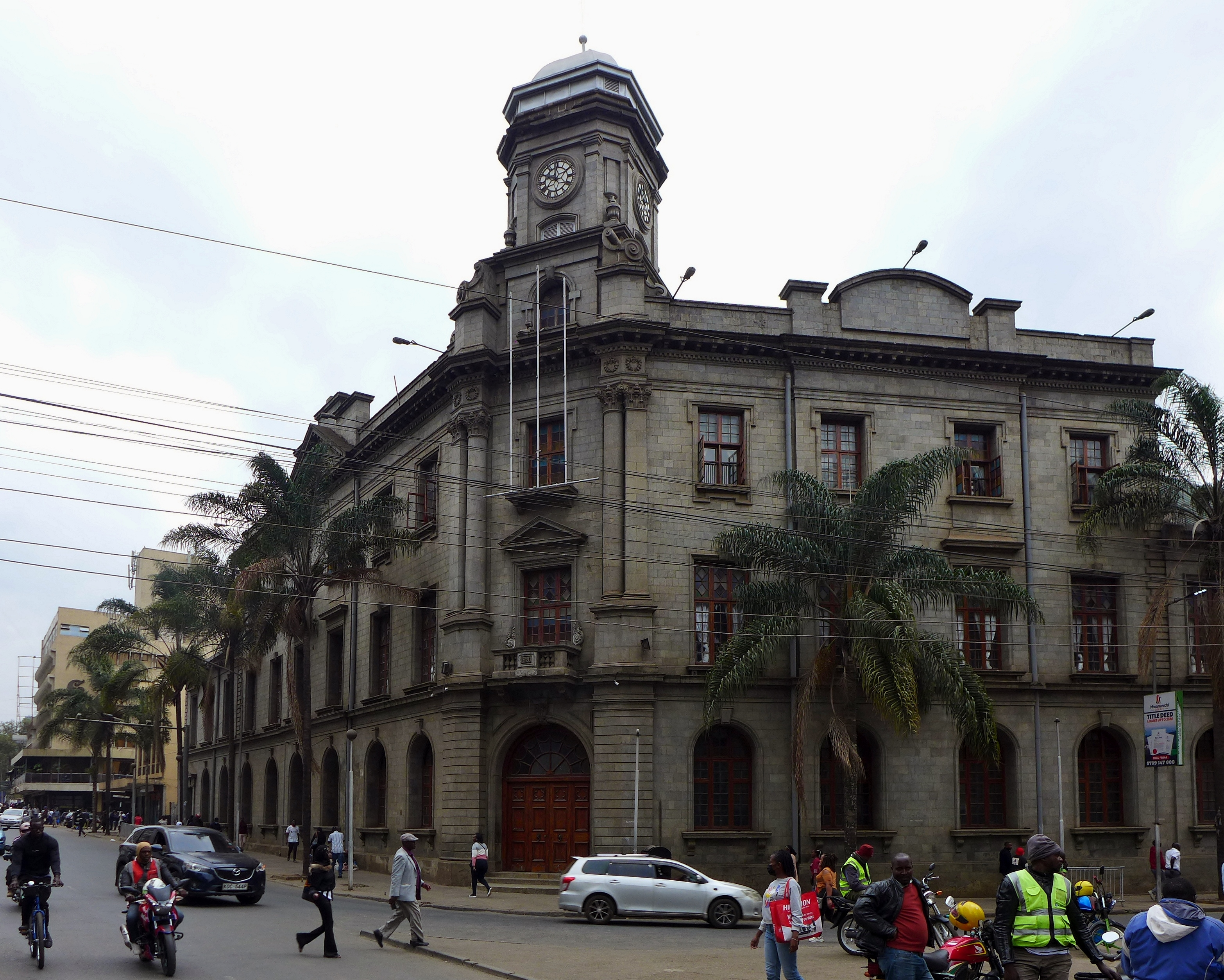
- The mosque in 2025

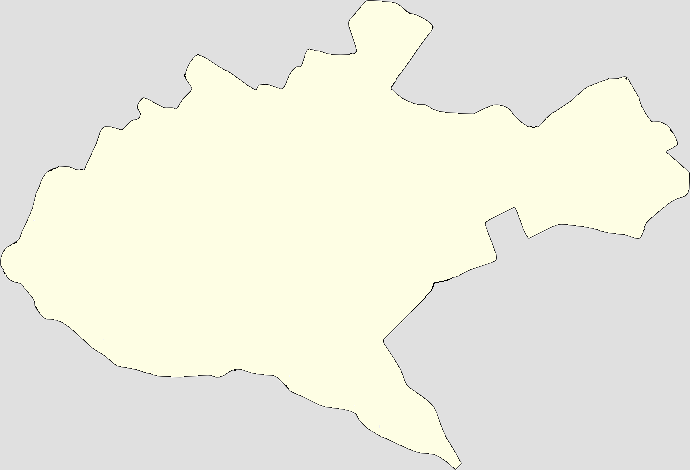
- Location within Nairobi

Religion
- Affiliation: Islam

Location
- Location: 01 River Road, Nairobi, Kenya
- Interactive map of Khoja Mosque
- Coordinates: 1°16′53.4″S 36°49′17.6″E

Architecture
- Type: mosque
- Style: Victorian
- Completed: 1922; 104 years ago

The Khoja Mosque (originally known as Nairobi Town Jamatkhana) is a mosque in Nairobi, Kenya. It is located along the River Road and Moi Avenue junction at the edge of central business district.

== History ==
The mosque was built by the Isma'ilism community led by Aga Khan. The construction was completed on 14 January 1922. It marked its 100th anniversary in 2022. The building was then later declared a national monument by National Museums of Kenya.

== Architecture ==
The mosque was constructed with Victorian architecture style. It is housed in a three-story building.

== See also ==
- Islam in Kenya
- List of mosques in Kenya
