= Mosque of Jesus Christ Son of Mary =

Mosque in Kirinyaga West, Kirinyaga, Kenya

Mosque of Jesus Son of Mary

Religion
- Affiliation: Islam

Location
- Location: Kirinyaga County, Kenya
- Interactive map of Mosque of Jesus Son of Mary
- Coordinates: 0°05′49″S 34°45′54″E

Architecture
- Type: mosque
- Established: 4 July 2021
- Capacity: 500 worshippers

The Mosque of Jesus Son of Mary is a mosque in Kirinyaga West, Kirinyaga County, Kenya.

== History ==
The search for land where the mosque stands today started on 25 September 1985 when the local Muslim association's secretary apply to the Commissioner of Lands to construct a mosque. However, after 12 years of efforts brought no result between the association and the local authority, the association engaged a bank to deal with the matter. In 2010, the Seventh Day Adventist Church moved into the same parcel of land claiming it to be theirs. The local land and environment court eventually gave the right to the Muslim community for the land in October 2020. The Muslim association named the planned mosque as Mosque of Jesus Christ Son of Mary to show goodwill to the local Christian community after the dispute. The construction of the mosque eventually finished and it was opened on 4 July 2021 in a ceremony officiated by executive member of the Muslim World League.

== Architecture ==
The mosque is a single-story building with a capacity of 500 worshippers. It also consists of a madrasa. It was constructed with a total cost of KSh. 15 million.

== See also ==
- Islam in Kenya
- List of mosques in Kenya
