= Tom Mboya Street =

Street in Nairobi, Kenya

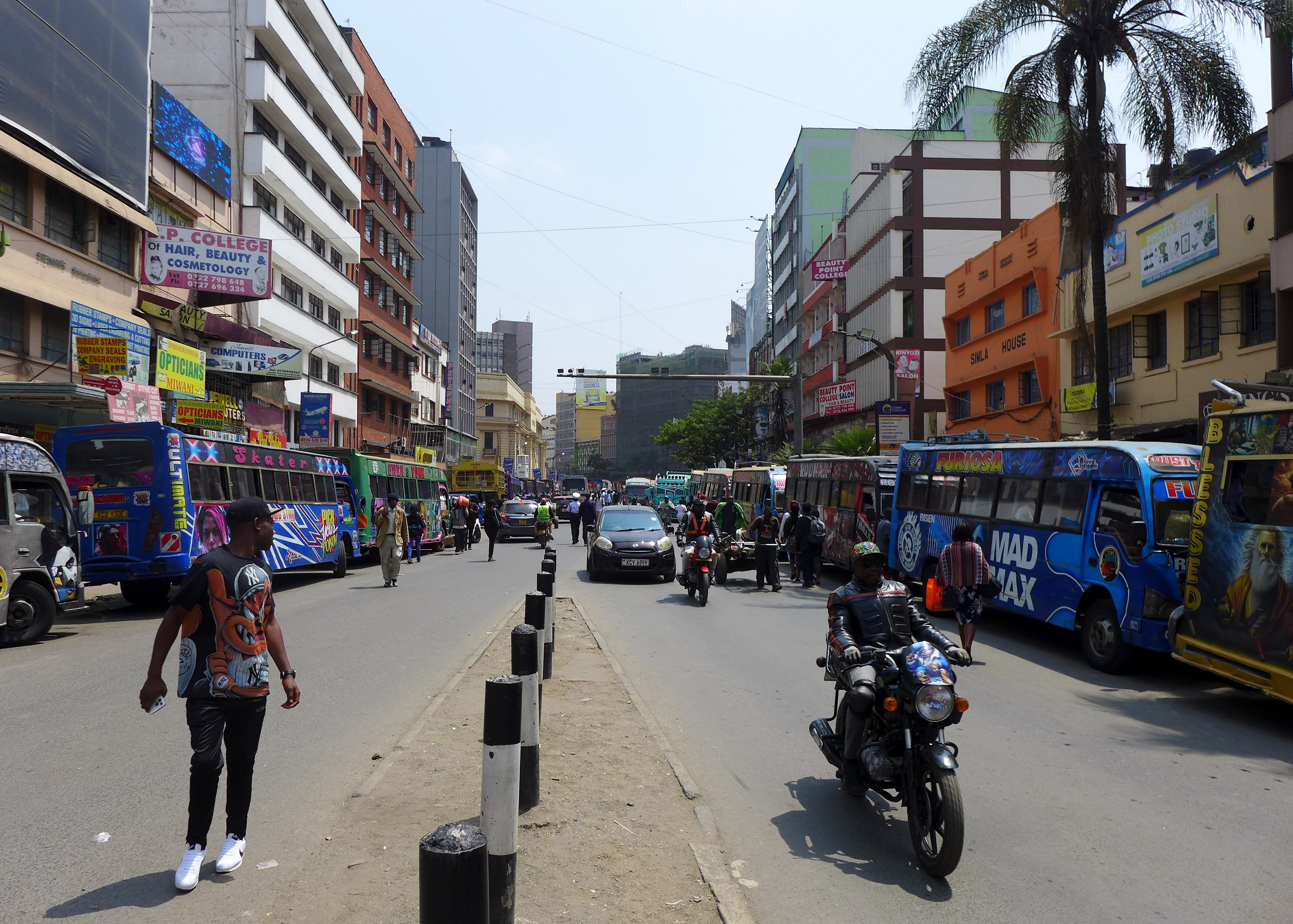
- The street in 2025
- Interactive map of Tom Mboya Street
- Former names: Victoria Street; (to c. 1969)
- Namesake: Tom Mboya
- Type: Main Street
- Location: Nairobi CBD
- Coordinates: 1°17′01″S 36°49′30″E
- Northwestern end: River Road /; Murang'a Road
- Southeastern end: Haile Selassie Avenue

Tom Mboya Street (formerly Victoria Street) is one of the oldest streets in Nairobi. It is one of the major streets in the Central Business District of Nairobi.

== History ==
The initial plan of Nairobi included two wide streets, First Station Road and Victoria Street. The road was named after Queen Victoria, then head of state of the East Africa Protectorate. The street was renamed after Tom Mboya to honour and commemorate the assassinated politician. A monument in his honour is erected on Moi Avenue (formerly Government Road).

Landmarks include the Kenya National Archives.
