= Muhammad Latif Ansari =

Pakistani Muslim scholar, poet and historian (1887–1979)

Khwaja Muhammad Latif Ansari
- Professor Ansari in his latter life
- Title: Hujjat al-Islam

Personal life
- Born: 30 September 1887 AD (12th Muharram 1305 AH) British India
- Died: 1979 AD (aged 92)
- Cause of death: Illness, Partial Paralysis
- Era: 20th Century
- Region: South Asia, Kenya
- Main interest: Islamic History
- Notable work(s): Tārīk̲h̲-i Ḥasan Mujtabá; Karbalā kī kahānī, Qurʼān kī zabānī
- Occupation: Professor, Scholar

Religious life
- Religion: Islam
- Denomination: Shia Islam
- Jurisprudence: Ja'fari
- Creed: Ithna 'asheriyya

Muslim leader
- Influenced: Sayyid Ali Ashgar Razwy

Hujjat al-Islam Professor Khwaja Muhammad Latif Ansari (1887-1979), alternatively spelled Muḥammad Latīf Anṣārī, was a 20th-century Shia Muslim scholar, poet, historian, and cleric from Pakistan.

Ansari was born in British India, but migrated to the newly formed Pakistan immediately after it achieved independence. In Pakistan, he took up residence in the city of Wazirabad. He spent much of his life in Kenya, where he is remembered to this day by the Shia community for bringing active and organized Shi'ism to the country. Ansari spent the last ten years of his life partially paralysed. Although he was a prolific author, many of his books were not published.

== Years in Pakistan ==
Ansari was a member of the Shi'i scholarly community, both in the years leading up to Partition in British India and over the first decade of Pakistani independence. He served as the Secretary-General of the Punjab Shia Conference (PuSC) under British rule in the 1940s, struggling against the passivity of the organization and its inability to extract annual membership dues and regularly publish its weekly journal, Razâkâr. Migrating to Wazirabad after Partition in 1947, Ansari was elected as the first Secretary-General of the All-Pakistan Shia Conference (APSC) in a lively contest.

Ansari was intensely concerned with the state of Shi'i tabligh in these years, writing and speaking extensively on what this phenomenon's implications for the future of the Shi'ism would be. In one article from March 1956, he contends the following:

During the last half century, the spreading of Shi‘ism was encouraging … in this respect we are grateful to the services of the Shia ‘ulamâ’ … who have spared no efforts in serving as unpaid preachers. But now the times have changed and we have to use an organised missionary system on the example of other religious groups for preaching our mazhab, namely the efforts of salaried muballighûn. For tablîgh we are still using our old nazrâna system, therefore we do not have an organised and regular system to preach our mazhab. When we have a closer look at that system, we see the following shortcomings:

1) By this way, even our high-ranking preachers face big difficulties to make their living and do not have a regular salary … if they fall ill, they cannot read majâlis …

2) The nazrâna system creates differences among the Shias, whereas a missionary system will end the rivalry between the preachers …

3) … with a missionary system poor Shias will enjoy the services of preachers in the same way as our better-off brothers … also far-away places where Shias are only a very small minority will be able to take advantage from ‘ulamâ’;

4) the existent system is profitable for some famous ‘ulamâ’, while others, who dedicate their lives to teaching of ‘ulûm-i dînîya do not find the opportunity for sermons; thus ill-will is created between the ‘ulamâ’ …

5) … it keeps the ‘ulamâ’ dependent on the wealthy and powerful people, and they have to make them happy most of the times; sometimes they are even obliged to become the wealthy people’s instruments … the missionary system will free them from this dependency …

6) There are many countries of the world to which the message of the mazhab-i ahl-i bait has not yet arrived and where there is no hope of nazrâna; with a missionary system we will be able to fulfil our holy duty to spread the message of the Prophet Muhammad and his ahl-i bait to foreign countries …

== Migration to Kenya ==
Ansari left South Asia for Kenya in the 1950s, fulfilling his dream of preaching to distant, foreign Shi'i communities that he mentions in the above quote. He was already a reputed cleric by that time, but nevertheless joined a number of scholars coming from South Asia into the relatively unheard of Shia community of Kenya. After becoming a resident alim there, Ansari helped the community to become large and prosperous as it is today. He is remembered to this day in the country for an address he delivered at the Arusha Conference in December 1958, in which he emphasized the need for tabligh. A large amount of his efforts were focused on the Khoja community.

== Legacy ==
Scholars in Canada, United States, Iran, Pakistan, and Kenya, among other places, have used his works as source material.

== Publications ==
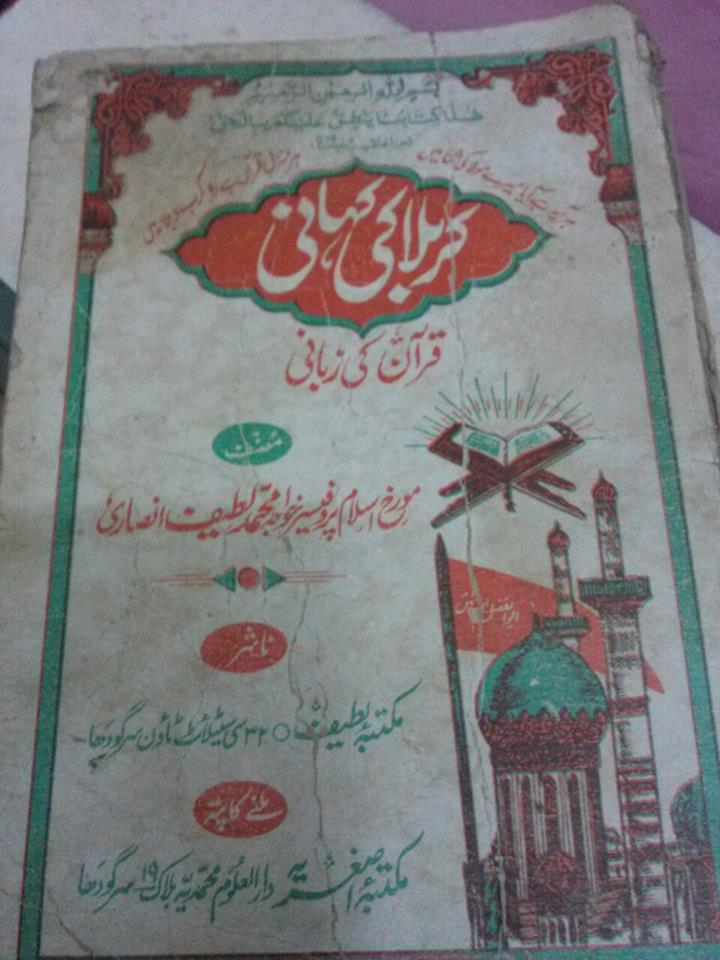
A copy of Karbalā kī kahānī, Qurʼān kī zabānī in Urdu

Most of his writings are in Urdu. His works today survive in several university catalogs and libraries.

Ansari is also mentioned as a source in "A Restatement of the History of Islam and Muslims" by Sayyid Ali Ashgar Razwy.

Some of his publications are as follows:

- Islam Aur Musalmano Ki Tareekh (The History of Islam and Muslims)
- Tārīk̲h̲-i Ḥasan Mujtabá (History of Al-Hasan Al-Mujtaba)
- Shazada-e-Yathrib Alam-e-Hijrat Mein
- Ma'arejal Irfan
- Karbalā kī kahānī, Qurʼān kī zabānī (The Story of Karbala in the words of the Qur'an).

== See also ==
- Islam
- Shia Islam in Pakistan
- Shia Islam in Kenya
- Khoja
