= Bomas International Convention Centre =

Convention Centre in Nairobi, Kenya

Bomas International Convention Centre (BICC), also referred to as the Bomas International Convention Complex, is a conference and exhibition complex under construction at Bomas of Kenya in Nairobi, Kenya. It is designed to accommodate up to 11,000 delegates.

== Construction ==
The Government of Kenya approved the project in August 2023. Construction began in March 2025 under the supervision of the Kenya Defence Forces.

Completion of the main convention centre is scheduled for December 2026.

== Facilities ==
The planned facilities include a 5,000-seat convention hall, a 3,500-seat auditorium, a ballroom with a 2,500 people capacity, and more than 20 meeting rooms.
