= Joseph Murumbi =

2nd Vice President of Kenya

The Honourable Joseph Zuzarte Murumbi E.G.H.

2nd Vice President of Kenya
- In office 3 May 1966 – 30 November 1966
- President: Jomo Kenyatta
- Preceded by: Jaramogi Oginga Odinga
- Succeeded by: Daniel arap Moi

Personal details
- Born: Joseph Murumbi-Zuzarte; 18 June 1911
- Died: 22 June 1990 (aged 79) Nairobi, Kenya
- Party: Kenya African Union
- Occupation: Politician

Joseph Zuzarte Murumbi (born Joseph Murumbi-Zuzarte; 18 June 1911 – 22 June 1990) was a Kenyan politician who was the Minister of Foreign Affairs of the Republic of Kenya from 1964 to 1966, and its second Vice-President between May and December 1966.

== Early life ==
Murumbi was born as Joseph Anthony Zuzarte Murumbi (1911-22 June 1990 Nairobi). He was the son of a Goan trader, Peter Nicholas Zuzarte, by Njiambiak Murumbi, Masaai lady, daughter of Murumbi a Maasai Laibon from Uasin Gishu. His parents broke up when he was a toddler. His father married had a first wife, Ezalda Clara Albuquerque. He was then sent away to India for his schooling at the age of six. He went to Good Shepherd Convent School and then St. Joseph's High School, both in Bangalore. He completed his schooling at St. Pancras European Boys High School in Bellary.

In an interview, Murumbi shared the following:

"My father, Peter Zuzarte, was from an old landed Goan family who lived in a place called Giri. In his day well-to-do families could afford to have a priest and a chapel in the house, which my father's family had. In the chapel there were jewels and ornaments worth a great deal of money, and the priest, who studied Latin and Greek, administered the household. My father, however, wanted to go abroad, and when he heard that clerks were being hired for work in East Africa, he applied for a job and was selected to come by Mackinnon Mackenzie, the recruiting agent in Bombay

From Bombay he travelled to Aden in a P&O boat and by a German boat to Zanzibar. From there he sailed by dhow to Mombasa, arriving in Africa for the first time in 1897. He then walked to Baringo Station which was at the time in Uganda Province. In Baringo he served as a district clerk under Geoffrey Archer, the District Officer, who later on became Governor-General of Sudan.

Q. How long did he work at Baringo?

A. I don't know any dates, but from Baringo he was posted to Naivasha which was also in Uganda Province, on the border, and from there he went to Eldama Ravine. Q. As a clerk?

A. Initially as a clerk, but then he gave up his job and started his own shop. It was in Eldama Ravine that he met my mother. I don't know the circumstances, and it was there that I was born, in 1911. Later we moved to Londiani where he again set up a shop.

Q. What was your mother's family background?

A. My mother grew up in the Eldama Ravine area. She was the daughter of Murumbi, the Laibon of the Uasin Gishu Maasai.”

== Political career ==
After returning to Kenya from England, where he had worked as a translator for the Moroccan Embassy in London, Murumbi became a member of the Kenya African Union political party, amidst a political ferment in East Africa caused by the beginning of the withdrawal from the African continent of the British Empire. A declaration of the State of Emergency in Kenya on 20 October 1952 saw the detention of senior figures of the Kenya African Union's leadership, and Murumbi found himself thrust into the center of the party's leadership as its acting Secretary-General. He played a key role in securing legal counsel for the detainees arrested in the emergency crackdown, and, together with Pio Gama Pinto, raised objections to the continuance of British Imperial dominion in Kenya through Indian newspapers such as the Chronicle. In March 1953, however, Murumbi was forced to flee the country to avoid arrest by the British authorities. With the assistance of the Indian High Commissioner Apa Pant, Murumbi flew to India on an agricultural scholarship and spent time in India, Egypt and the United Kingdom building political connections and raising awareness of the detentions of prominent Kenyans by British authorities. Murumbi spent much of this period working with sympathetic nationalists in the Indian Government, which allowed him to write extensively in the Indian press and broadcast on All India Radio.

== Ministerial career ==
After Kenya became independent of British imperial rule in 1963, Murumbi participated in the writing of its first governmental constitution, and held the office of its Minister of Foreign Affairs from 1964 to 1966, touring the globe to set up numerous ambassadorial offices in foreign capitals for the newly created nation. He subsequently served as the Republic's Vice President in a government led by Jomo Kenyatta in 1966 for nine months. However, around this time Murumbi became uneasy with what he perceived as Kenyatta's increasing authoritarianism in dealing with political opponents, and the increasing corruption that he witnessed rapidly developing within the new Kenyan government order, and subsequently his concerns were borne out when Kenyatta began to use government power to engage in land grabbing in the late 1960s and 1970s. Murumbi also became further alienated from the new Kenyan governing order when Pio Gama Pinto, a close personal friend and key political philosophical mentor of Murumbi's, was murdered in April 1965 after he had become a public critic of it. As Pheroze Nowrojee stated:

The assassination of Pinto illustrated to Murumbi the shocking extent to which the new government had departed from its promises. His feeling, evidently, was that these were not the principles for which so many had suffered, and his departure (from the new political order in power) was only a matter of time.

After resigning from the office of the Vice-President in November 1966 through which was officially announced at the time to be on account of ill health, Murumbi withdrew from politics.

== Later life ==
After leaving politics Murumbi became the acting chairman of the Kenyan National Archives, and later co-founded 'African Heritage' with Alan Donovan, which went on to become the largest Pan-African art gallery on the continent.

== Death ==
In 1982 he seriously injured himself in a fall at his home, and was reliant upon a wheelchair in his final years. He died on 22 June 1990 in his 79th year. Murumbi's body was buried in Nairobi City Park. The unmarked grave was subject to neglect, vandalism and theft through the late 1990s and early 2000s, and had at one time been threatened with being lost altogether when a building development scheme was considered for the site of the grave, until it was protected by the creation around it of a memorial garden named after him.

== Personal life ==
Murumbi married Sheila, a librarian whom he met whilst he was a political exile from Kenya in England in the late 1950s. They lived in Kenya subsequently on an estate in the Muthaiga district. She died in 2003.

== Legacy ==
He was an avid art collector, and during his life acquired over 50,000 books and sheaves of official correspondence. The Kenya National Archives established a library containing some of the 8000 rare books (published before 1900) entrusted to them upon the death of Murumbi. The Kenya National Archives also created the 'Murumbi Gallery' within the same building, displaying the different African artifacts that were collected by him through his life.

Political offices
Preceded by Jaramogi Oginga Odinga	Vice-President of Kenya; May 1966–August 31, 1966	Succeeded by Daniel arap Moi
