= Kenya Law Reports =

The Kenya Law Reports are the official law reports of the Republic of Kenya which may be cited in proceedings in all courts of Kenya (section 21 of the Act). The enactment of the National Council for Law Reporting Act arose from the need to bridge the gap that existed in official law reporting and to institutionalize law reporting within Kenya's government structure. The council was established on 20 May 1996 under the chairmanship of Abdul Majid Cockar, then Chief Justice. The first volume of the re-launched Kenya Law Reports, the [1981] KLR, was released on 11 January 2002. The council has published 11 years of this backlog (1981–1991) and simultaneously published law reports for years (2001–2004). In 2006, the Council commenced the publication of specialized law reports that presented the varied subjects of law, beginning with Environment and Land Law reports.
