= Mlolongo =

- Town
- Location in Kenya
- Coordinates: 1°23′S 36°55′E
- Country: Kenya
- County: Machakos

Population (2019 Census)
  - Total: 136,351
- Time zone: UTC+3 (EAT)

Mlolongo is a township in Machakos County, Kenya. Its population was estimated at 136,000 people in 2019. It is a satellite city near Nairobi along the Nairobi Expressway and part of the Nairobi metropolitan area.

== Economy ==
Majority of the dwellers there depend on businesses.
