= Kenya National Archives =

National archives of Kenya

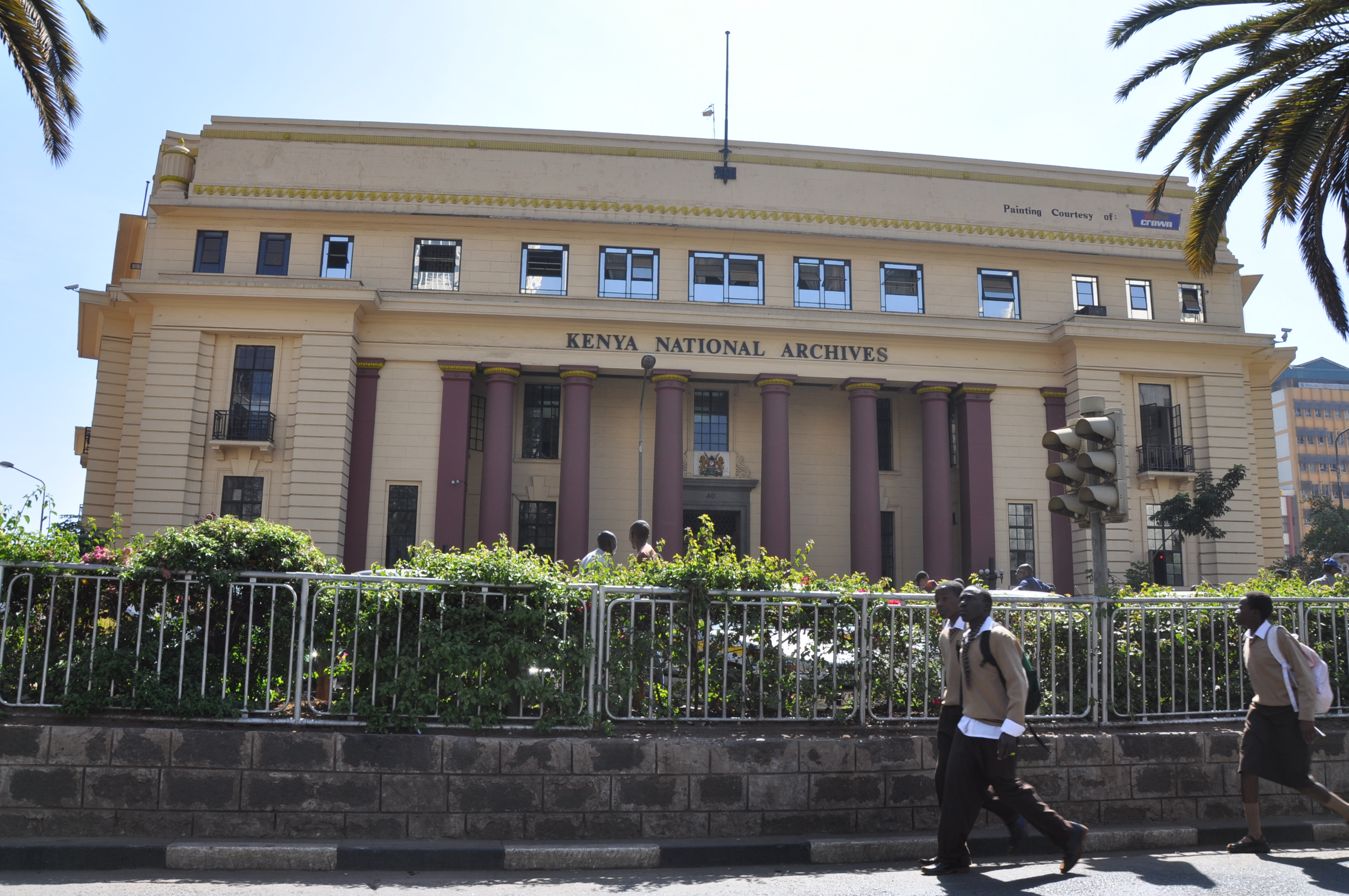
- The Kenya National Archives

General information
- Location: 30 Moi Avenue, Nairobi, Kenya, Nairobi, Kenya
- Coordinates: 1.2850134°S 36.8258255°E
- Opened: 1965; 61 years ago
- Owner: National Museums of Kenya

Website
- www.archives.go.ke

The Kenya National Archives and Documentation Services (KNADS) is situated at the edge of the central business district in downtown Nairobi along Moi Avenue next to Ambassadeur Hotel. The archives look out on the landmark Hilton Hotel, while on the rear side is Tom Mboya street. It was established in 1965 in a building that initially housed the Kenya Commercial Bank. It holds 40,000 volumes. It was established by an Act of the Parliament of Kenya in 1965 and was placed under the office of the Vice President and the Minister of Home Affairs. It is currently under the office of the Vice-President and State Department for National Heritage and Culture. The Kenya National Archives building also houses the Murumbi Gallery which contains African artifacts that were collected in the 19th century.

== Murumbi Gallery ==
The gallery is situated at the ground floor of the Kenya National Archives building and it is named after Joseph Murumbi, who was the second vice president of Kenya. It is currently the largest Pan-African art gallery in Africa and it contains ancient art collections from different regions and communities of Africa.

Afraid that Murumbi might dispose his collections to a foreign buyer the then 1st Black Director of the Archives Dr Maina David Kagombe published a gazette notice in March 1976 Stopping anyone including Murumbi from selling aboard any items the Director considered to be antiquities of Natural Cultural Value.

Murumbi was forced to sell his collection and Muthaiga Home to the government of Kenya.

The collected artifacts were acquired by the government of Kenya after a concessionary arrangement was agreed upon with Joseph Murumbi, who had initially turned down several huge offers to buy his collections by overseas bidders.

== See also ==
- List of national archives

== Bibliography ==
- Robert G. Gregory; et al. (1968), Guide to the Kenya National Archives, USA, OCLC 180356779
- Musila Musembi (1985), Archives management, the Kenyan experience, Nairobi, OCLC 17506945
- Government of Kenya (1990), Public Archives and Documentation Service Act, Cap 19 – via Kenyalaw.org
- Matthew Carotenuto and Katherine Luongo (2005). "Navigating the Kenya National Archives: Research and its Role in Kenyan Society". History in Africa. 32 – via Project MUSE.
