= Moi Avenue (Nairobi) =

Major road in Nairobi, Kenya

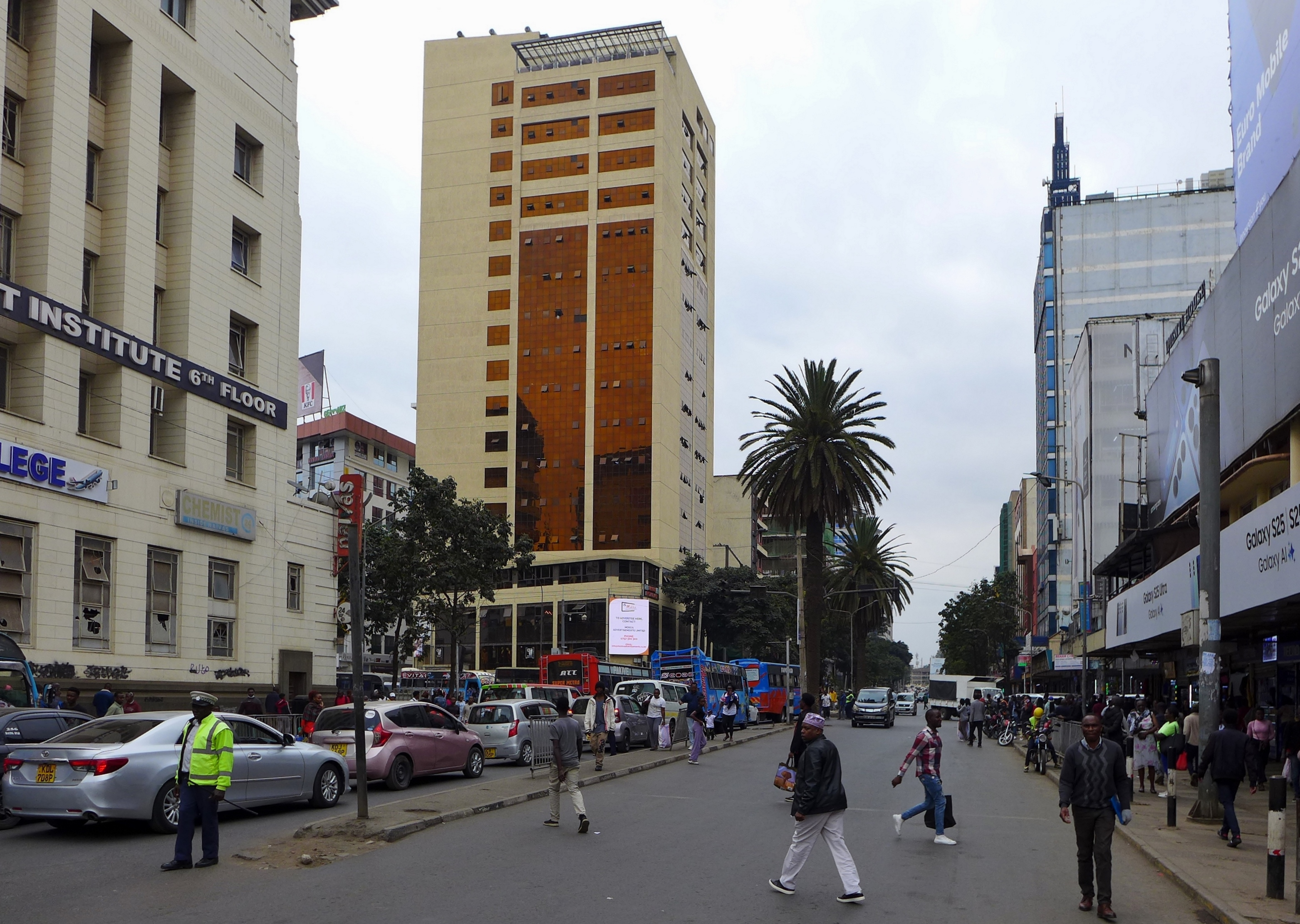
- Moi Avenue near its intersection with Kenyatta Avenue in 2025
- Interactive map of Moi Avenue
- Former names: First Station Road; (to 1901); Government Road; (1901–1979)
- Namesake: Daniel arap Moi
- Type: Main Street
- Location: Nairobi CBD
- Coordinates: 1°17′00″S 36°49′25″E
- Northwestern end: Harry Thuku Road /; Muindi Mbingu Street
- Southeastern end: Haile Selassie Avenue

Moi Avenue (formerly First Station Road and Government Road) is a major road inside the Central Business District of Nairobi. It is one of the oldest roads in Nairobi and is intersected by Kenyatta Avenue, City-Hall Way and Haile Selassie Avenue, running West to East.

== History ==
The road was one of the two initial roads, together with Victoria Street, built in Nairobi. It was initially known as First Station Road as it was the road on which Nairobi Railway Station was located. The road quickly became home to many government offices and buildings, and in 1901 it was renamed Government Road. Politician Tom Mboya was gunned down on Government Road on 5 July 1969 and there is a monument in his memory in front of Hilton Park. The road was later renamed Moi Avenue, for Daniel arap Moi, after Kenya's independence as a sign of nationalism.

Landmarks include Jeevanjee Gardens, Khoja Mosque, Moi University, Hilton Park, and many commercial facilities.
