= Islam in Kenya =

Islam in Kenya

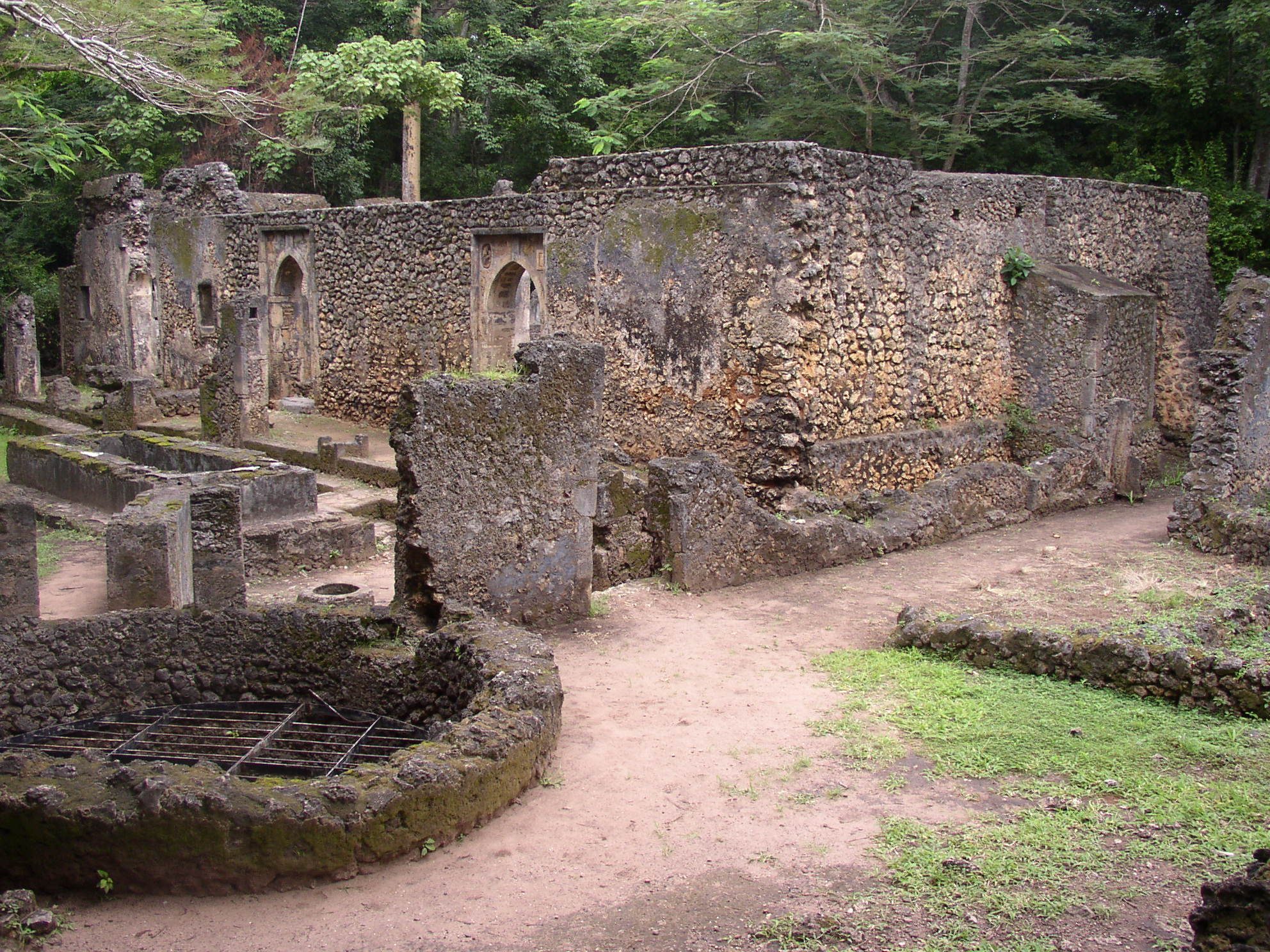
The Great Mosque of Gedi.

Islam is the second largest faith in Kenya representing 11% of the Kenyan population, or approximately 5.2 million people as of the 2019 census. The North eastern and the Kenyan coast have the highest proportion of Muslims in Kenya. Nairobi has several mosques and a notable Muslim population. The faith was introduced by merchants visiting the Swahili coast, which led to local conversions and foreign Muslims becoming assimilated. This would later result in the emergence of several officially Muslim political entities in the region.

The majority of Muslims in Kenya are Sunni Muslims forming 81% of the Muslim Population, 7% identify as Shia. There are also sizeable populations of Ibadism, Ahmadiyya and Quranist adherents. In large part, Shias are Ismailis descended from or influenced by oceanic traders from the Middle East and India. These Shia Muslims include the Dawoodi Bohra, who number some 6,000–8,000 in the country. As for the orthodox Twelver Shia presence in Kenya, twentieth-century Pakistani scholar Khwaja Muhammad Latif Ansari played an important role in proselytisation for the resident Khoja community.

== Historical overview ==
=== Islamic arrival on the Swahili Coast ===
Muslim merchants arrived on the Swahili Coast around the eighth century. The tension following the death of Mohammad, the prophet of Islam, and the already established trade links between the Persian Gulf and the Swahili Coast were some of the factors leading to this development.

Archaeological evidence attests to a thriving Muslim town on Manda Island by the tenth century AD. The Moroccan Muslim traveller, Ibn Battuta, visiting the Swahili Coast in 1331 AD, reported a strong Muslim presence. Ibn Battuta said: The inhabitants are pious, honourable, and upright, and they have well-built wooden mosques.

On arrival, the Muslims settled along the coast, engaging in trade. The Shirazi intermarried with the local Bantu people resulting in the Swahili people, most of whom converted to Islam. Swahili, structurally a Bantu Language with heavy borrowings from Arabic, was born.

Primarily, Islam spread through the interactions of individuals, with the Arab Muslims who had settled in small groups maintaining their culture, and religious practices. Despite encountering local communities, Islam was not ‘indigenised’ along the patterns of the local Bantu communities. Nevertheless, Islam grew through absorption of individuals into the newly established Afro-Arabic Muslim communities. This resulted in more ‘Swahilization’ than Islamization.

There was strong resistance toward Islam by the majority of communities living in the interior. The resistance was because conversion was an individual act, leading to detribalisation and integration into the Muslim community going against the socially acceptable communal life.

Islam on the Swahili Coast was different from the rest of Africa. Unlike West Africa where Islam was integrated to the local communities, the local Islam was ‘foreign’; the Arab-Muslims lived as if they were in the Middle East.

The primary concern for the early Muslims was trade with a few interested in propagating Islam. The arrival of the Portuguese in the fifteenth century interrupted the small work in progress. On the other hand, the interstate quarrels that ensued meant that much effort was now directed towards restoring normality and not Islamization.

=== The spread of Islam into the interior ===
Islam remained an urban and coastal phenomenon. The Spread of Islam was low-keyed with no impact amongst the local non-Swahili African Community. There were no intermediary Africans to demonstrate that, adoption of a few Islamic institutions would not disrupt society.

The spread of Islam to the interior was hampered by several factors: for instance, the nature of the Bantu society's varied beliefs, and scattered settlements affected interior advancement. Other factors included, harsh climatic conditions, the fierce tribes like the Maasai, tribal laws restricting passage through their land, health factors, and the lack of an easy mode of transportation. For Trimingham, the brand of Islam introduced to the region was equally to blame.

Muslim traders were not welcome in the social structures thereby impeding any meaningful progress until the beginning of European occupation.

Other factors affecting Islamic movement into the interior included atrocities committed during slave trading, as these unfavourably affected the spread of Islam. In addition, the embracing of Islam by large portions of coastal tribes in the nineteenth century aided in its spread.

Besides, local Muslim preachers and teachers played major roles in teaching religion (Ar. dīn) and the Qur’ān at the Qur’ān Schools (Swa. vyuo) and madrasa attached to the mosques.

The coming of the second wave of Europeans, in the nineteenth century, brought mixed fortunes to the coastal Muslims, their strong sense of pride and belonging was greatly diminished, with efforts being redirected to self adjustments.

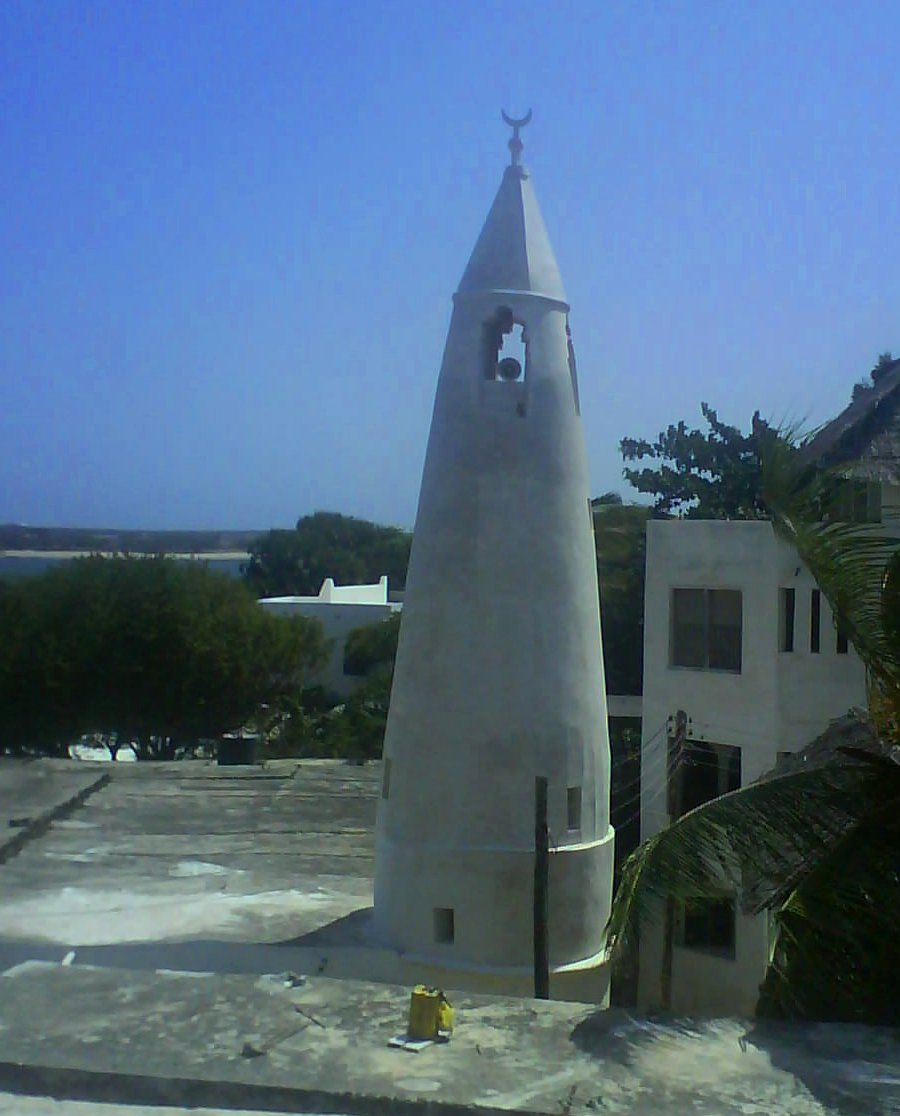
A mosque on Lamu Island.

Nonetheless, Muslim agents deployed by Europeans as subordinate labourers to assist in the establishment of colonial administration centres, were advantageously placed throughout the country, bringing the Islamic influence to the interior. Each place where a European installed himself, military camp, government centre, or plantation, was a centre for Muslim influence.

In the interior, the Muslims neither integrated nor mingled with the local communities, yet non-Swahili Africans began joining the Swahili trends in trade with some returning as Muslims. Swahili became the trade and religious language. Alongside the interpersonal contacts, intermarriages also yielded some conversions.

Although coastal rulers did not send missionaries to the interior, local Africans embraced Islam freely through attraction to the religious life of the Muslims. Close integration with the local population helped to foster good relations resulting in Islam gaining a few converts, based on individual efforts.

Subjectively, most of the surrounding Bantu communities had a close-knit religious heritage, requiring strong force to penetrate. The pacification and consolidation by European powers provided the much-needed force to open up the communities for new structures of power and religious expression (Trimingham: 1983:58)

Progress in the spread of Islam in Kenya came between 1880 and 1930. Widespread social and political upheavals unsettled established structures and ways of life, leading communities to navigate and incorporate new ideas and practices.

Consequently, Islam introduced new religious values through external ceremonial and ritualistic expressions, some of which could be followed with no difficulty.

Socio-culturally, Muslims presented themselves with a sense of pride and a feeling of superiority. Islamic civilisation was identified with the Arab way of life (Ustaarabu), as opposed to ‘barbarianism’ (Ushenzi) hence the domination of a form of Arabism over the local variety of Islam.

The ease, with which Islam could be adopted, meant adding to the indigenous practices, new religious rites and ceremonies to the African ways, with new ways of defining one's identity by new forms of expression. Mingling with Muslims led to conversion meaning returning home as Muslims and not aliens. Lacunza-Balda shows that Islam could be adopted easily.

Although most of the conversions were of individuals, there were communities that embraced Islam en-masse. Some of these included the Digo and Pokomo of the Lower Tana region. From these communities Islam slowly penetrated inland.

=== Organised missionary activities ===
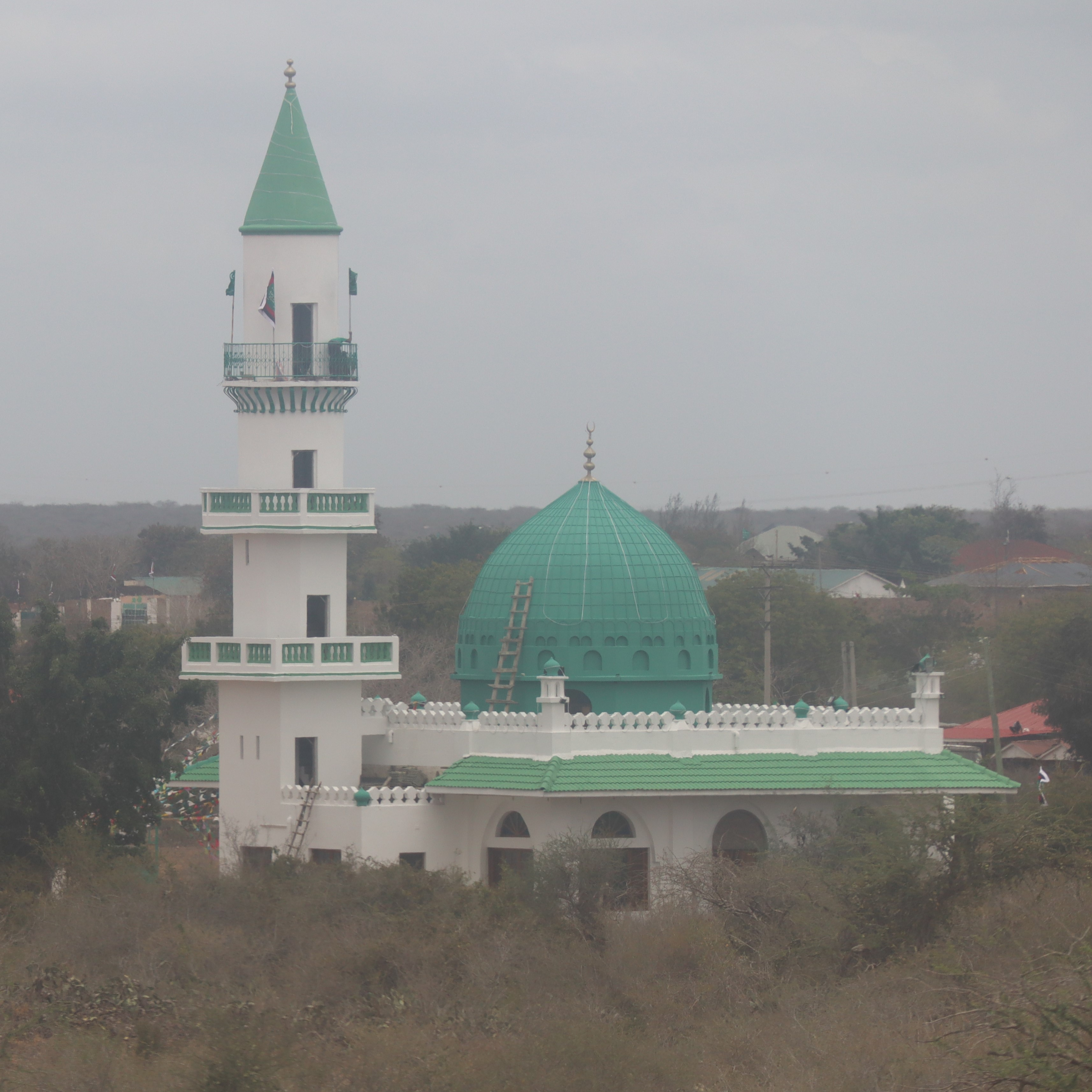
A mosque in 2022 on the railroad between Mombasa and Nairobi.

Pioneer Muslim missionaries to the interior were largely Tanganyikans, who coupled their missionary work with trade, along the centres began along the railway line, such as, Kibwezi, Makindu, and Nairobi.

Outstanding amongst them was Maalim Mtondo, a Tanganyikan credited with being the first Muslim missionary to Nairobi. Reaching Nairobi at the close of the nineteenth century, he led a group of other Muslims and enthusiastic missionaries from the coast to establish a ‘Swahili village’ in the present-day Pumwani.

A small mosque was built to serve as a starting point, and he began preaching Islam in earnest. He soon attracted several Kikuyus and Wakambas, who became his disciples.

Local men converted and having learned from their teachers took up the leadership of religious matters. Khamis Ngige was a prominent local convert of the early outreach. Having learned from Maalim Mtondo, he later became the Imam of the Pumwani Mosque. Different preachers scattered in the countryside from 1900 to 1920, introducing Islam to areas around, Mt. Kenya, Murang’a, Embu, Meru, Nyeri and Kitui. This serious missionary move interior was out of personal enthusiasm with the influence being highly localised. Only a few Africans were converted, and the impact was short lived.

One example of Shia missionary efforts in Kenya is the work of twentieth-century Pakistani scholar Khwaja Muhammad Latif Ansari. Ansari left South Asia for Kenya in the 1950s, fulfilling his dream of preaching to distant, foreign Shi'i communities. He was already a reputed cleric by that time, but nevertheless joined a number of scholars coming from South Asia into the relatively unheard of Shia community of Kenya. After becoming a resident alim there, Ansari helped the community to become large and prosperous as it is today. He is remembered to this day in the country for an address he delivered at the Arusha Conference in December 1958, in which he emphasised the need for tabligh. A large amount of his efforts were focused on the Khoja community.

== Islam in Western Kenya ==
Islam became established in western Kenya during the nineteenth century through contact between local communities and Muslim traders travelling from the East African coast and the interior trading networks connected with present-day Tanzania. A study conducted at the University of Nairobi by Ibrahim Juma Murua traces the early development of Islam in Mumias to the activities of Swahili Muslim traders who established relations with the Wanga community and the court of Nabongo Mumia, the ruler of the Wanga kingdom.

The study notes that the precise chronology of Islam's arrival in Mumias is uncertain, with different historical accounts giving different dates for the establishment of the first Muslim presence. Muslim traders subsequently established themselves in Mumias and introduced Islamic religious instruction alongside their commercial activities. Their interaction with the Wanga royal court contributed to the growth of Islam in the area, and Nabongo Mumia is reported to have converted to Islam.The development of Islam in Mumias was followed by the growth of Muslim communities and Islamic educational activities in the surrounding areas. According to study, the form of Islam that developed among the Wanga was influenced by the local social and cultural environment, with elements of Swahili Islamic practice becoming integrated with aspects of existing Wanga traditions. This process contributed to the emergence of an established African Muslim community in Mumias and its surrounding areas

Sharif Hassan Abdallah, described in the study as a Muslim trader from Pangani in present-day Tanzania, is identified with the early Muslim trading presence in Mumias. The establishment of relations between Muslim traders and Nabongo Mumia, the ruler of the Wanga kingdom, facilitated the settlement and commercial activity of other Swahili Muslims in the area. Muslim traders established places of worship and centres of Islamic instruction, including makeshift mosques and madrasas, which became important institutions for the transmission of Islamic knowledge and the formation of Muslim communities.

The conversion of Nabongo Mumia is regarded in local historical accounts as an important development in the history of Islam in the Wanga kingdom. Murua records that Sharif Hassan Abdallah and Nabongo Mumia developed close relations and that Mumia subsequently converted to Islam. According to this account, Mumia's conversion encouraged further interaction between the Wanga court and Muslim traders and contributed to the growth of an established Muslim community in Mumias. Accounts concerning the precise circumstances of Mumia's conversion vary, however, and the episode is primarily preserved through later historical and oral accounts rather than contemporary documentary records.

The growth of Islam in Mumias was accompanied by its expansion into neighbouring parts of western Kenya and the Lake Victoria region. Muslim traders and teachers established contacts with communities outside Mumias, while commercial routes facilitated the movement of people, religious ideas and Islamic institutions. The wider pattern is also evident in the history of Kendu-Bay, where Muslim traders reached the area through developing transport and commercial networks. A different study of Islam in Kendu Bay concludes that the expansion of Muslim trading activity into the interior contributed to the establishment of Muslim communities and that conversion subsequently occurred through sustained social contact, employment, marriage and interaction with Muslim communities.

Mumias consequently became one of the important centres from which Islam developed further in western Kenya. The expansion of Islam was not solely the result of formal missionary activity; trade, settlement, family relationships, education and the establishment of mosques and madrasas all contributed to the formation and consolidation of Muslim communities.

=== Muslim participation and Islamic institutions during the independence period ===
The political history of Muslims during Kenya's transition from colonial rule to independence has received comparatively less attention in general accounts of Kenyan nationalism than the activities of the principal nationalist political organisations. Nevertheless, Muslim interests were represented in the constitutional negotiations surrounding independence, particularly in relation to the legal position of Muslim personal law and the continuation of the Kadhi courts.

The Kadhis' Courts had a much longer history on the East African coast, where Islamic judicial institutions had existed before the establishment of British colonial rule. During the negotiations preceding Kenyan independence, their future status became connected with the constitutional arrangements governing the former ten-mile Coastal Strip. In October 1963, an agreement concerning the transfer of the Coastal Strip to Kenya included safeguards relating to freedom of worship and provided for the continuation of Kadhis' Courts with jurisdiction over specified matters of Muslim personal status, including marriage, divorce and inheritance.

The Kadhis' Courts were subsequently incorporated into the constitutional framework of independent Kenya. A journal on Muslim Minority Affairs notes that Kadhis' Courts applying Islamic personal law were entrenched in the Kenyan Constitution at independence in 1963. Their constitutional status subsequently became an important issue in Kenyan debates concerning religion, law and constitutional reform.

Muslim political participation became particularly visible during later constitutional-review processes. Journal documents the involvement of Muslim individuals and organisations in debates concerning the constitutional status of the Kadhis' Courts, including efforts to ensure that provisions protecting the courts would be retained in the proposed constitutional framework. These debates demonstrated the continuing importance of Islamic institutions within Muslim political mobilisation in Kenya after independence.

The constitutional position of the Kadhis' Courts was subsequently reaffirmed under the Constitution of Kenya adopted in 2010. Article 170 provides for a Chief Kadhi and other Kadhis and limits the jurisdiction of the Kadhis' Courts to questions of Muslim law concerning personal status, marriage, divorce and inheritance where all parties profess the Muslim religion and submit to the jurisdiction of the court.

The history of Islam in Kenya includes both the gradual expansion of Muslim communities through trade, settlement, education and social interaction and the development of formal Islamic institutions within the Kenyan state. In western Kenya, Mumias and the wider Lake Victoria region became important centres of Muslim settlement and religious education, while at the national level Muslim participation in constitutional debates contributed to the preservation and subsequent constitutional recognition of institutions such as the Kadhis' Courts.

=== Islamic revivalism and contemporary outreach ===
From the late twentieth century, developments in the wider Muslim world contributed to renewed interest in Islamic identity, religious observance and public engagement in a number of Muslim communities. John L. Esposito describes this broader development as an Islamic resurgence or revival, characterised by increased emphasis on religious identity and practice in both individual and collective life. He identified developments including greater participation in mosque activities, observance of Ramadan fasting, the expansion of Islamic literature and broadcasting, and the growth of Islamic associations as features of contemporary revivalism.

In Kenya, the increased visibility of Islamic religious practice has included the expansion and construction of mosques, the development of Islamic educational institutions, increased religious programming and publications, and greater public expression of Islamic values and identity. Islamic revivalism has also been associated with social and community activities extending beyond religious instruction. These have included the establishment or support of schools and health facilities, charitable activities, relief programmes and other forms of community assistance. Such activities have provided avenues through which Muslim organisations engage both Muslim communities and the wider Kenyan population.

Contemporary Islamic activism has also been influenced by intellectual and organisational movements that emerged in the Muslim world during the twentieth century. Among the organisations and thinkers frequently associated with modern Islamic revivalism are the Muslim Brotherhood, founded in Egypt by Hassan al-Banna, and the Jamaat-e-Islami, founded in British India by Abu al-A'la Mawdudi. Esposito describes these movements as part of a broader development in which Islamic organisations sought to address religious, social and political questions through renewed engagement with Islamic teachings and institutions. The ideas associated with these movements have subsequently been interpreted and adopted differently in various national and social contexts, and their influence should not be understood as uniform across Muslim communities.

Islamic revivalist activity in Kenya has included both programmes directed towards Muslims and forms of outreach to non-Muslims. A contemporary muslim journal identifies da'wah and mihadhara—public religious lectures or debates—as among the methods used in contemporary Islamic outreach in East Africa. Other forms of communication have included print publications, radio and other broadcasting, religious organisations and public educational activities. Social and humanitarian activities have likewise formed part of the work of some Muslim organisations, including educational provision, health-related initiatives and the distribution of relief and charitable assistance.

The increased public visibility of Islam has also intersected with debates concerning the position of Islamic institutions within the Kenyan state. One significant example has been the continuing discussion surrounding the Kadhis' Courts. The courts were incorporated into Kenya's constitutional arrangements at independence, and their jurisdiction was subsequently provided for under Article 170 of the Constitution of Kenya, 2010. The provision limits their jurisdiction to questions of Muslim law relating to personal status, marriage, divorce and inheritance where all parties profess the Muslim religion and submit to the jurisdiction of the court.

The development of contemporary Islamic outreach in Kenya encompasses religious education and observance, institutional development, social welfare activities, public religious discourse and engagement with questions concerning the place of Islamic institutions in Kenyan society. These developments form part of wider patterns of Islamic revivalism that have occurred across different regions of the Muslim world, while taking distinctive forms within Kenya's particular historical, social and constitutional context.

== Shia Islam ==
The Shia Muslim population in Kenya comprises communities with different historical and geographical origins, including South Asian-origin Khoja Shia Ithna-Asheri and Ismaili communities, Dawoodi Bohra Muslims, and Kenyan converts and other indigenous Kenyan Shia Muslims. The historical development of the Khoja Shia Ithna-Asheri community is particularly associated with the Indian Ocean trading networks linking India, Zanzibar, Lamu and Mombasa. Historical accounts record the establishment of Khoja Shia Ithna-Asheri commercial and religious communities in Lamu and Mombasa during the late nineteenth century, followed by migration to Nairobi and other parts of Kenya.

The communities subsequently established mosques, imambaras, educational institutions and charitable organisations, contributing to the institutional development of Shia Islam in Kenya. Among prominent Kenyan Shia religious figures was Shaykh Abdillahi Nassir, a Mombasa-born Islamic scholar who was raised in the Sunni tradition and subsequently became a Twelver Shia scholar and prominent figure in Shia religious life in East Africa. The history of Shia Islam in Kenya reflects both the migration of established South Asian Shia communities through Indian Ocean commercial networks and the subsequent development of locally rooted Shia religious institutions and leadership.

== Notable Muslims ==
- Habib Salih – scholar
- Khwaja Muhammad Latif Ansari – scholar
- Dekha Ibrahim Abdi – activist
- Yusuf Hassan Abdi – politician, diplomat, social activist, journalist
- Mubarak Muyika- businessman, Multi-time Forbes under 30 honoree
- Najib Balala – politician
- Mohamed Yusuf Haji – politician
- Ali Korane – politician
- Abdul Majid Cockar – lawyer, also served as Chief Justice of Kenya
- Asif Karim – cricketer
- Ragheb Aga – cricketer
- Irfan Karim – cricketer
- Barack Obama, Sr. - father of Barack Obama, the 44th president of the United States (converted to Islam from Christianity, but later became an Atheist).
- Omar Ahmed – boxer
- Shehzana Anwar – archer
- Sauda Rajab – businesswoman
- Rama Salim – footballer
- Awadh Saleh Sherman – businessman
- Amina Mohamed – politician
- Muhammad Mumia -Leader of Wanga Kingdom, and official in colonial Kenya

== See also ==
- Religion in Kenya
